= List of ecclesiastical works by Austin and Paley (1916–1944) =

Austin and Paley was the title of a practice of architects in Lancaster, Lancashire, England, in the first half of the 20th century. The practice was founded in 1836 by Edmund Sharpe. Between 1895 and 1914 the partners had been Hubert Austin and Henry Paley. Henry Paley had joined the practice as a partner in 1886 when his father, E. G. Paley, was Austin's partner; the practice then became known as Paley, Austin and Paley. E. G. Paley died in 1895 and the practice continued under the title of Austin and Paley. Austin's son, Geoffrey, joined the practice as a partner in 1914 and for a short time the practice was known as Austin, Paley and Austin. Hubert Austin died in 1915. Geoffrey Austin was on active service during the First World War and did not return to the practice, so Henry Paley continued the business of the firm as the sole partner from this time. For a time the practice continued with the title of Austin, Paley and Austin but around 1925 it reverted to the title of Austin and Paley. Henry Paley retired in 1936 but some work continued to be done by the practice until at least 1942; it was finally wound up around 1944.

This list covers the ecclesiastical works executed by the practice after 1916. These works include new churches, restorations and alterations of older churches, additions to churches, and church fittings and furniture. The practice designed about 10 new churches and restored or modified many more. Because of the location of the practice, most of their ecclesiastical work was in the areas that are now Cumbria, Lancashire, and Greater Manchester, but examples can also be found in Cheshire, North Yorkshire, Staffordshire, Nottinghamshire, and the West Midlands.

== Key ==
| Grade | Criteria |
|---|---|
| Grade I | Buildings of exceptional interest, sometimes considered to be internationally important. |
| Grade II* | Particularly important buildings of more than special interest. |
| Grade II | Buildings of national importance and special interest. |
"—" denotes a work that is not graded.

== Works ==
| Name | Location | Photograph | Date | Notes | Grade |
|---|---|---|---|---|---|
| St Matthew's Church | Highfield, Wigan, Greater Manchester; 53.5292°N 2.6725°W | — | 1917 | Addition of a stone reredos in memory of Colonel Blundell. | II* |
| Christ Church | Lancaster, Lancashire; 54.0458°N 2.7883°W | | 1919 | War memorial in the churchyard, consisting of a cross in Derbyshire stone, 25 feet (8 m) high, costing £400. | II |
| St Anne's Church | St Annes, Lancashire; 53.7565°N 3.0226°W | | 1919 | A baptistry was added in 1919, general repairs were carried out in 1929–31, and a memorial clergy vestry was built in 1930–31. | II |
| All Saints Church | Wigan, Greater Manchester; 53.5460°N 2.6328°W | | 1922 | The lower part of the tower was refaced with Parbold stone. | II* |
| St Mary's Church | Ulverston, Cumbria; 54.1989°N 3.0915°W | | 1923 | Converted the south chancel aisle into a war memorial. | II* |
| St Michael's Church | Pennington, Cumbria; 54.1873°N 3.1312°W | | 1924–26 | Addition of a chancel and a porch; restoration of the tower. | II |
| St Mary's Church | Acton, Cheshire; 53.0737°N 2.5512°W | | 1925 | Repairs to the tower. | I |
| Holy Trinity Church | Skipton, North Yorkshire; 53.9633°N 2.0161°W | | 1925 | A new roof to the north transept and other repairs. | I |
| St Bertoline's Church | Barthomley, Cheshire; 53.0682°N 2.3483°W | | 1925–26 | Restoration and a new chancel added. | I |
| All Saints' Church | Becconsall, Lancashire; 53.7027°N 2.8400°W | | 1925–26 | New church. The tower was completed in 1935. | — |
| St John the Baptist's Church | Earlestown, Merseyside; 53.4536°N 2.6447°W | | 1925–26 | Addition of half a bay to the nave, and a tower base. | — |
| Church of St Stephen on-the-Cliffs | Blackpool, Lancashire; 53.8407°N 3.0514°W | — | 1925–27 | A new church with a brick exterior and a sandstone interior. It was never completed. | — |
| St John the Baptist's Church | Blawith, Cumbria; 54.2857°N 3.0940°W | | 1926 | Renovation of the northwest wall and buttresses. | — |
| Gatehouse | St Wilfrid's Church, Standish, Greater Manchester; 53.586840°N 2.661494°W | | 1926 | An elaborate gatehouse built as a memorial to the First World War. | II |
| St Hilda's Church | Bilsborrow, Lancashire; 53.8522°N 2.7421°W | | 1926–28 | New church. | — |
| St Luke's Church | Orrell, Greater Manchester; 53.5290°N 2.7100°W | | 1927–28 | New church; completed in 1936–39. | — |
| Christ Church | Wesham, Lancashire; 53.7902°N 2.8855°W | | 1927–28 | Completed the east end of the church, added a porch, and reseated the church. | II |
| St Mark's Church | Basford, Staffordshire; 53.0176°N 2.2098°W | — | 1928–29 | Vestries added. | — |
| St Stephen's Church | Whelley, Wigan, Greater Manchester; 53.5554°N 2.6161°W | — | 1928–30 | New church, completed by the firm in 1937–38. | II |
| Lancaster Cathedral | Lancaster, Lancashire; 54.0470°N 2.7939°W | | 1928–1944 | Repairs. | II* |
| St Oswald's Church | Winwick, Cheshire; 53.4308°N 2.5979°W | | 1929 | Restoration of the Gerrard Chapel in 1929 and the tower in 1931. | I |
| St Thomas' Church | Ashton-in-Makerfield, Greater Manchester; 53.4857°N 2.6389°W | | 1929–30 | Vestry added. | II |
| St Michael and All Angels' Church | Middleton, Greater Manchester; 53.5477°N 2.1906°W | | 1929–30 | Tower added. | II |
| St Mary's Church | Sandbach, Cheshire; 53.1436°N 2.3610°W | | 1929–30 | Addition of a new vestry and porch. | II* |
| St Matthew's Church | Burnley, Lancashire; 53.7837°N 2.2546°W | | 1929–31 | Church rebuilt after a fire. | — |
| Church of St John the Divine | Preston, Lancashire; 53.7585°N 2.6961°W | | 1930 | General repairs, including new ceilings to the nave, chancel and chapel. In 1932 supervised repairs to the tower and spire. | II* |
| St Mary the Virgin's Church | Walney Island, Cumbria; 54.1067°N 3.2474°W | | 1930–31 | Added aisles and a vestry, and completed the west end of a church built by the same practice in 1907–08. | II |
| St Barbara's Church | Earlsdon, Coventry, West Midlands; 52.3971°N 1.5389°W | | 1930–31 | New church. | — |
| St Thomas' Church | Blackpool, Lancashire; 53.8215°N 3.0396°W | — | 1930–32 | New church. | — |
| St John the Evangelist's Church | Crawshawbooth, Rawtenstall, Lancashire; 53.7226°N 2.2892°W | | 1931 | Addition of Memorial Chapel. | II* |
| All Saints' Church | Long Whatton, Leicestershire; 52.8053°N 1.2860°W | | 1931 | Added a baptistry. | II* |
| St Cuthbert's Church | Lytham St Annes, Lancashire; 53.7374°N 2.9762°W | | 1931 | Addition of a chapel. | II* |
| St Anne's Church | Worksop, Nottinghamshire; 53.3028°N 1.1329°W | | 1931 | A memorial to Sir John Robinson, the founder of the church. | II |
| St Thomas' Church | Halliwell, Bolton, Greater Manchester; 53.5926°N 2.4427°W | | 1931–32 | New vestry. | II* |
| Immanuel Church | Feniscowles, Blackburn, Lancashire; 53.7268°N 2.5408°W | | 1931–32 | Restoration. | II |
| Christ Church | Glasson, Lancashire; 53.9965°N 2.8426°W | | 1931–32 | Addition of a chancel and vestry. | II |
| St Nicholas' Church | Wrea Green, Lancashire; 53.7771°N 2.9155°W | | 1931–32 | New choir floor and seats. | II |
| St Peter's Church | Newton-le-Willows, Merseyside; 53.4560°N 2.6144°W | | 1932 | Addition of vestries, a porch and offices. | II |
| St Paul's Church | Scotforth, Lancaster, Lancashire; 54.0336°N 2.7955°W | | 1932 | Redecoration and a new doorway. | II |
| St Paul's Church | Grange-over-Sands, Cumbria; 54.1933°N 2.9098°W | | 1932–33 | New chancel and other additions. | II |
| St Barnabas' Church | Coventry, West Midlands; 52.4232°N 1.4931°W | — | 1932–33 | A new church, plain, and never completed. | — |
| St Matthew's Church | Preston, Lancashire; 53.7636°N 2.6759°W | — | 1932–33 | Added a chapel and vestries and completed the chancel. | — |
| St Christopher's Church | Bare, Morecambe, Lancashire; 54.0774°N 2.8453°W | — | 1932–34 | New church. | — |
| St Michael and All Angels' Church | Ashton-on-Ribble, Preston, Lancashire; 53.7651°N 2.7317°W | — | 1934 | Work on the organ floor and walls. | II* |
| St John the Evangelist's Church | Abram, Greater Manchester; 53.5096°N 2.5937°W | | 1935–37 | New church, replacing an earlier church damaged by subsidence. The last new church to be designed by the firm. | — |
| St Thomas' Church | Eaton, Cheshire; 53.1657°N 2.6398°W | | 1936 | Refitting, including a new marble floor to the sanctuary, reredos, pulpit, stalls, chancel screen, and the creation of an organ chamber. | — |
| St Mary Magdalene's Church | Alsager, Cheshire; 53.0961°N 2.3071°W | — | 1936–37 | North porch and aisles completed. | II |
| Christ Church | Fulwood, Preston, Lancashire; 53.7772°N 2.7032°W | | 1937 | Added the Chapel of Remembrance. | — |
| St John the Baptist's Church | Atherton, Greater Manchester; 53.5239°N 2.4902°W | | 1938 | Vestry added. | II |
| St Anne's Church | Singleton, Lancashire; 53.8379°N 2.9360°W | | 1938–39 | Addition of a vestry. | II |
| St Mary Magdalen's Church | Ribbleton, Preston, Lancashire; 53.7765°N 2.6603°W | | 1938–41 | Addition of a new chancel, chapel, aisles and vestries. | — |
| St Margaret's Church | Halliwell, Bolton, Greater Manchester; 53.5844°N 2.4569°W | — | 1939 | Vestry and offices added. | — |
| St James' Church | Westhead, Ormskirk, Lancashire; 53.5583°N 2.8524°W | | 1939 | New vestries added. | II |

== See also ==
- Lists of works by Sharpe, Paley and Austin
