= List of ecclesiastical works by Austin and Paley (1895–1916) =

Austin and Paley was the title of a practice of architects in Lancaster, Lancashire, England, in the late 19th and early 20th centuries. The practice had been founded in 1836 by Edmund Sharpe. The architects during the period covered by this list are Hubert Austin and Henry Paley. Henry Paley had joined the practice as a partner in 1886 when his father, E. G. Paley, was Austin's partner; the practice then became known as Paley, Austin and Paley. E. G. Paley died in 1895 and the practice continued under the title of Austin and Paley. Austin's son joined the practice as a partner in 1914.

This list covers the ecclesiastical works executed by the practice during the partnership of Hubert Austin and Henry Paley between 1895 and 1914. These works include new churches, restorations and alterations of older churches, additions to churches, and church fittings and furniture. The practice designed about 28 new churches and restored or modified many more. Because of the location of the practice, most of their ecclesiastical work was in the areas that are now Cumbria, Lancashire, and Greater Manchester, but examples can also be found in Cheshire, Merseyside, North Yorkshire, Staffordshire, County Durham, Nottinghamshire, and Hertfordshire.

== Key ==
Grade	Criteria
Grade I	Buildings of exceptional interest, sometimes considered to be internationally important.
Grade II*	Particularly important buildings of more than special interest.
Grade II	Buildings of national importance and special interest.
"—" denotes a work that is not graded.

== Works ==
Name	Location	Photograph	Date	Notes	Grade
St Lawrence's Church	Over Peover, Cheshire; 53.2582°N 2.3431°W		1895	Church refurbished.	I
St Mary's Church	Staveley-in-Cartmel, Cumbria; 54.2653°N 2.9543°W		1895–97	Restoration including removal of pews, reroofing and reseating the church, and replacing the stone arcade with one in timber.	II
St Peter's Church	Field Broughton, Cumbria; 54.2278852°N 2.9419223°W		1892–94	Replacement of original 1745 Chapel of Ease for Cartmel Priory. Present building in good repair, fairly original condition. Toilet in vestry added 2010. Spire shingles renewed at least twice, lastly in ~ 1998. Original Foster and Andrews organ still in use.	II*
St George's Church	Altrincham, Greater Manchester; 53.3900°N 2.3511°W		1896–97	Work on the nave and aisles.	II
Holy Trinity Church	Casterton, Cumbria; 54.2115°N 2.5771°W		1897	New reredos.	II
St Mary's Church	Mellor, Lancashire; 53.7729°N 2.5307°W		1897	Renovation, including work on monuments and a new font.	II
Holy Trinity Church	Morecambe, Lancashire; 54.0746°N 2.8575°W	—	1897	Chancel replaced, organ chamber and vestries added.	II
Sedbergh School Chapel	Sedbergh, Cumbria; 54.3216°N 2.5307°W		1897	New chapel for the school.	II*
St Mary's Church	Acton, Cheshire; 53.0737°N 2.5512°W		1897–98	Restoration, including reflooring and reroofing the church, removing the plaster ceilings, rebuilding the north wall of the north aisle and the clerestory, installing heating apparatus, and adding a new pulpit, porches, and doors.	I
St Mark's Church	Dolphinholme, Lancashire; 53.9739°N 2.7377°W		1897–98	New church with a tower at the crossing.	II
St Ambrose's Church	Grindleton, Clitheroe, Lancashire; 53.9063°N 2.3632°W		1897–98	Rebuilt the church, other than the tower and the south side.	II
St Chad's Church	Over, Cheshire		1897–98	Added vestries and an organ chamber in 1897–98; in about 1906 installed heating and increased the seating.	II*
St John the Baptist's Church	Flookburgh, Cumbria; 54.1760°N 2.9737°W		1897–1900	New church in Romanesque style.	II*
St Andrew's Church	Burnley, Lancashire; 53.8021°N 2.2352°W		1898	Restoration of a church by J. Medland Taylor built in 1866–67.	II
St Paul's Church	Bury, Greater Manchester; 53.5960°N 2.2829°W		1898	Alterations to the interior. It has since been made redundant and has been converted for residential use.	II
St George's Mission Church	Lancaster, Lancashire	—	1898	New church.	—
St John the Baptist's Church	Bretherton, Chorley, Lancashire; 53.6777°N 2.7951°W		1898	The church was restored in 1898 and in 1908–09 a chancel and vestry were added.	II
St Anne's Church	Hindsford, Atherton, Greater Manchester; 53.5188°N 2.4812°W		1898–1901	New church in Decorated style. Converted into flats in 2003–04.	II
St Helen's Church	Waddington, Lancashire; 53.8899°N 2.4144°W		1898–1901	Church rebuilt other than the tower.	II*
St Barnabas' Church	Morecambe, Lancashire; 54.0646°N 2.8781°W	—	1898–1901	New church in Perpendicular style.	—
St John the Baptist's Church	Arkholme, Lancashire; 54.1406°N 2.6305°W		1899	Restoration.	II*
St Oswald's Church	Preesall, Lancashire; 53.9271°N 2.9771°W		1899	New church.	II
St Thomas' Church	St Annes, Lancashire; 53.7474°N 3.0245°W		1899–1900	New church, completed in 1904–05.	II
St Anne's Church	Woodplumpton, Lancashire; 53.8039°N 2.7617°W		1899–1900	Additions and restoration.	II*
St John's Church	Morecambe, Lancashire; 54.0580°N 2.8876°W	—	1899–1901	New church.	II
St Alban's Church	Broadheath, Greater Manchester; 53.4024°N 2.3520°W	—	1900	New church.	II
St Mary Magdalene's Church	Broughton-in-Furness, Cumbria; 54.2760°N 3.2157°W		1900	Addition of a southwest tower.	II
St Luke's Church	Slyne-with-Hest, Lancashire; 54.0877°N 2.8055°W		1900	New church.	II
All Saints' Church	Balterley, Staffordshire; 53.0502°N 2.3577°W		1901	New church.	II
St Mary Magdalen's Church	Ribbleton, Preston, Lancashire; 53.7765°N 2.6603°W		c. 1901	Additions.	—
St Margaret's Church	High Bentham, North Yorkshire; 54.1146°N 2.5082°W		1901–02	Additions.	II
St Michael's Church	Middleton, Greater Manchester; 53.5477°N 2.1906°W		1901–02	New church, completed in 1911, with the tower added in 1926–31.	II
St Mary's Church	Whicham, Millom, Cumbria; 54.2326°N 3.3287°W		1901–02	Restoration.	II
St Paul's Church	Constable Lee, Rawtenstall, Lancashire; 53.7102°N 2.2886°W	—	1901–03	New church.	II
St Andrew's Church	Kildwick, North Yorkshire; 53.9091°N 1.9840°W		1901–03	Chancel and nave restored.	I
St Helen's Church	Overton, Lancashire; 54.0113°N 2.8545°W		1902	Restoration.	II*
Lancaster Priory	Lancaster, Lancashire; 54.0507°N 2.8057°W		1902–12	In 1902 the southwest porch and the Hatch Memorial were added, followed in 1903–04 by a chapel on the north side. A restoration, including the nave roof and the chancel floor, was carried out in 1911–12.	I
St Mary's Church	Ulverston, Cumbria; 54.1989°N 3.0915°W		1903–04	Extended the chancel, added fittings, and built a south porch.	II*
St John the Evangelist's Church	Worsthorne, Lancashire; 53.7878°N 2.1892°W		1903–04	Added a new west tower, removed old vestries, and extended the seating.	II
St Paul's Church	Skelmersdale, Lancashire; 53.5500°N 2.7924°W		1903–06	New church in Perpendicular style.	II
St Chad's Church	Claughton, Lancashire; 54.0931°N 2.6641°W		1904	Restoration. The church has been redundant since 2005.	II
St Cuthbert's Church	Redmarshall, County Durham; 54.5844°N 1.4040°W		1904	Restoration.	I
All Saints' Church	Hertford, Hertfordshire; 51.7950°N 0.0757°W		1904–05	The west end of the church was completed and the tower was added.	II*
All Saints' Church	Barnacre, Lancashire; 53.9079°N 2.7431°W		1905	New church.	II
Holy Trinity Church	Brathay, Cumbria; 54.4211°N 2.9844°W		1905	Additions made to the church.	II
St John the Baptist's Church	Broughton, Lancashire; 53.8035°N 2.7167°W		1905–06	Chancel, vestries and an organ chamber added.	II*
St Michael and All Angels' Church	Ashton-on-Ribble, Preston, Lancashire; 53.7651°N 2.7317°W	—	1905–08	New church in Perpendicular style. It was completed in 1915.	II*
St Leonard's Church	Balderstone, Lancashire; 53.7855°N 2.5604°W		1906–07	Added a tower and a spire.	II
St John's Church	Ellel, Lancashire; 53.9961°N 2.7855°W		1906–07	New church.	II
St John the Baptist's Church	Tunstall, Lancashire; 54.1597°N 2.5923°W		1907	Restoration.	I
St Mary the Virgin's Church	Walney Island, Cumbria; 54.1067°N 3.2474°W		1907–08	New church to replace a church of 1853 by Sharpe and Paley.	II
St Mary's Church	Widnes, Cheshire; 53.3488°N 2.7329°W		1908–10	New church in Perpendicular style.	II*
St Cuthbert's Church	Over Kellet, Lancashire; 54.1195°N 2.7319°W		1909	Restoration.	II*
Holy Trinity Church	Skipton, North Yorkshire; 53.9633°N 2.0161°W		1909	Restoration, including removal of galleries, addition of new vestries, seating, and a bell ringers' loft.	I
St John's Church	Birkdale, Southport, Merseyside; 53.6228°N 3.0138°W		1909–10	Addition of a north aisle and arcade, and vestries.	II
St Matthew's Church	Highfield, Wigan, Greater Manchester; 53.5292°N 2.6725°W	—	1909–10	Extension of the nave and south aisle to the west.	II*
St Mary's Church	Leigh, Greater Manchester; 53.4983°N 2.5198°W		1909–10	Addition of a new vestry and refacing the tower.	II*
St Mark's Church	Natland, Cumbria; 54.2961°N 2.7374°W		1909–10	New church in Perpendicular style.	II*
St Wilfrid's Church	Newton Heath, Greater Manchester; 53.5059°N 2.1712°W		1909–10	New church; now redundant.	II
St Andrew's Church	Starbeck, Harrogate, North Yorkshire; 54.0006°N 1.4964°W		1909–10	New church.	II
St Michael's Church	Cockerham, Lancashire; 53.9601°N 2.8206°W		1910	Replaced the body of the church in Perpendicular style, retaining the original Perpendicular tower.	II*
St George's Church	Kendal, Cumbria; 54.3298°N 2.7401°W		1910–14	New chancel, organ loft and vestries added.	—
St John's Church	Great Harwood, Lancashire; 53.7827°N 2.4066°W		1911–12	New church. Demolished 2010.	—
St Margaret's Church	Thornbury, Bradford, West Yorkshire; 53.8611°N 1.6910°W	—	1911–12	New church costing £8,264. In the 1980s cracks appeared in the chancel arch, and the building was declared unsafe. It was demolished in 1991, and has been replaced by the Thornbury Centre, which houses the new Church of St Margaret.	—
St Anne's Church	Worksop, Nottinghamshire; 53.3028°N 1.1329°W		1911–12	New church in Perpendicular style.	II
St Margaret's Church	Halliwell, Bolton, Greater Manchester; 53.5844°N 2.4569°W	—	1911–13	New church.	—
St Thomas' Church	Lydiate, Merseyside; 53.5443°N 2.9624°W		1912	Added a chancel, chapel, and vestry to a church built in 1839–41.	II
St Thomas' Church	Milnthorpe, Cumbria; 54.2268°N 2.7702°W		1912	Alterations at the west end of the church, originally built in 1835–37.	—
St James' Church	Arnside, Cumbria; 54.2018°N 2.8317°W		1912–14	Addition of a south aisle.	—
St Peter's Church	Leck, Lancashire; 54.1838°N 2.5484°W		1913 (or 1915)	Church rebuilt after a fire.	II
St Saviour's Church	Aughton, Lancashire; 54.1025°N 2.6892°W		1913–14	Added a parclose screen.	—
St Silas' Church	Blackburn, Lancashire; 53.7516°N 2.5074°W		1913–14	The previously planned tower was added, plus a porch, at a cosy of over £6,000, but the intended steeple was never built.	II*
St Wilfrid's Church	Standish, Greater Manchester; 53.5872°N 2.6614°W		1913–14	Additions, including east vestries.	I
Christ Church	Thornton, Lancashire; 53.8774°N 3.0218°W	—	1913–14	Chancel added.	—
St James' Church	Waterloo, Pudsey, West Yorkshire	—	1914	New church, replacing a smaller mission church. It was itself replaced by a new church, St James The Great, Woodhall, on a site nearby in 1959.	—
St George's Church	Hertford, Hertfordshire	—	1914	Reredos.	—
St John the Baptist's Church	Blawith, Cumbria; 54.2857°N 3.0940°W		1914	Restoration. It is now redundant and under the care of the Churches Conservation Trust.	—
St Mark's Church	Basford, Staffordshire; 53.0176°N 2.2098°W	—	1914–15	New church.	—

== See also ==
- Lists of works by Sharpe, Paley and Austin
