= St Christopher's Church, Bare =

Church in Morecambe, Lancashire, England

Coordinates: 54.0774°N 2.8453°W

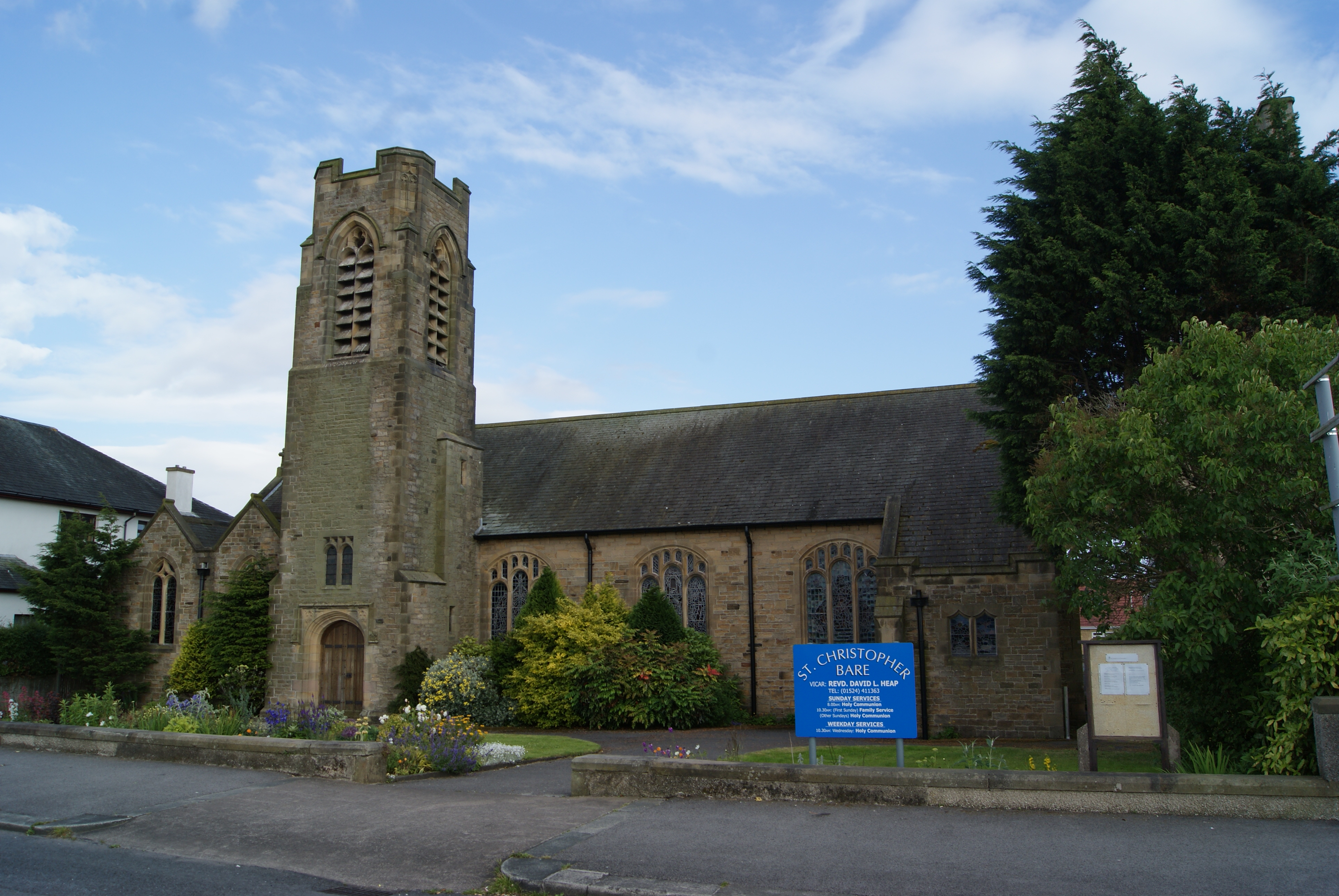
St Christopher's Church, Bare

St Christopher's Church is in Marine Road East, Bare, Morecambe, Lancashire, England. It is an active Anglican parish church in the deanery of Lancaster and Morecambe, the archdeaconry of Lancaster, and the diocese of Blackburn. The church was built in 1933 to a design by Henry Paley of the Lancaster practice of Austin and Paley at a cost of £5,957 (equivalent to £160,000 in 2025). Its architectural style is Free Perpendicular. The architectural historian Nikolaus Pevsner commented that it is "pleasant to look at, but very conservative for its age". Its plan consists of a nave, north aisle, chancel, and northeast tower. A planned south aisle was never built. Most of the windows are in the style of the 16th century; those in the aisle are transomed. The stained glass includes the east window and the window at the east end of the chapel by Shrigley and Hunt dating from the 1930s. There is more 20th-century glass elsewhere in the church made by Abbott and Company of Lancaster. The two-manual pipe organ is the result of a rebuild in 1984 of an older organ by George Sixsmith.

== See also ==
- List of ecclesiastical works by Austin and Paley (1916–44)
