= St Anne's Church, Worksop =

Coordinates: 53°18′11″N 01°07′58″W

St. Anne's Church, Worksop
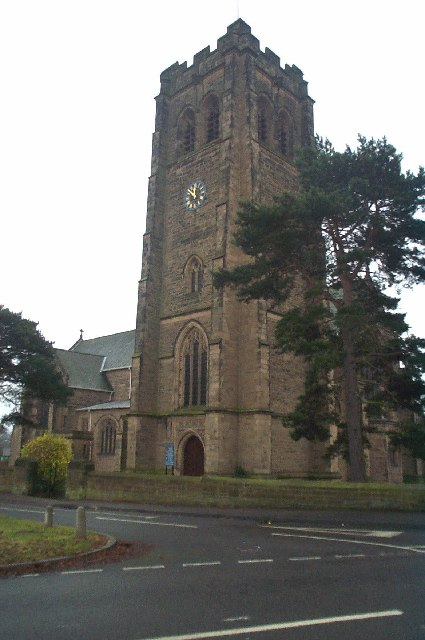
- St. Anne's Church, Worksop
- Denomination: Church of England
- Churchmanship: Broad Church
- Website: http://www.stanneschurch.co.uk

History
- Dedication: St. Anne

Administration
- Province: York
- Diocese: Southwell and Nottingham
- Parish: Worksop

Clergy
- Vicar: Revd David Gough

St. Anne's Church, Worksop is an Anglican parish church in Worksop, Nottinghamshire, England. It is recorded in the National Heritage List for England as a designated Grade II listed building.

== History ==
The church was built in 1911 by the Lancaster architects Austin and Paley.

It is located on Newcastle Avenue. It is built in the 15th-century Perpendicular style.

== Memorials ==
The church contains the medieval-style alabaster canopied tomb of Sir John Robinson, the builder of the church. The monument comprises a recumbent effigy in Carrara marble by Albert Toft. This was designed by Henry Paley of the Lancaster architectural practice; its estimated cost was £2,055.

== Organ ==
The church has an historic pipe organ which originated in an organ by Gray & Davison in 1852 for Clapham Congregational Church. This was later installed in St. John's Church, Buckley in Flintshire, and then moved to St. Anne's Church, by Goetze and Gwynn in 1999. A specification and pictures of the pipe organ can be found on the National Pipe Organ Register.

== Bells ==
The church has ten bells.

== See also ==
- List of ecclesiastical works by Austin and Paley (1895–1914)
- List of ecclesiastical works by Austin and Paley (1916–44)
- Listed buildings in Worksop
