= St Matthew's Church, Preston =

Church in Lancashire, England

Coordinates: 53.7636°N 2.6759°W

St Matthew's Church, is in New Hall Lane, Preston, Lancashire, England. It is an active Anglican parish church in the deanery of Preston, the archdeaconry of Lancaster, and the diocese of Blackburn. The church was built in 1881–83 to a design by James Hibbert. In 1932–33 Henry Paley of the Lancaster practice of Austin and Paley added a chapel and vestries and completed the chancel at a cost of £2,637 (equivalent to £240,000 in 2023). The plan of the church consists of a nave, north and south aisles, a chancel with a canted apse, and a porch treated as a transept. Hartwell and Pevsner in the Buildings of England series comment that it is "an interesting building by the architect of the Harris Museum.

== See also ==
- List of ecclesiastical works by Austin and Paley (1916–44)
