= St Barbara's Church, Earlsdon =

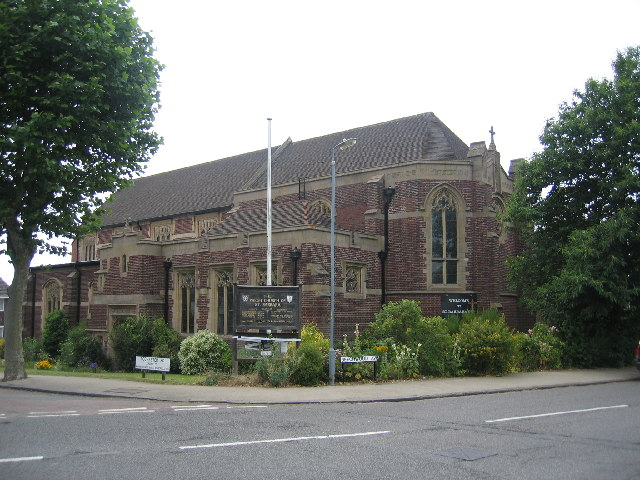
- St Barbara's Church, Earlsdon
- 52.3971°N 1.5389°W
- OS grid reference: SP 31471 77773
- Country: England
- Denomination: Anglican
- Website: https://stbarbaras.com/

History
- Status: Active
- Founder: Sir Alfred Herbert
- Consecrated: 26 Sep 1931

Architecture
- Architect: Henry Paley
- Years built: 1930-1931
- Construction cost: £17,644

Administration
- Diocese: Coventry
- Archdeaconry: Coventry
- Deanery: Coventry, South
- Parish: St Barbara's, Earlsdon

St Barbara's Church is in Earlsdon, a suburb of Coventry, West Midlands, England. It is an active Anglican parish church in the deanery of Coventry, South, the archdeaconry of Coventry, and the diocese of Coventry. The church was built in 1930–31 to replace a smaller church nearby. It was designed by Henry Paley of the Lancaster architects Austin and Paley, with a local man, Herbert Jackson, acting as clerk of works and consulting architect.

The foundation stone was laid on 28 September 1930 by Sir Alfred Herbert, a local industrialist, and the church was consecrated on 26 September 1931. Due to a lack of finance, the church was never completed, the missing parts being the western 2½ bays, two porches, a baptistry and a bell turret. The total cost of the church was £17,644 (equivalent to £1,040,000 in 2025), of which £975 was donated by Sir Alfred to build the Lady Chapel as a memorial to his late second wife Florence (m. 1913, d. 1930), widow of Lieutenant-Colonel H. E. E. Lucas.

== See also ==
- List of ecclesiastical works by Austin and Paley (1916–44)
