= St Luke's Church, Orrell =

Coordinates: 53.5290°N 2.7100°W

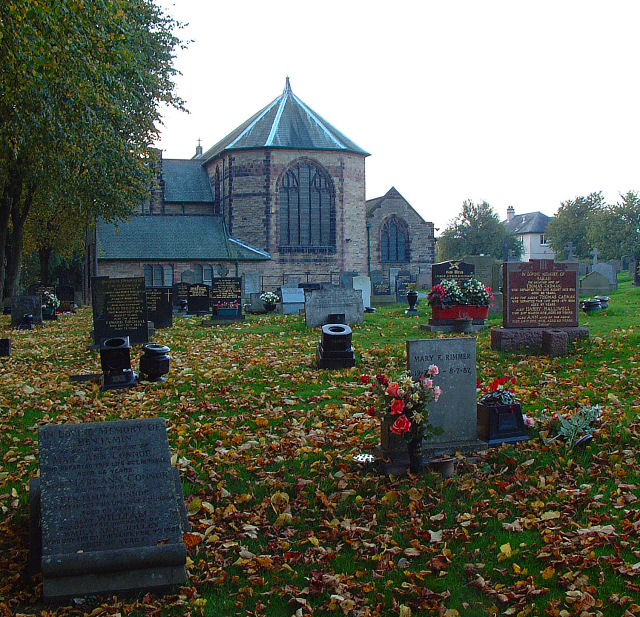
- East end of St Luke's Church, Orrell

- Location in Greater Manchester
- OS grid reference: SD 53032 03826
- Location: Lodge Road, Orrell, Wigan, Greater Manchester
- Country: England
- Denomination: Anglican
- Website: St Luke, Orrell

History
- Status: Parish church
- Dedication: Saint Luke

Architecture
- Functional status: Active
- Architect: Henry Paley
- Architectural type: Church
- Style: Gothic Revival
- Groundbreaking: 1926
- Completed: 1938

Administration
- Province: York
- Diocese: Liverpool
- Archdeaconry: Warrington
- Deanery: Wigan
- Parish: St Luke, Orrell

St Luke's Church is in Lodge Road, Orrell, Wigan, Greater Manchester, England. It is an active Anglican parish church in the deanery of Wigan, the archdeaconry of Warrington, and the diocese of Liverpool.

== History ==
The three west bays of St Luke's were built in 1926–27, but the remainder was not completed until 1939. It had been planned to have a southwest tower, but this was never built. The church was designed by Henry Paley of the Lancaster firm of architects Austin and Paley.

== Architecture ==
The church is designed mainly in Perpendicular style, and has a polygonal apse at the east end. Inside the church, the arcades are carried on octagonal piers. Under the chancel arch is a low wall with an integral pulpit. The sedilia and furnishings were designed by the architects, and include an octagonal font.

== External features ==
The churchyard contains the war graves of a soldier and three airmen of World War II.

== See also ==
- List of ecclesiastical works by Austin and Paley (1916–44)
- List of churches in Greater Manchester
