= St Mark's Church, Basford =

Coordinates: 53.0176°N 2.2098°W

St Mark's Church
- Front entrance to the church
- St Mark's Church
- OS grid reference: SJ 86022 46718
- Location: Basford, Newcastle-under-Lyme
- Country: England

Architecture
- Groundbreaking: Foundation stone laid in 1914
- Completed: 1915

Administration
- Diocese: Lichfield

St Mark's Church is in Basford, Staffordshire, England. It is an active Anglican parish church, in the deanery of Newcastle-under-Lyme, the archdeaconry of Stoke-on-Trent, and the diocese of Lichfield.

== History ==
St Mark's was built in 1914–15, and designed by the Lancaster architects Austin and Paley. At that time only the east end and three bays of the nave and aisles were completed; the west wall was intended to be temporary. In 1928–29 the same practice added new vestries at a cost of £1,450. The west wall was rebuilt, and the rest of the church was completed in 1971, by Charles R. Lewis.

== See also ==
- List of ecclesiastical works by Austin and Paley (1895–1916)
- List of ecclesiastical works by Austin and Paley (1916–44)
