= St Stephen's Church, Whelley =

Coordinates: 53.5554°N 2.6161°W

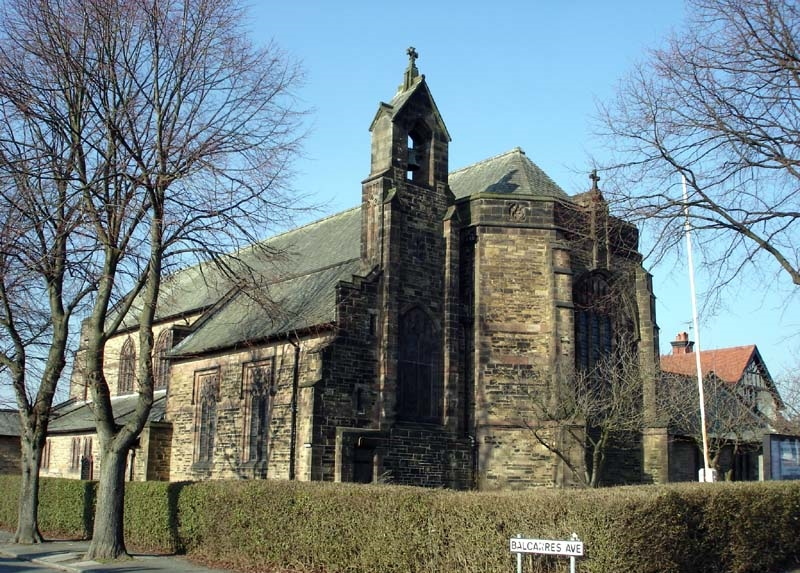

- Location in Greater Manchester
- OS grid reference: SD 593,067
- Location: Balcarres Avenue, Whelley, Wigan, Greater Manchester
- Country: England
- Denomination: Anglican
- Website: St Stephen, Whelley

History
- Status: Parish church

Architecture
- Functional status: Active
- Heritage designation: Grade II
- Designated: 11 July 1983
- Architect: Henry Paley
- Architectural type: Church
- Style: Gothic Revival
- Groundbreaking: 1928
- Completed: 1938

Specifications
- Materials: Stone

Administration
- Province: York
- Diocese: Liverpool
- Archdeaconry: Warrington
- Deanery: Wigan
- Parish: St Stephen, Wigan

Clergy
- Vicar: Rev Bill Matthews

St Stephen's Church is in Balcarres Avenue, Whelley, Wigan, Greater Manchester, England. It is an active Anglican parish church in the deanery of Wigan, the archdeaconry of Wigan and West Lancashire, and the diocese of Liverpool. Its benefice is united with that of St John, New Springs. The church is recorded in the National Heritage List for England as a designated Grade II listed building.

== History ==
The first phase of the church was built between 1928 and 1930, the foundation stone being laid in November 1928, and the church being consecrated on 9 April 1930. It was designed by the Lancaster architect Henry Paley of Austin and Paley, and the church was built on land given by Lord Crawford. The first phase consisted of the east end of the church, and the first two bays of the nave and the aisles: this cost £9,863 (equivalent to £560,000 in 2025). The church was completed in 1937–38, and a choir vestry was added, the cost of these additions being £5,253.

== Architecture ==
St Stephen's is constructed in red and brown sandstone with green slate roofs, and is in Free Perpendicular style. Its plan consists of a nave with a clerestory and a south porch, north and south aisles, a chancel with a canted east end, a south vestry, and a single gabled bellcote standing at right angles to the south side of the chancel. At the west end are broad buttresses, with a canted baptistry between them. The west window has four lights, the east window has five lights, and the clerestory windows have three lights. Pollard and Pevsner in the Buildings of England series comment that it is "an odd time" for the architect to be continuing to use the style of the practice during the 1880s. (Note: During the 1880s the partners in the Lancaster practice were Henry Paley's father, EG Paley, and Hubert Austin.) The two-manual pipe organ, the third to be installed in the church, was made in 1964 by J. W. Walker & Sons Ltd. In 2011 the pipe organ was replaced with an electronic imitation produced by Johannus of Holland.

== See also ==
- List of churches in Greater Manchester
- Listed buildings in Wigan
- List of ecclesiastical works by Austin and Paley (1916–44)

== Bibliography ==
- Brandwood, Geoff; Austin, Tim; Hughes, John; Price, James (2012). The Architecture of Sharpe, Paley and Austin. Swindon: English Heritage. ISBN 978-1-84802-049-8.
- Pollard, Richard; Pevsner, Nikolaus (2006). Lancashire: Liverpool and the South-West. The Buildings of England. New Haven and London: Yale University Press. ISBN 0-300-10910-5.
