= St Mary Magdalene's Church, Ribbleton =

Coordinates: 53.7765°N 2.6603°W

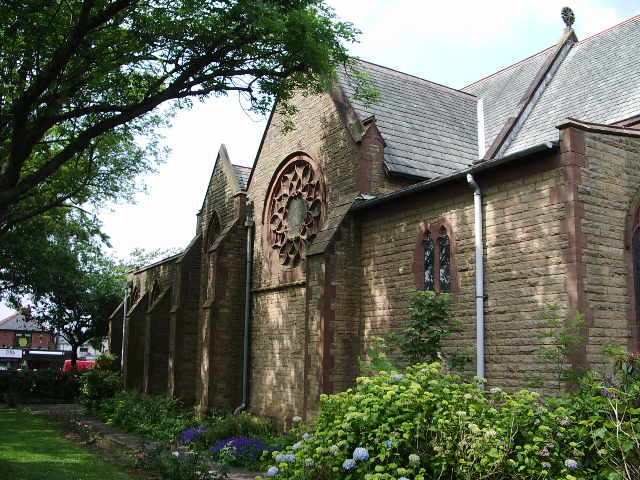
- St Mary Magdalene's Church, Ribbleton

- Location in Preston
- OS grid reference: SD 56582 31330
- Location: Ribbleton Avenue, Ribbleton, Preston, Lancashire
- Country: England
- Denomination: Anglican
- Website: St Mary Magdalene, Ribbleton

History
- Status: Parish church
- Dedication: Saint Mary Magdalene

Architecture
- Functional status: Active
- Architect(s): R. Knill Freeman; Austin and Paley
- Architectural type: Church
- Style: Gothic Revival
- Groundbreaking: 1888
- Completed: 1941

Specifications
- Materials: Sandstone

Administration
- Province: York
- Diocese: Blackburn
- Archdeaconry: Lancaster
- Deanery: Preston
- Parish: Ribbleton

Clergy
- Rector: Rvd Linda Tomkinson

St Mary Magdalene's Church is in Ribbleton Avenue, Ribbleton, Preston, Lancashire, England. It is an active Anglican parish church in the deanery of Preston, the archdeaconry of Lancaster, and the diocese of Blackburn. Its benefice is united with that of The Church of the Ascension, Ribbleton.

== History ==
The church was built in 1888–91 to a design by R. Knill Freeman. Additions were made to it in about 1901 by the Lancaster architects Austin and Paley, and again by the same architectural practice in 1938–41, with a new chancel, chapel, aisles and vestries.

== Architecture ==
St Mary's is constructed in red sandstone with dressings in yellow sandstone. It contains features in Decorated style. Its plan includes short aisles, and transepts of two unequal bays. Along the aisles are parapets hiding the roof. There is a large rose windows in each transept. The authors of the Buildings of England series describe it as "an odd building" that "was never finished".

== See also ==
- List of ecclesiastical works by Austin and Paley (1895–1914)
- List of ecclesiastical works by Austin and Paley (1916–44)
