= St Hilda's Church, Bilsborrow =

Coordinates: 53.8522°N 2.7421°W

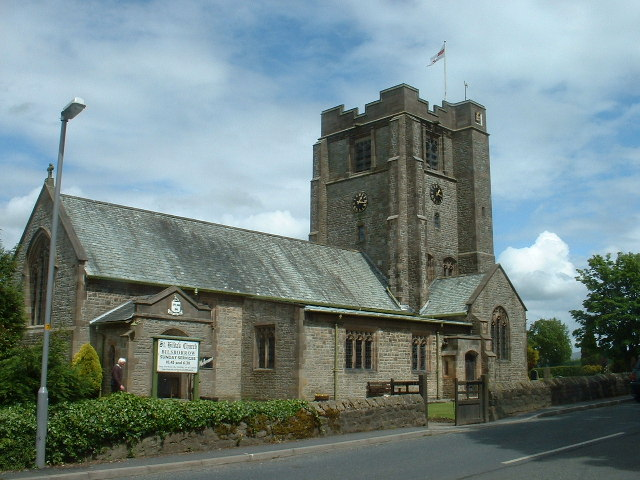
- St Hilda's Church, Bilsborrow, from the southwest

- Location in the Borough of Wyre
- OS grid reference: SD 51279 39805
- Location: Bilsborrow Lane, Bilsborrow, Lancashire
- Country: England
- Denomination: Anglican
- Website: St Hilda, Bilsborrow

History
- Status: Parish church
- Dedication: Saint Hilda

Architecture
- Functional status: Active
- Architect: Henry Paley
- Architectural type: Church
- Style: Gothic Revival
- Groundbreaking: 1926
- Completed: 1927

Specifications
- Materials: Stone, slate roof

Administration
- Province: York
- Diocese: Blackburn
- Archdeaconry: Lancaster
- Deanery: Garstang
- Parish: Bilsborrow

Clergy
- Rector: Revd Gregor Stewart

St Hilda's Church is in Bilsborrow Lane in the village of Bilsborrow, Lancashire, England. It is an active Anglican parish church in the deanery of Garstang, the archdeaconry of Lancaster, and the diocese of Blackburn. Its benefice is united with those of St Mary the Virgin, Goosnargh, St Lawrence, Barton, St Eadmer, Bleasdale, and St James, Whitechapel, to form the Fellside Team Ministry.

== History ==
St Hilda's was built in 1926–27, and designed by Henry Paley of the Lancaster firm of architects Austin and Paley at a cost of £11,640 (equivalent to £630,000 in 2025). The foundation stone was laid by the Rt Revd William Temple, then the Bishop of Manchester (later the Archbishop of Canterbury).

== Architecture ==
The church is constructed in stone with a slate roof. The architectural style is Free Perpendicular. It has a low tower at the crossing, with a stair turret at its southeast corner, and texts inscribed above the bell openings. Inside the church, the pulpit is decorated with carvings of vines. The stained glass includes two windows by Shrigley and Hunt dating from the 1960s or 1970s. The two-manual pipe organ was built in 1938 by Wilkinson of Kendal. There is a ring of eight bells, all cast in 1949 by Mears and Stainbank of the Whitechapel Bell Foundry.

== See also ==
- List of ecclesiastical works by Austin and Paley (1916–44)
