= St Thomas' Church, Blackpool =

Coordinates: 53.8215°N 3.0396°W

St Thomas' Church
- Location in Blackpool Location in Lancashire
- OS grid reference: SD 31659 36636
- Location: Blackpool, Lancashire
- Country: England
- Denomination: Church of England
- Churchmanship: Open Evangelical/New Wine
- Website: stthomasblackpool.org

History
- Status: Parish church

Architecture
- Functional status: Active
- Architect: Henry Paley
- Years built: 1930–1932

Administration
- Province: Province of York
- Diocese: Diocese of Blackburn
- Archdeaconry: Archdeaconry of Lancaster
- Deanery: Deanery of Blackpool

Clergy
- Vicar: The Revd David O’Brien

St Thomas' Church is in Caunce Street, Blackpool, Lancashire, England. It is an active Anglican parish church in the Deanery of Blackpool, the Archdeaconry of Lancaster and the Diocese of Blackburn.

== History ==
The church was built in 1930–32 and designed by the Lancaster architect Henry Paley of Austin and Paley, and cost £10,326 (equivalent to £620,000 in 2025). It is constructed in brick with stone dressings, and has windows with mixed Decorated and Perpendicular tracery. Only the east end of the church and 3½ bays of the nave and aisles were completed. Brandwood and his co-authors consider that the interior is "of dignity and with several inventive touches". Because it was never completed, Hartwell and Pevsner in the Buildings of England series describe it as "a stump of a church".

=== Present day ===
It continues to be an active church in the Evangelical tradition.

The vicar is the Revd David O’Brien.

== See also ==
- List of ecclesiastical works by Austin and Paley (1916–44)
