= Church of St Stephen on-the-Cliffs, Blackpool =

Coordinates: 53.8407°N 3.0514°W

Church of St Stephen on-the-Cliffs
- Location in Blackpool
- OS grid reference: SD 30914 38783
- Location: St Stephen's Avenue, Blackpool, Lancashire
- Country: England
- Denomination: Anglican
- Churchmanship: Anglo-Catholic
- Website: St Stephen on-the-Cliffs, Blackpool

History
- Status: Parish church
- Consecrated: 1927

Architecture
- Functional status: Active
- Architect: Henry Paley
- Architectural type: Church
- Style: Gothic Revival
- Groundbreaking: 1925
- Completed: 2002

Specifications
- Materials: Brick exterior with stone dressings Sandstone interior

Administration
- Province: York
- Diocese: Blackburn
- Archdeaconry: Lancaster
- Deanery: Blackpool
- Parish: St Stephen, Blackpool

Clergy
- Bishop: Rt Revd Philip North (AEO)
- Vicar: Fr Andrew Teather

The Church of St Stephen on-the-Cliffs is on Holmfield Road, Blackpool, Lancashire, England. It is an active Anglican parish church in the deanery of Blackpool, the archdeaconry of Lancaster, and the diocese of Blackburn.

== History ==
St Stephen's originated as a mission church to All Hallows Church, Bispham, and was opened in 1912. It became known as "The Church on the Cliffs". In 1919 St Stephen's became a parish in its own right. The mission church was too small to accommodate its growing congregation, and money was raised to build a new, larger church on a site to the north of the mission church. Its foundation stone was laid by the Rt Revd William Temple, then the Bishop of Manchester (later the Archbishop of Canterbury), on 1 July 1925. The architect was Henry Paley of the Lancaster firm of architects Austin and Paley. In 1927 the church was consecrated by the Rt Revd Percy Herbert, the first Bishop of Blackburn, although only the east end and the first two bays had been completed. The church cost £20,000 (equivalent to £1,090,000 in 2025), and provided seating for 400 people. (Note: If the full plan had been completed, it would have cost £35,000, and provided 800 seats.) The church built up a strong relationship with actors and entertainers appearing in the local theatres, and in 1929 the Actors' Chapel was created in the church. In 1949 a columbarium (a chapel for the storage of cinerary urns) was added to the church, to a design by Edwin Carpenter. Further additions were made in 2001–02 by Stephen Eccles, consisting of a porch, a narthex, and a baptistry. The former mission church survives, and is used as the parish hall.

== Architecture ==
The church is constructed in bright red brick with stone dressings. The windows contain tracery in Decorated style. The plan of the church includes north and south chapels, the columbarium to the north, the baptistry to the northeast, and the narthex to the west. The interior of the church is lined with red sandstone. The furnishings in the choir, dating from 1927, are decorated with finely carved figures of angel musicians and saints. The integral pulpit is in red sandstone and is carved with saints under canopies and foliage. The Actors' Chapel forms part of the north aisle. Its reredos is painted with figures representing singers, dancers, entertainers and Saint Genesius, the patron saint of actors. On the walls of the chapel are alabaster tablets inscribed with the names of entertainers, including Noël Coward, Sybil Thorndike, Arthur Askey, George Formby, Ivor Novello, and Edith Evans. The stained glass includes a window by Baron Arild Rosencrantz, dated 1935, with depictions of Parsifal, representing opera, Everyman, representing drama, and Galahad. This was created in memory of John Huddlestone, an impresario, and John Tiller, the creator of the Tiller Girls. Elsewhere is stained glass by Shrigley and Hunt dating from the 1930s, and by Harry Stammers from the 1960s. Also in the church is a statue of the Madonna donated by Tessie O'Shea. The three-manual pipe organ was built by Henry Willis between 1881 and 1895. It was formerly in St Philip's Church, Blackburn, and was moved to St Stephen's in about 1975 when St Philip's was demolished.

== See also ==
- List of ecclesiastical works by Austin and Paley (1916–44)
