= St Michael's Church, Middleton =

Coordinates: 53.5477°N 2.1906°W

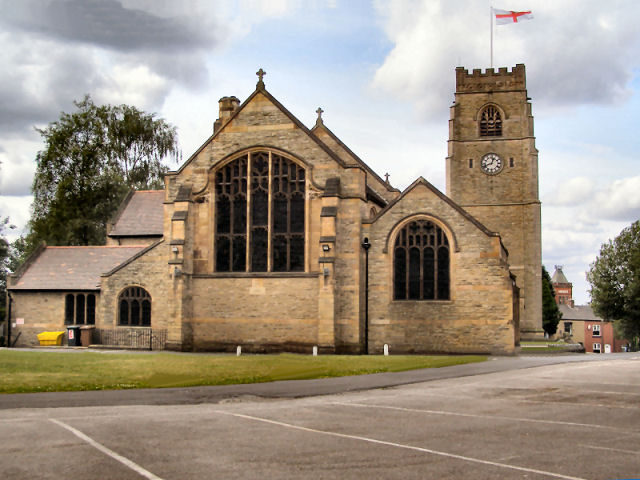

- Location in Greater Manchester
- OS grid reference: SD 875,057
- Location: Townley Street, Middleton, Greater Manchester
- Country: England
- Denomination: Anglican
- Website: St Michael, Middleton

History
- Status: Parish church
- Dedication: Saint Michael

Architecture
- Functional status: Active
- Heritage designation: Grade II
- Designated: 19 September 1969
- Architect: Austin and Paley
- Architectural type: Church
- Style: Gothic Revival
- Groundbreaking: 1901
- Completed: 1930

Specifications
- Materials: Stone, tile roofs

Administration
- Province: York
- Diocese: Manchester
- Archdeaconry: Rochdale
- Deanery: Heywood and Middleton
- Parish: Tonge-cum-Alkrington

Clergy
- Vicar: Revd Jenni Beaumont

St Michael's Church is in Townley Street, Middleton, Greater Manchester, England. It is an active Anglican parish church in the deanery of Heywood and Middleton, the archdeaconry of Rochdale, and the diocese of Manchester. The church is recorded in the National Heritage List for England as a designated Grade II listed building.

== History ==
The church was built in 1901–02 replacing an earlier church on the site dating from 1839. It was paid for by J. W. Lees, a brewer. It was designed by the Lancaster firm of architects, Austin and Paley. At this time only the east end and the first bay of the nave were built. The nave was completed in 1911, and the tower was added between 1926 and 1931 at a cost of £6,656 (equivalent to £390,000 in 2025),

== Architecture ==
St Michael's is constructed in stone with a tile roof. Its architectural style is Perpendicular. The plan consists of a four-bay nave with a clerestory, north and south aisles, a chancel with a side chapel, vestry and organ chamber, and a virtually free-standing tower to the west of the north aisle. At the west end of the church is a canted baptistry. The tower is in four stages, with bands separating the stages. It has angle buttresses, an octagonal stair turret, a doorway over which is a four-light window, clock faces, three-light bell openings, and a castellated parapet. The windows along the sides of the aisles have two, three or four lights with flat heads; those in the clerestory have three lights under round-arched heads. Both the east and west windows have five lights. Inside the church the arcades are carried on octagonal piers. Most of the stained glass is by Shrigley and Hunt.

== See also ==
- List of churches in Greater Manchester
- Listed buildings in Middleton, Greater Manchester
- List of ecclesiastical works by Austin and Paley (1895–1916)
- List of ecclesiastical works by Austin and Paley (1916–44)
