= St Mary the Virgin's Church, Walney =

Coordinates: 54.1067°N 3.2474°W

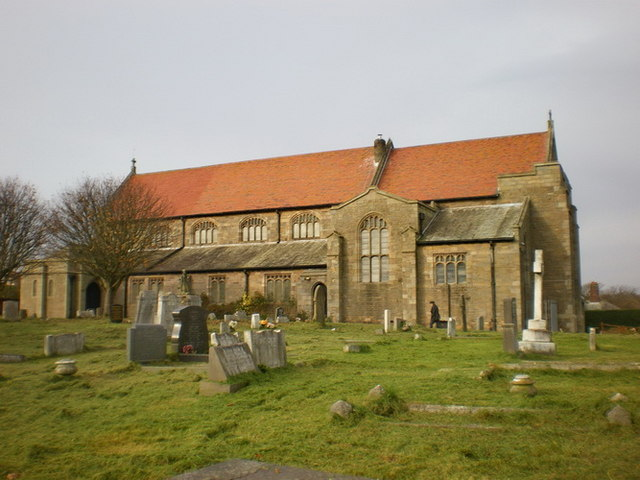
- St Mary the Virgin's Church, Walney, from the south

- Location in Cumbria
- OS grid reference: SD 185,686
- Location: Promenade, Walney Island, Barrow-in-Furness, Cumbria
- Country: England
- Denomination: Anglican
- Website: St Mary the Virgin, Walney

History
- Status: Parish church
- Dedication: Saint Mary the Virgin

Architecture
- Functional status: Active
- Heritage designation: Grade II
- Designated: 6 May 1976
- Architect: Austin and Paley
- Architectural type: Church
- Style: Gothic Revival
- Groundbreaking: 1907
- Completed: 1931

Administration
- Province: York
- Diocese: Carlisle
- Archdeaconry: Westmorland and Furness
- Deanery: Barrow
- Parish: St Mary the Virgin, Walney Island

St Mary the Virgin's Church is located on the Promenade, Walney Island, Barrow-in-Furness. Cumbria, England. It is an active Anglican parish church in the deanery of Barrow, the archdeaconry of Westmorland and Furness, and the diocese of Carlisle. The church is recorded in the National Heritage List for England as a designated Grade II listed building.

== History ==
A church was built on the site in about 1690 replacing an earlier church. This was itself replaced in 1852–53 by a new church designed by the Lancaster architects Sharpe and Paley. Its estimated cost was £520 (equivalent to £60,000 in 2025), and it provided seating for 184 people. It was an aisleless chapel with an octagonal bell turret. This church was again replaced in 1907–08 by the present church, designed by the successors in the practice, Austin and Paley. This much larger church was made necessary by the increase in the size of the local population from about 500 in 1891 to about 5,000 in 1903. The same Lancaster practice was involved again in 1930–31, when an additional bay was added to the west end of the nave together with a new vestry and a south porch at a cost of £4,597. It was intended to build a tower at the crossing, but this never transpired.

== Architecture ==
The church is constructed in sandstone, and has roofs of tile, slate and lead. Its architectural style is Gothic Revival with Perpendicular details. The plan consists of a five-bay nave with a clerestory, north and south aisles, north and south transepts, and a two-bay chancel with a south chapel and a north vestry. The windows along the sides of the aisles have two or three lights, and those in the clerestory have four lights. At the west end of the church is a four-light window flanked by buttresses, above which is a quatrefoil window. On the apex of the gable is a cross. There are three-light windows in the transepts and chapel, and the vestry has two four-light windows. The east window has five lights and a crenellated transom, and is flanked by buttresses. Inside the church, the octagonal font stands on colonettes, and the oak pulpit is on an ashlar plinth. The stained glass in the east window was designed by R .R. Nichol for Abbott and Company, and dates from about 1990. The two-manual pipe organ was made by Wadsworth and Company from Manchester.

== See also ==
- List of works by Sharpe and Paley
- List of ecclesiastical works by Austin and Paley (1895–1914)
- List of ecclesiastical works by Austin and Paley (1916–44)
