= St Margaret's Church, Halliwell =

Coordinates: 53.5844°N 2.4569°W

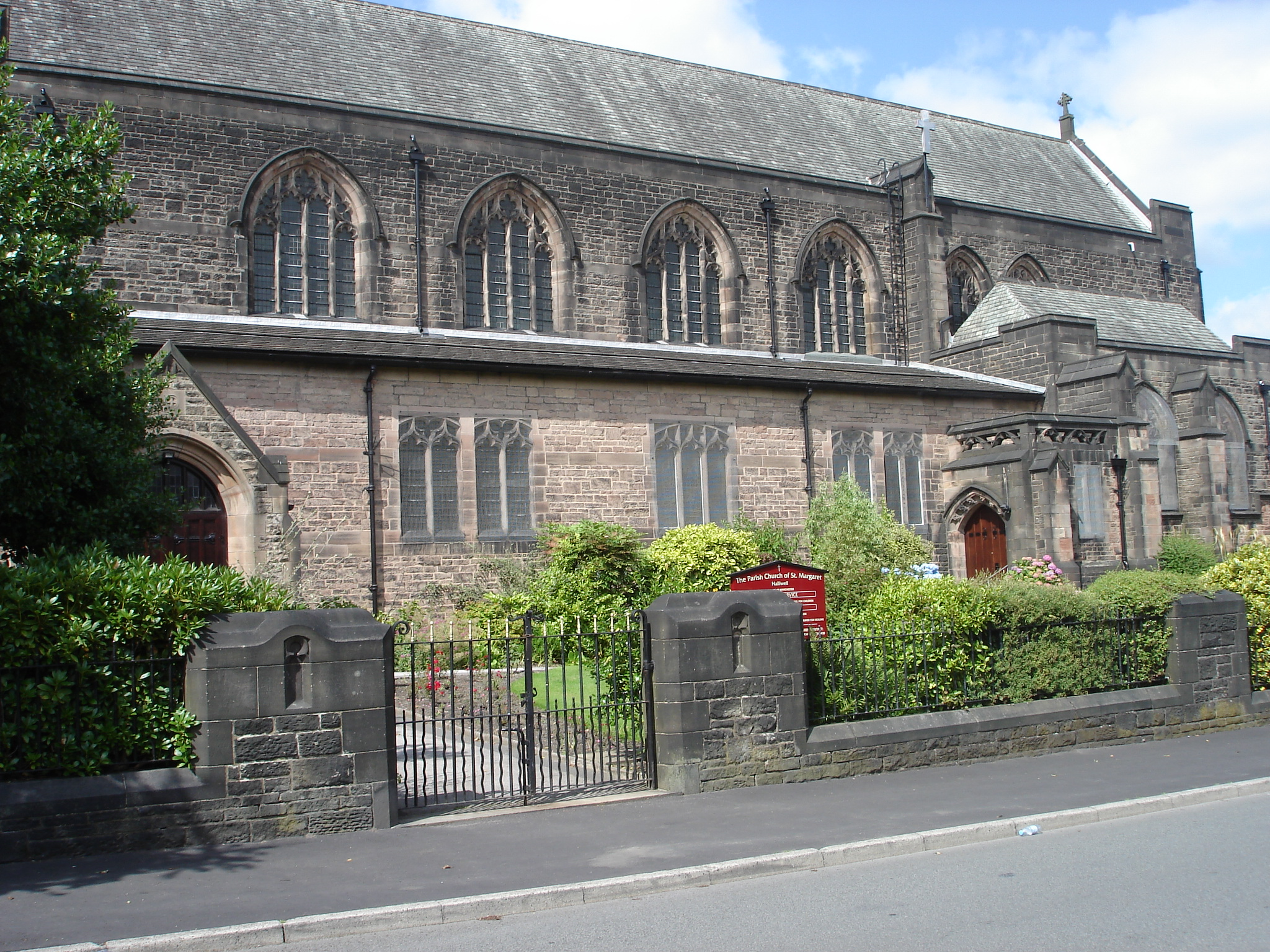

- Location in Greater Manchester
- OS grid reference: SD 69849 09852
- Location: Lonsdale Road, Halliwell, Bolton, Greater Manchester
- Country: England
- Denomination: Anglican
- Churchmanship: Liberal Catholic
- Website: St Margaret, Halliwell

History
- Status: Parish church
- Founded: 1903

Architecture
- Functional status: Active
- Architect: Austin and Paley
- Architectural type: Church
- Style: Gothic Revival

Specifications
- Materials: Stone

Administration
- Province: York
- Diocese: Manchester
- Archdeaconry: Bolton
- Deanery: Bolton
- Parish: St Margaret, Halliwell

Clergy
- Vicar: Revd Janet French

St Margaret's Church is in Lonsdale Road, Halliwell, Bolton, Greater Manchester, England. It is an active Anglican parish church in the deanery of Bolton, the archdeaconry of Bolton, and the diocese of Manchester. Its benefice is united with that of Christ Church, Heaton.

== History ==
St Margaret's was built in 1911–13, and was designed by the Lancaster architects Austin and Paley. In 1939 the same architects added a vestry and offices to the church. Its interior was subdivided in 1982 to form separate rooms at the west end.

== Architecture ==
The church is constructed in stone, with a plan consisting of a nave with a clerestory, north and south aisles, a south porch, a southeast porch, a chancel, and a southeast chapel with a canted east end. The tracery in the windows is in free Decorated style. Inside the church, the arcades are carried on alternate round and octagonal piers. The reredos dates from 1954 and contains mosaic and opus sectile. The stained glass includes the east window of 1937 by James Powell and Sons, a window on the north side of the church depicting Saint Margaret dated 1966 by Edith Norris, and a double window on the south side dating from 1921 by Humphries, Jackson and Ambler.

== See also ==
- List of churches in Greater Manchester
- List of ecclesiastical works by Austin and Paley (1895–1914)
- List of ecclesiastical works by Austin and Paley (1916–44)
