= St John the Evangelist's Church, Crawshawbooth =

Coordinates: 53.7226°N 2.2892°W

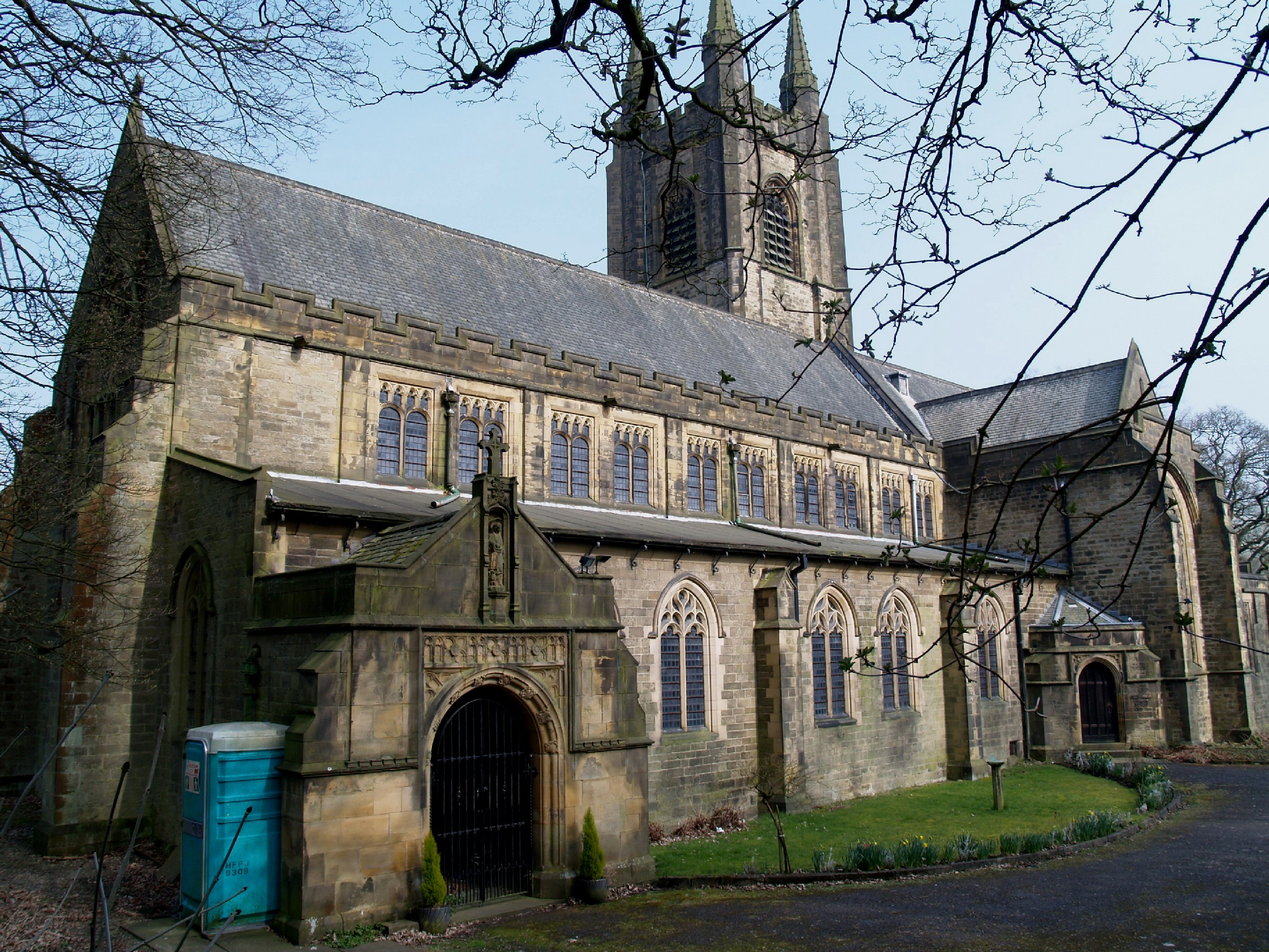
- St John the Evangelist's Church, Crawshawbooth, from the southwest

- Location in the Borough of Rossendale
- OS grid reference: SD 810,252
- Location: Crawshawbooth, near Rawtenstall, Lancashire
- Country: England
- Denomination: Anglican
- Website: St John, Crawshawbooth

History
- Status: Parish church
- Dedication: Saint John the Evangelist

Architecture
- Functional status: Non-Active
- Heritage designation: Grade II*
- Designated: 7 June 1971
- Architect: Paley, Austin and Paley
- Architectural type: Church
- Style: Gothic Revival
- Groundbreaking: 1890
- Completed: 1892

Administration
- Province: York
- Diocese: Manchester
- Archdeaconry: Bolton
- Deanery: Rossendale
- Parish: St John Crawshawbooth

Clergy
- Vicar: Revd Dr J. S. Montgomery

St John the Evangelist's Church is in the village of Crawshawbooth, near Rawtenstall, Lancashire, England. It is a redundant Anglican parish church formerly in the deanery of Rossendale, the archdeaconry of Bolton, and the diocese of Manchester. Its benefice has been united with that of St Mary and All Saints, Goodshaw. The church is recorded in the National Heritage List for England as a designated Grade II* listed building.

== History ==
St John's was built between 1890 and 1892 to a design by the Lancaster architects Paley, Austin and Paley. The estimated cost of the church was £6,800 but, because of problems with the foundations, its final cost, including the fittings, was nearer to £12,000 (equivalent to £1,320,000 in 2025). It provided seating for 616 people. Financial donations towards the site and structure of the church were made by Thomas Brooks, 1st Baron Crawshaw of Crawshaw Hall. Because of diminishing numbers attending the church, and because of thefts of lead from the roof of the church, the congregation has decided to opt for the church to be declared redundant. The church was declared redundant on 20 February 2012.

== Architecture ==
=== Exterior ===
The church is constructed in sandstone with Yorkshire stone dressings and is roofed in green Cumberland slate. Its architectural style is Perpendicular. The plan consists of a nave and chancel in one range, north and south aisles, a south transept, and a north transept above which rises a tower. A clerestory rises above the aisles along the length of the nave, to the south of the chancel is a chapel, and to its north is a vestry. There is a porch in the westernmost bay of the south aisle, and another porch in the angle of the south transept. On each side of the clerestory are ten square-headed two-light windows. The west window has five lights and contains intersecting tracery. Along the aisles are buttresses and two-light windows. The south transept also has buttresses, and a large five-light window containing Perpendicular and curvilinear tracery. The chancel has a large east window with six lights containing Perpendicular tracery. The tower has diagonal corner buttresses that rise to octagonal turrets surmounted by crocketed pinnacles. The summit of the tower has an embattled parapet.

=== Interior ===
The interior of the church is lined with red Rainhill sandstone. The five-bay arcades are carried alternately on round and octagonal columns. The chancel arch is high, and has two orders of moulding. There are carved wooden screens between the nave and the chancel, and between the chancel and the north transept. Some of the choir stalls have elaborately carved crocketed canopies containing statues. The reredos dates from the 20th century, and contains statues of the Four Evangelists. The font is hexagonal. In the church are memorials to members of the Brooks family. Inside the tower, and near to the tower, are carved texts from Psalm 148.

=== Future ===
As of 2020 the Church is on the English Heritage "Heritage at Risk Register". With its condition being described as "Very Bad".

The Church was also listed on the Victorian Society's 2013 "Top 10 Endangered Buildings" List.

A local group "Save St Johns" is trying to find a new use for the church to benefit both local people and business.

== See also ==
- Listed buildings in Rawtenstall
- List of works by Paley, Austin and Paley
