= Bare, Morecambe =

Area of Morecambe, Lancashire, England

Coordinates: 54.076°N 2.837°W

Bare
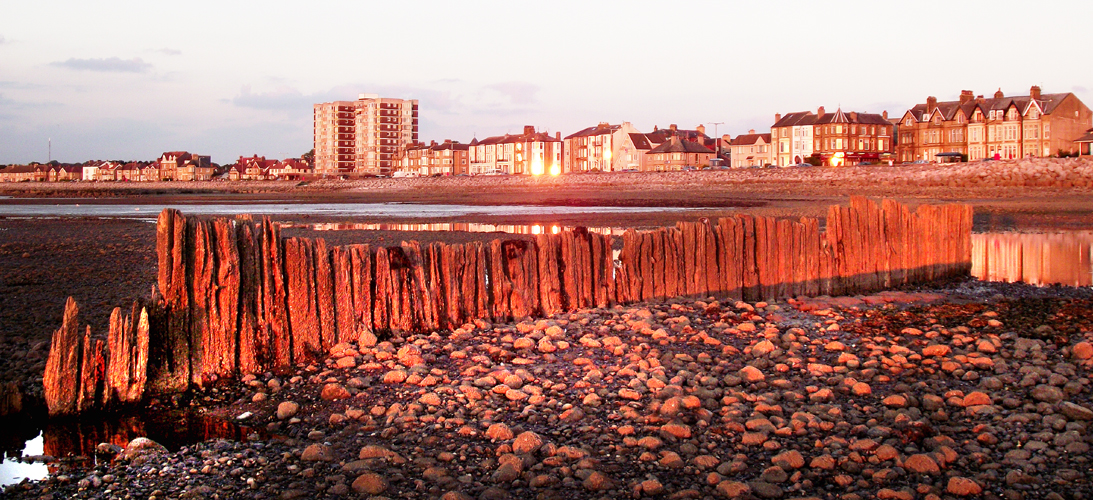
- Beach and promenade

- Location in Morecambe Location in the City of Lancaster district Location within Lancashire
- Population: 4,067 (2011)
- OS grid reference: SD452647
- Civil parish: Morecambe
- District: City of Lancaster
- Shire county: Lancashire
- Region: North West
- Country: England
- Sovereign state: United Kingdom
- Post town: MORECAMBE
- Postcode district: LA4
- Dialling code: 01524
- Police: Lancashire
- Fire: Lancashire
- Ambulance: North West
- UK Parliament: Morecambe and Lunesdale

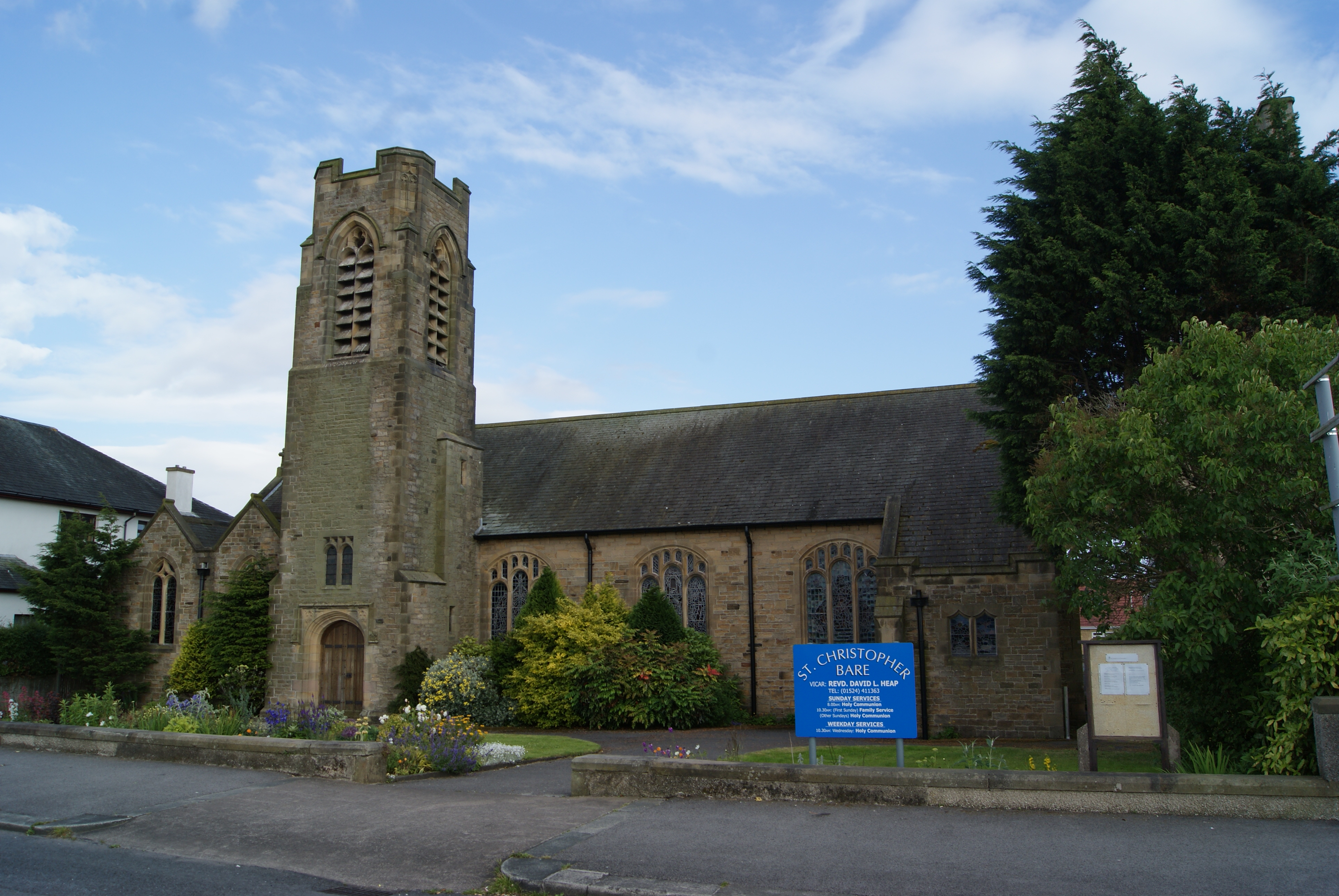
St Christopher's Church, Bare

Bare is a suburb of and electoral ward in Morecambe, within the City of Lancaster district in Lancashire, England. The population of the ward as taken at the Census 2011 was 4,067. Bare has a high street (Princes Crescent), and a railway station connecting it to Morecambe and Lancaster. Its name comes from Anglo-Saxon bearu meaning "grove".

Bare Hall is a Grade II listed building built around 1830 by the Lodge family.
