= Basford, Staffordshire =

Suburb of Newcastle-under-Lyme, Staffordshire, England

Coordinates: 53.0194°N 2.2126°W

Basford

- Location within Staffordshire
- OS grid reference: SJ858469
- District: Newcastle-under-Lyme
- Shire county: Staffordshire
- Region: West Midlands
- Country: England
- Sovereign state: United Kingdom
- Post town: NEWCASTLE
- Postcode district: ST5
- Dialling code: 01782
- Police: Staffordshire
- Fire: Staffordshire
- Ambulance: West Midlands
- UK Parliament: Newcastle-under-Lyme

Basford is a suburb of Newcastle-under-Lyme, which lies on high ground near to Stoke-on-Trent, in Staffordshire, England.

== History ==
The Roman road of Rykeneld Street from Wolstanton to Stoke ran through Basford.

Basford's lofty position was first served by a 1759 turnpike road which was called Fowlea Bank by the 1770s; the name referred to the Fowlea Brook, which runs through nearby Etruria and has formed the valley. This old road still exists today, complete with its steep 1-in-8 gradient, surmounted by the substantial Queen's Arms Inn, first built in 1769.

After descending this bank, the crossing of the Fowlea into Etruria was then often a matter of fording the swampy valley bottom. This may have given rise to the later recorded name of Basford, being a local conflation of 'Bank' and 'Ford'.

In 1828, an easier 1-in-14 deep road cutting was made a short distance from the old road; thereafter, this became the main road linking Etruria with Wolstanton and Newcastle-under-Lyme. The banked footings at the base of this new road swept very high above the Fowlea Brook, ensuring easy passage across the valley bottom in all weathers. The new bank began to being referred to in documents as Basford Hill or Basford Bank by the 1830s.

Due to abundant well-drained clay all along the valley ridge, tile and brick making is documented here as far back as the late 1600s. Rhead's book Staffordshire Pots and Potters (1906) found only a one-man water-pipe business in Basford at 1818, but noted traces of a possible early pottery: "... there were scattered foundations of what might have been a pottery in King's fields, with the remains of low arches as of oven or kiln 'mouths'." During the 1830s, the area along the base of the escarpment featured the full range of brick and tile yards and small ceramics manufactories, increasingly working at an industrial scale. Despite this, substantial pockets of fields and woods persisted, notably the Etruria Woods. As late as 1929, aerial photography reveals large fields of corn and wheat being harvested directly alongside large tile-works at Basford.

Basford Lawn Tennis Club was founded in 1883 and was originally sited on the present-day car park, behind The Queen's Hotel (formerly the Queen's Arms Inn); it moved to its present location of West Avenue in 1926. The club hosted an exhibition match between Fred Perry and Bunny Austin on 11 May 1936.

From the 1890s onwards, the area saw substantial development of vegetable growing allotments, many of which are extant today as large active allotment sites.

Hartshill and Basford Halt railway station was located on the Market Drayton branch of the North Staffordshire Railway; this enabled Basford people to travel to Newcastle-under-Lyme and Keele by train. The Halt closed in 1926.

The Potteries Loop Line local railway, between Etruria and Kidsgrove, was closed during the Beeching axe cuts in spring 1964. This meant it was no longer possible to travel from Etruria to Hanley or Burslem by train.

In the 1970s, a very major physical intervention in the geography of the area was the construction of the A500 road, running north–south along the escarpment bottom. This involved a complex new road interchange being built at the bottom of Basford Bank.

In 1986, Basford became home to Europe's first purpose-built theatre in the round, when the New Vic Theatre was built on the Newcastle-under-Lyme side of Basford. This replaced the nearby Victoria Theatre at Hartshill.

As some heavy industry closed, various open space regeneration and reclamation schemes were undertaken from the 1990s onwards. For instance, at Haydon Street there is now a large tree-edged playing field known as Basford Open Space which is now called Basford Park. The field was once the site of industrial works, but has seen major reclamation and improvements, including a paved cycle-path. Another new feature of the area is the extensive and modern children's play area, nicknamed The Grum, on a former railway tunnel entrance between Victoria Street and the Shelton New Road; it also includes sports features such as skate ramps and a basketball court.

== Transport ==
Etruria railway station was closed to passengers in 2005; it was sited very near to the foot of the Basford Bank and served Basford.

The nearest National Rail stations are at Longport, on the Crewe to Derby line, and Stoke-on-Trent for principal services to Manchester Piccadilly and London Euston on the West Coast Main Line.

Basford is served by three bus services, operated by First Potteries. These connect the area with Newcastle-Under-Lyme, Burslem, Hanley, Kidsgrove and Tunstall.

== Religion ==
The Church of England parish church of Basford is St. Mark's Church on Basford Park Road in the deanery of Newcastle-under-Lyme.

There is also a Seventh-day Adventist church on Victoria Street, which was registered for worship in 1948.

Basford had a Wesleyan Methodist chapel opposite St. Mark's Church on Basford Park Road. Built by 1902, it was demolished in the early 2000s and the site was redeveloped with apartments.

== Literary associations ==
The writer H.G. Wells lived in Basford from March to June 1888, while convalescing from illness. In his autobiography, he wrote "I found... the strange landscape of the Five Towns with its blazing iron foundries, its steaming canals, its clay-whitened pot-banks and the marvellous effects of its dust and smoke-laden atmosphere, very stimulating..." "...at Etruria my real writing began..." There he began the early drafts of what would become his famous The Time Machine (1895). He planned a vast melodrama set in the Five Towns, but the only section known to survive is the macabre short story "The Cone".
