= Sharpe, Paley and Austin =

Architectural firm

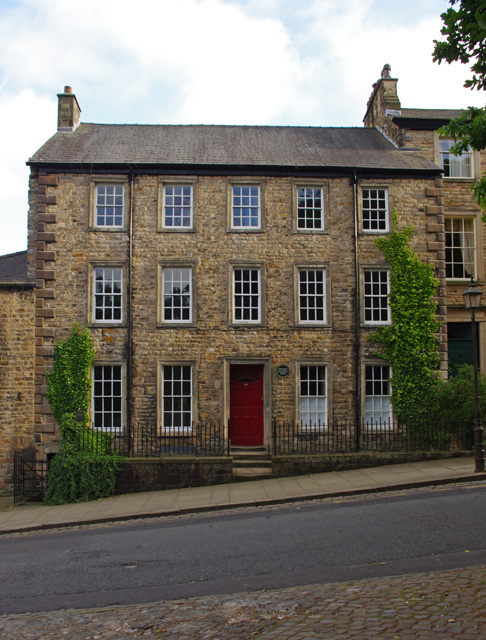
Offices of the practice in Castle Hill, Lancaster, from 1860 until it closed in 1946

Sharpe, Paley and Austin are the surnames of architects who practised in Lancaster, Lancashire, England, between 1835 and 1946, working either alone or in partnership. The full names of the principals in their practice, which went under various names during its life, are Edmund Sharpe (1809–77); Edward Graham Paley (1823–95), who practised as E. G. Paley; Hubert James Austin (1841–1915); Henry Anderson Paley (1859–1946), son of Edward, usually known as Harry Paley; and, for a very brief period, Geoffrey Langshaw Austin (1884–1971), son of Hubert. The firm's commissions were mainly for buildings in Lancashire and what is now Cumbria, but also in Yorkshire, Cheshire, the West Midlands, North Wales, and Hertfordshire.

The practice specialised in work on churches; the design of new churches, restoring older churches, and making additions or alterations. They also designed country houses, and made alterations to existing houses. Almost all their churches were designed in Gothic Revival style, except for some of Sharpe's earliest churches and a few designed later by the practice. Within the Gothic Revival style, the practice initially used Early English and, particularly, Decorated features. E. G. Paley introduced Perpendicular elements, and Perpendicular became the dominant style used by the practice following the arrival of Hubert Austin, to such a degree that the firm became regarded as the regional leader in the use of that style.

The practice used a greater variety of styles when working on country houses, including Elizabethan and Jacobean elements as well as Gothic. Other features were incorporated towards the end of the 19th century similar to those in works produced by the Aesthetic and the Arts and Crafts Movements. Not all the firm's work was on a large scale; as the major architectural practice in North West England they also undertook work on schools, vicarages, hospitals, factories, hotels, shops, railway stations, and war memorials.

== History and works ==
During the life of the practice its title varied according to the names of the architects who ran it, either individually or in partnership. The history of the practice, and the works produced during each stage, are described under the titles used by the practice. (Note: In the cases of Edmund Sharpe, and Sharpe and Paley the words "Architect" and "Architects" have been omitted. From 1916 until his death, Harry Paley ran the practice alone, but continued to use the title Austin and Paley.) As there are two periods when the practice worked under the title Austin and Paley, the relevant dates have been added to these headings.

=== Edmund Sharpe ===
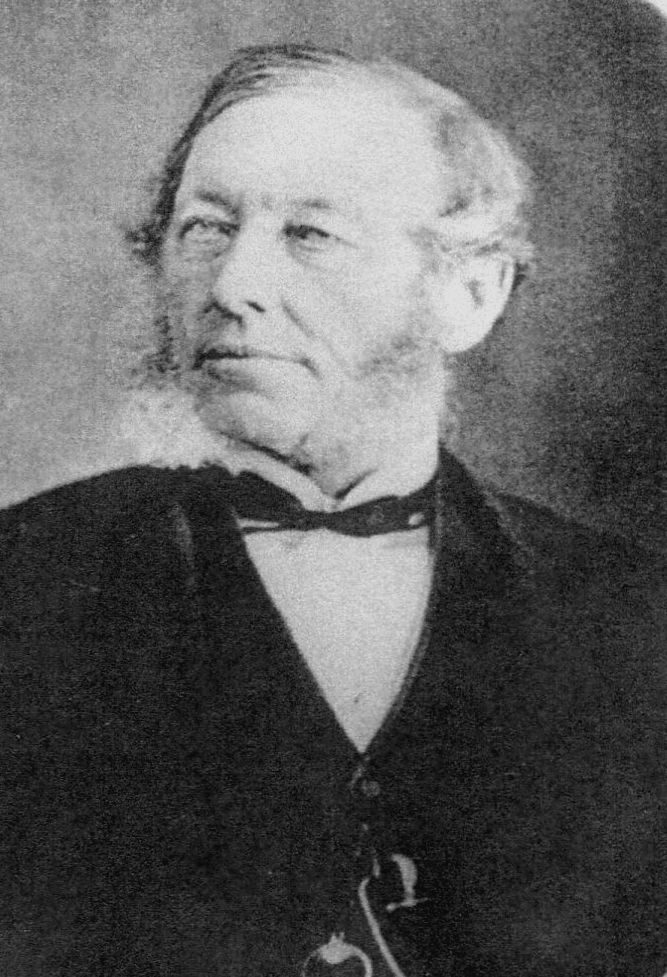
Edmund Sharpe

Edmund Sharpe established an architectural practice in his mother's house in Penny Street, Lancaster, in late 1835. He had received no formal training in architecture, gaining his knowledge from studying and drawing buildings during a tour of Germany and France between 1832 and 1835. In 1838 he moved his office to Sun Street, and that year Edward Paley, then aged 15, joined him as a pupil. The following year Sharpe moved his office again, this time to St Leonard's Gate.

Sharpe's earliest commissions were for churches, the first being St Mark, Witton (1836–38), quickly followed by St Saviour's Church, Cuerden (1836–37). He then designed two small chapels, Holy Trinity, Howgill, and St John, Cowgill (both 1837–38), in what is now Cumbria. Larger and grander churches followed, including Christ Church, Walmsley (1839–40), and his largest church, Holy Trinity, Blackburn (1837–48). The latter was a Commissioners' church, so-called because it was partly financed by a grant from the Church Building Commissioners. In all, Sharpe designed six Commissioner's churches, including St George, Stalybridge (1838–40). In the early 1840s Sharpe gained a commission from the trustees of the Weaver Navigation to build three (or four) churches along its route for their employees. By 1842 he was designing his 31st church, including a long hoped for commission from the 13th Earl of Derby to design St Mary, Knowsley (1843–44).

Sharpe was persuaded by his future brother-in-law John Fletcher, owner of Ladyshore Colliery, to experiment with the use of terracotta in the structure of his churches; not just for decoration, as had been done before, but for the whole structure of the church, other than the foundations and rubble infill. The churches resulting from this project were St Stephen and All Martyrs, Lever Bridge (1842–44), and Holy Trinity, Rusholme (1845–46). These were nicknamed by Sharpe himself as "the pot churches". (Note: This term was chosen because terracotta is commonly used as a material for the manufacture of plant pots.)

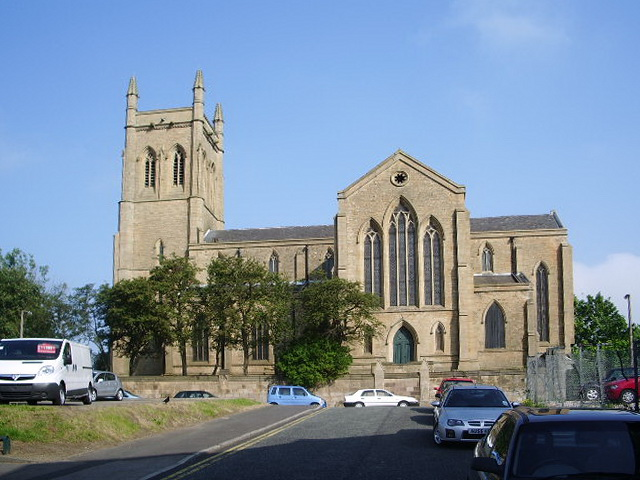
Holy Trinity Church, Blackburn, (1837–48) Sharpe's largest church

In addition to Edward Paley, Sharpe took on other pupils, some of whom later established their own architectural practices. One of these was Thomas Austin (1822–67), who joined Sharpe in 1841 and left in 1852 to set up his practice in Newcastle upon Tyne. Another pupil was John Douglas (1830–1911), who created a successful practice in Chester.

Sharpe's architectural works were not limited to churches, nor was his practice confined to architecture. His most important architectural work in the domestic field was his remodelling of Capernwray Hall (1844–48), and in Knutsford he designed a house for the governor of the gaol (1844). In 1838 he was appointed as architect to what was then called the County Lunatic Asylum (later Lancaster Moor Hospital). Here, in addition to carrying out minor repairs, he added a chapel and six additional wings for the residents. Other duties in this post included work on Lancaster Castle and the Judges Lodgings. Sharpe's other business interests were in the field of engineering. By 1837 he had been appointed Bridgemaster for the South Lonsdale Hundred, in which role he cared for the roads and bridges in north Lancashire, including building at least two new bridges. He had also become involved with the development of railways in the region, initially by designing bridges and a viaduct for the Lancaster and Preston Junction Railway (now part of the West Coast Main Line). He was also becoming involved in the civic life of Lancaster, having been elected as a councillor in 1841.

=== Sharpe and Paley ===
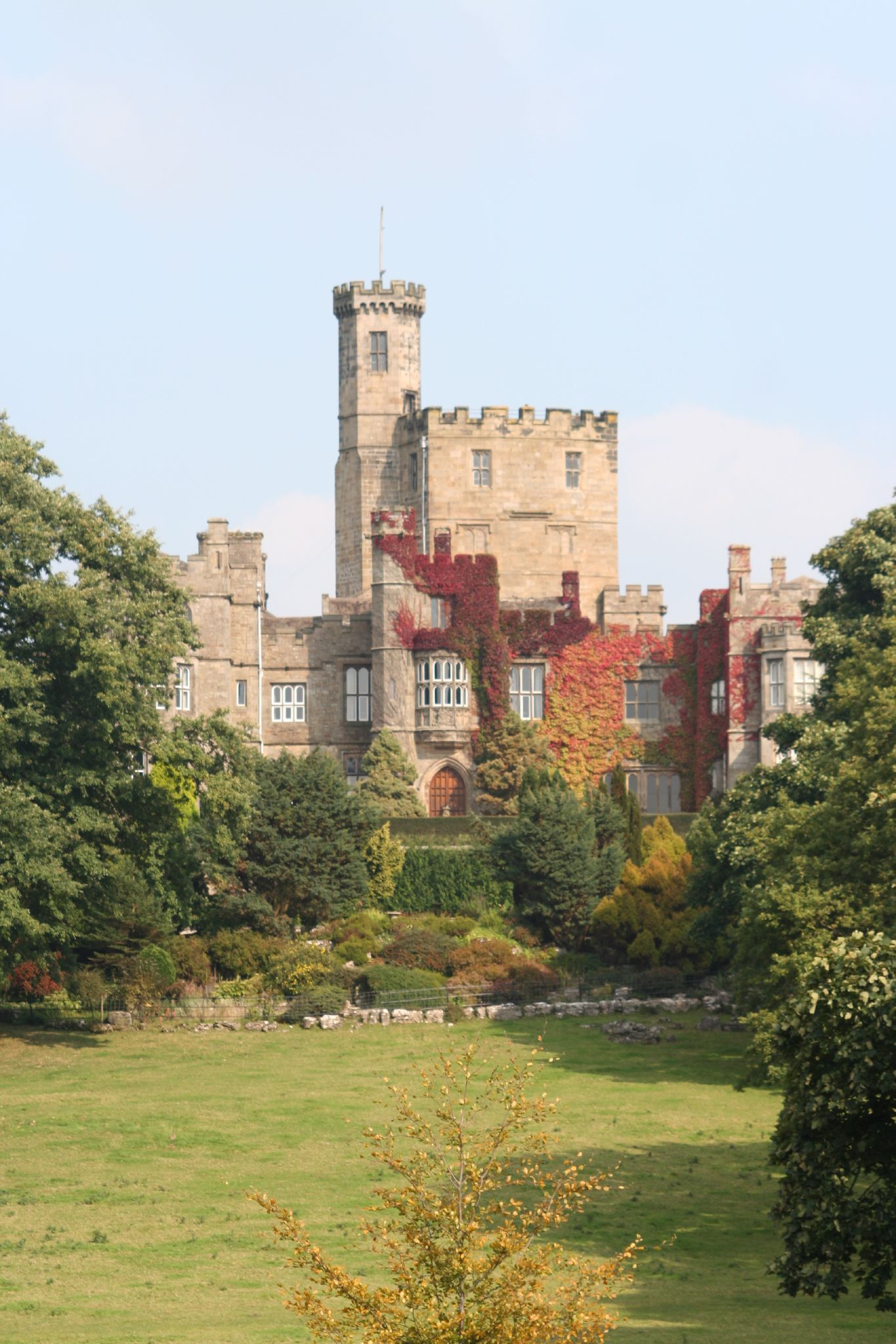
Hornby Castle to which Sharpe and Paley made additions and alterations between 1847 and 1852

Sharpe appointed Paley as his partner in 1845, and then took an increasing interest in activities outside the practice. By 1847 Paley was responsible for most of the work in the practice, certainly carrying out independent commissions from at least 1849. In 1851, the year of Paley's marriage to Sharpe's youngest sister, Frances, Sharpe formally withdrew from the practice, although it continued to be known as Sharpe and Paley until 1856. (Note: 1856 was the year in which Sharpe moved with his family to North Wales to design what is now the Conwy Valley Line.) Being the only major architect practising in the area between Preston and Carlisle, Paley took on commissions of all sizes and types but, like Sharpe, his major designs were for churches. Between 1851 and 1867 he designed or rebuilt about 36 new churches, almost all of them for the Church of England, with a small number for Congregationalists and Roman Catholics. Among his earlier churches were St Patrick, Preston Patrick (1852–53), St Anne, Thwaites (1853–54), and Christ Church, Bacup (1854).

The first secular work undertaken during this period was the remodelling of Hornby Castle between 1847 and 1852, including its "expansive" symmetrical frontage. The next commission was the conversion of a manor house close to the ruins of Furness Abbey into the Furness Abbey Hotel starting in 1847. Other secular commissions around this time were for two vicarages and for the North Western Hotel in Morecambe (1847), (Note: Its name was changed to the Midland Hotel in 1871. It was demolished in 1932 and replaced by a new building, also called the Midland Hotel.) and for work at Giggleswick School (1850–51). Paley also carried out work at Rossall School, including the chapel (1861–62), and the east range (1867). He designed new schools, including the Royal Grammar School in Lancaster (1851–52), and eight village schools. Paley's main domestic works were the rebuilding of Wennington Hall (1855–56), and a smaller house, The Ridding. Other varies commissions included the restoration of a music hall in Settle (1853), and cemetery buildings in Lancaster and Stalmine (1855 and 1856).

The rapid growth of the town of Barrow-in-Furness, the construction of the Furness Railway following the discovery of deposits of iron ore in the Furness peninsular, and the development of industries using iron as a raw material resulted in many commissions for the practice. The population of Barrow doubled between 1851 and 1861, and doubled again in the next decade. The major figure in the development of the town and the railway was James Ramsden (1822–96), who eventually became managing director of the railway, the Barrow Haematite Steel Company, and the Barrow Shipbuilding Company. The largest deposits of iron ore had been discovered in about 1850 by Henry Schneider in land owned by William Cavendish, who was at that time the 2nd Earl of Burlington, and who also played a part in the industry. All three men commissioned the practice to design a variety of buildings. In addition Paley designed a country house, Abbot's Wood (1857–59) for Ramsden, a large and complex building with Gothic and Tudor features. (Note: Abbot's Wood was demolished in 1960.)

=== E. G. Paley ===
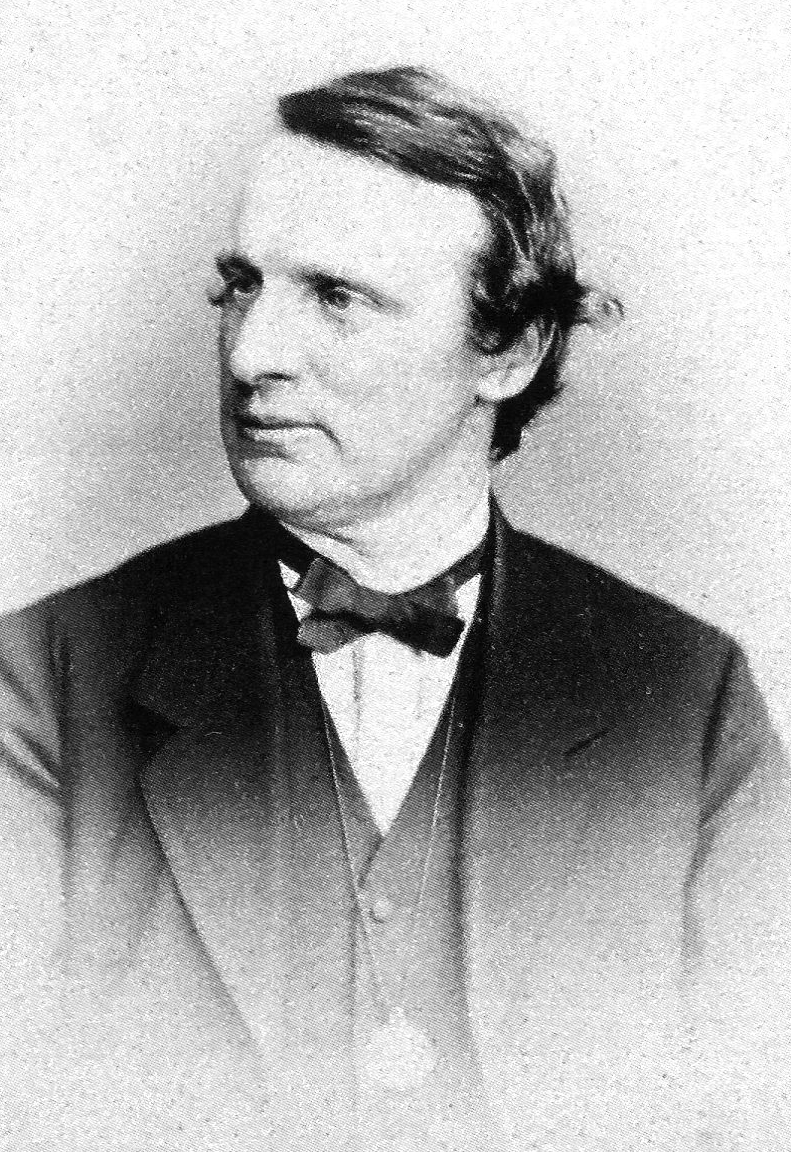
E. G. Paley

Paley continued to work from the offices in St Leonard's Gate after Sharpe's resignation, but in 1860 he moved to offices in Castle Hill, where the practice remained throughout the rest of its existence. During the 1850s he designed St Peter, Lancaster, a Roman Catholic church that later became Lancaster Cathedral (1857–59). This is regarded by Brandwood et al. as his "masterwork as an independent church architect". Hartwell et al. agree, calling this church, with its northwest steeple 240 feet (73 m) high, his chef d'oeuvre. During the 1860s, Paley began to design churches with bare brick interior walls, rather than plastered walls, the earliest being St Peter, Quernmore (1860). Although the High Victorian style was becoming popular elsewhere, it played little part in Paley's designs, other than more elaborate decorative features, such as the embellishment of the principal rafters at Quernmore. He never used the more blatant features of the style, such as polychromy. During this decade, before the arrival of Austin, he designed churches for the industrial towns of Lancashire, one of the largest being St James, Poolstock (1863–66). The rebuilding of St Peter's Church, Bolton (1867–71) with its northwest tower rising to 180 feet (55 m), (Note: This is the highest church tower in Lancashire.) is considered by Brandwood et al. to be "Paley's other great independent church project". Hartwell et al. refer to it as a "formidable new church".

Secular commissions during this period included the restoration of the medieval tower at Dalton Castle (1859), and buildings for the Lancaster Carriage and Wagon Works (1864–65). The largest building designed by Paley, and indeed by the practice, was the Royal Albert Asylum (later renamed the Royal Albert Hospital which is currently named Jamea Al Kauthar Islamic College) in Lancaster (1868–73); it was in Gothic Revival style, and had an E-shaped plan. It has a central French-type tower, with a steeply pitched pyramidal roof flanked by pinnacles. Paley designed stations for the Furness Railway, starting with the Strand Station in Barrow (1863); he probably also designed the station at Grange-over-Sands (1866). Overlooking the latter town he designed the Grange Hotel (1866).

=== Paley and Austin ===
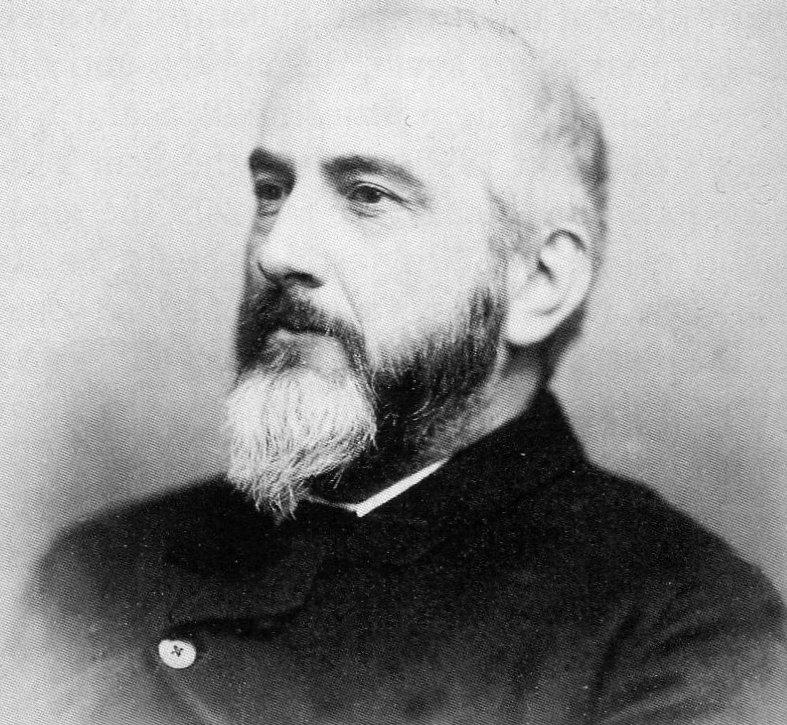
Hubert Austin

On 28 January 1867 Hubert Austin joined Paley in the practice as a partner. He was the half-brother of Thomas Austin, who had been a pupil of Sharpe. Hubert Austin had worked for three years in the office of George Gilbert Scott, and before he joined the Lancaster practice had designed Christ Church, Ashford, Kent (1855–56). Following his arrival, the work of the practice continued much as before, with both ecclesiastical and secular commissions.

==== Ecclesiastical works ====
Two early large churches in industrial areas in Lancashire were built in 1869–71: St Chad, Kirkby, and St John the Evangelist, Cheetham. Pollard describes St Chad as one of the partnership's "most powerful churches", Brandwood et al. consider that St John the Evangelist is the practice's "most important church in Manchester. These were followed by the rebuilding, other than the tower, of St Mary, Leigh (1871–73), in which the Perpendicular style, generally unfashionable at the time, was used throughout. Similarly the body of All Saints' Church, Daresbury (1870–72) was rebuilt in Perpendicular style. Meanwhile the practice was designing new churches or rebuilding old churches for villages in the countryside. Some of these were small, others larger and more impressive, such as St Peter, Finsthwaite (1873–74) and St Peter, Scorton (1878–79). In 1872–73 the partners built their only new church in Wales, St Mary, Betws-y-Coed. This was followed by an estate church, St John the Evangelist (1882–84) at Walton, south of Warrington, and by the rebuilding of the old parish church of St Mary (1884–85) at Dalton-in-Furness.

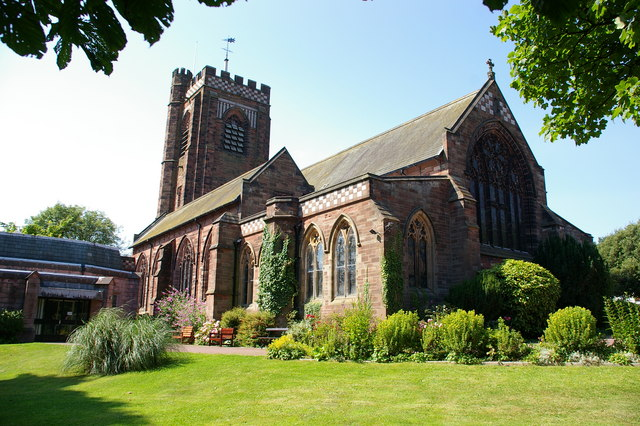
St Mary's Church, Dalton-in-Furness, (1884–85) a new church with chequerwork decoration

They also designed about 23 urban churches of varying sizes and styles. Most were in the industrial towns of Lancashire, except for St John the Evangelist, Greenock (1877–78) in Scotland, a mission chapel in Scarborough, North Yorkshire (1885), and St Barnabas (1884–85) in the railway town of Crewe, Cheshire. Notable among the Lancashire urban churches are St Matthew and St James, Mossley Hill, Liverpool (1870–75), described by Pollard as "one of the best Victorian churches in Liverpool, St Michael and All Angels, Howe Bridge, Atherton (1875–77), considered by Pollard to be one of Paley and Austin's "most stimulating churches", and St John the Baptist, also in Atherton (1878–79), of which Pollard says "The whole is monumental, one of Paley and Austin's best", with a tower that is "magnificently mighty". In Astley Bridge, Bolton, they built two churches, which are described by Hartwell et al. as being "remarkable"; these were All Souls (1878–81), which is now redundant, and St Saviour (1882–85), which was demolished in 1975. St James, Daisy Hill, Westhoughton (1879–81) is considered by Hartwell et al. as "a masterly performance for relatively little cash", and St Peter, Westleigh Leigh (1879–81) is described by Pollard as one of Paley and Austin's "most radical and thrilling churches". Meanwhile, in rapidly growing Barrow, they had built four smaller churches to a common design, each dedicated to one of the Four Evangelists. In 1884 the partnership submitted plans for a new Anglican cathedral in Liverpool. Their plan was placed in the top twelve, but failed to make the next round of the competition. In the event the project was abandoned in 1888, the cathedral being built later and on a different site.

==== Secular works ====
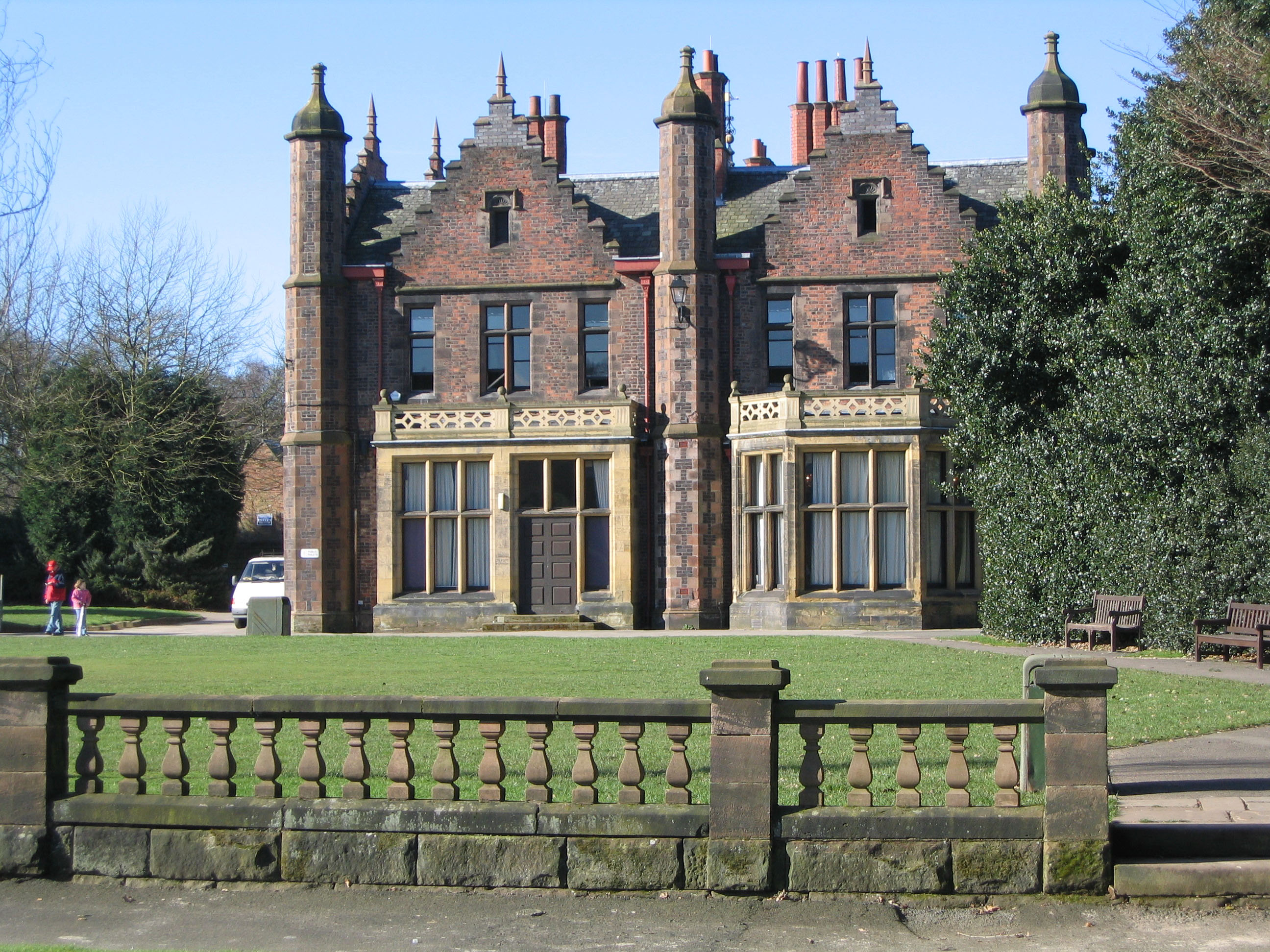
Walton Hall, near Warrington, to which Paley and Austin made alterations in 1870

Meanwhile, the town of Barrow was continuing to grow, and this resulted in many commissions for the practice. In order to deal with this they opened a sub-office in the town, run by John Harrison (1837–96), which continued to exist until the late 1880s. The first major commission in the town was to design a flax and jute mill for James Ramsden (1870–72). Other secular buildings included banks, cemetery buildings (including a large gateway), ten large tenement blocks, schools, villas, meeting halls, and the School of Art. For the Furness Railway they designed stations, goods sheds, workers' cottages and, probably, the circular water tower at Seascale. The partners were also involved with work at large country houses. The most important commission was to build a new wing at Holker Hall in 1871–75 to replace a wing severely damaged by fire; this was the largest project undertaken by the partners. (Note: Holker Hall was the seat of William Cavendish, by then the 7th Duke of Devonshire.) The next major country house commission was the restoration of Hoghton Tower (1876–78) for Sir Henry de Hoghton. Other work on country houses included building Sedgwick House (1868–69), adding an extension to Leighton Hall (1870), making extensions to Walton Hall (1870), Underley Hall (1872), Capernwray Hall (1875–76), and Whittington Hall (1887). New houses included Oak Lea for Henry Schneider (1874, since demolished), Witherslack Hall (1874), and Hampsfield House (1880–82). Their last major work on a country house was the remodelling of Thurland Castle (1879–85) following severe damage by fire. The practice continued to design new schools, and in the 1870s they began to design new buildings for Sedbergh School, creating an association with the school that was to produce commissions throughout the remaining life of the practice.

=== Paley, Austin and Paley ===
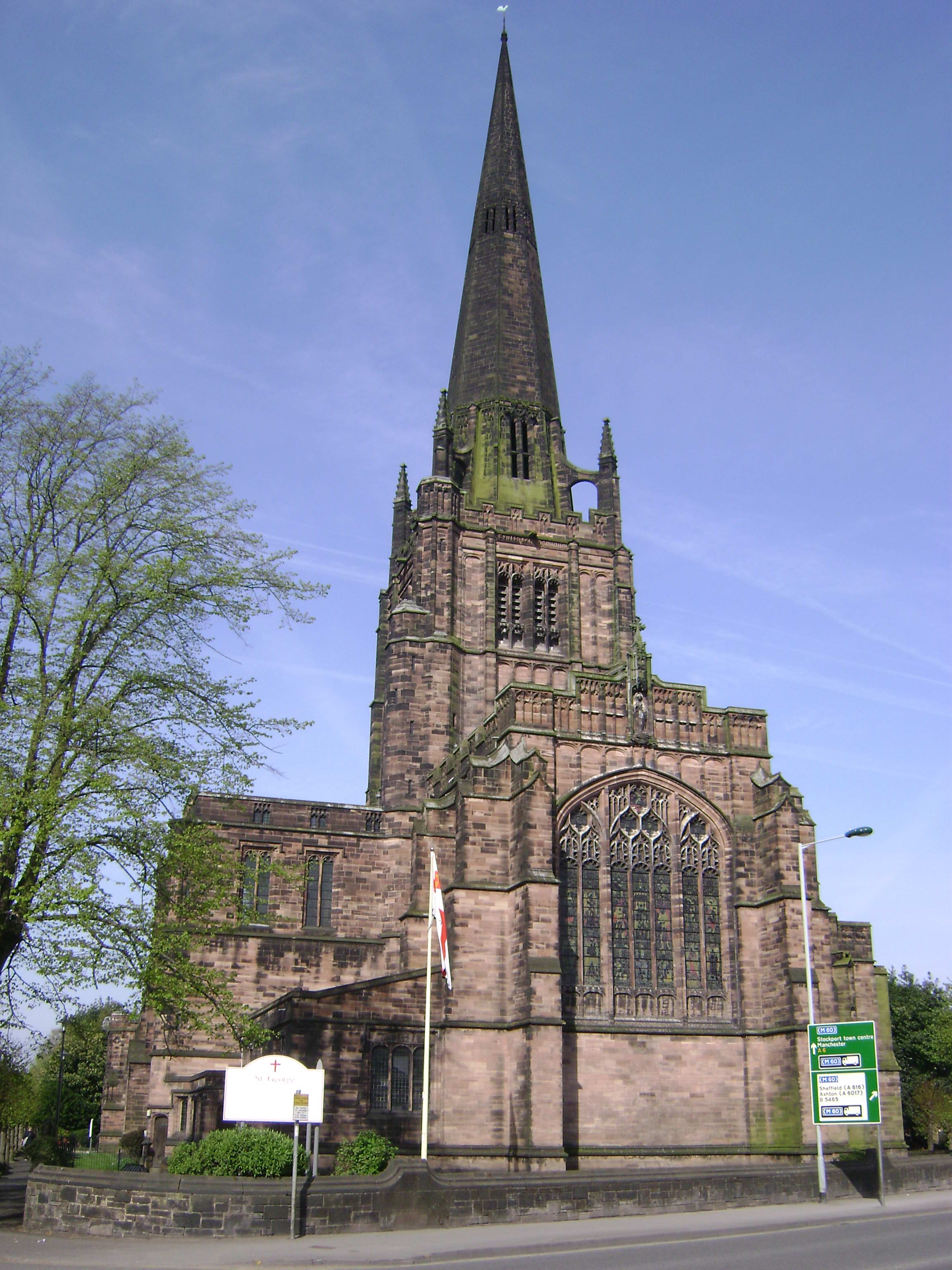
St George's Church, Heaviley, Stockport, (1892–97) considered to be Hubert Austin's finest church

In 1886 Edward Paley's son, Henry (who was and is usually known as Harry), became a partner in the practice, which continued to work much as before, with ecclesiastical and secular commissions. New churches were built in villages and towns, and older churches were restored or altered. The first new country church resulting from the partnership was the Church of the Good Shepherd, Tatham (1888–89). Brandwood et al. describe the 1890s as "something of a golden decade for the firm's country churches". The first of these was St Bartholomew, Barbon (1892–93), mainly Perpendicular in style, but with some rounded arches, followed by St Peter, Field Broughton (1892–94), also in Perpendicular style. Smaller churches were St Mary, Borwick (1894–96) (Perpendicular again), and a mission church seating 150 at Sunderland Point (1894). The 1890s was also a prolific period for new town churches but, before the start of that decade, the firm had designed St Mary, Ince-in-Makerfield (1887, demolished 1974), St John, Birkdale (1899–90), and St John, Cloughfold, in Rawtenstall (1899–90, now redundant). Major town churches of the first half of the 1890s include St John, Crawshawbooth (1890–92), and Christ Church, Waterloo (near Liverpool) (1891–99). During this time the partnership produced their only church in the south of England, All Saints, Hertford (1893–95). Brandwood et al. say that it is a "Perpendicular building entirely characteristic of the firm" but, being built in Runcorn sandstone from Cheshire, Pevsner considered that it was "completely alien in Herts". This period also saw the finest church design to be executed by the practice, St George, Heaviley in Stockport (1892–97), which is considered to be the solely the work of Austin. Brandwood et al. describe it as "the largest, grandest and most expensive church the practice ever built and is the masterwork of Hubert Austin". Hartwell et al. say it is "a church on a splendid scale". Another ecclesiastical project was the chapel at the Royal Albert Asylum (1886–80).

During this time much less work was carried out in the secular sphere. There were no new substantial country houses designed during this time, the largest being the "rather plain, four-square" Hampsfield House. The only major public buildings were the Storey Institute (1887–91) in Lancaster, and the Lancaster Royal Infirmary (1893–96). Work was carried out on school buildings, including extensions at Lancaster Royal Grammar School and Christ Church School, Lancaster (both 1887), and a new building for the Keswick School of Industrial Art (1893–94). Commercial buildings included shops for the Lancaster and Skerton Cooperative Society, including a large store in the middle of Lancaster.

=== Austin and Paley ===
==== 1895–1914 ====
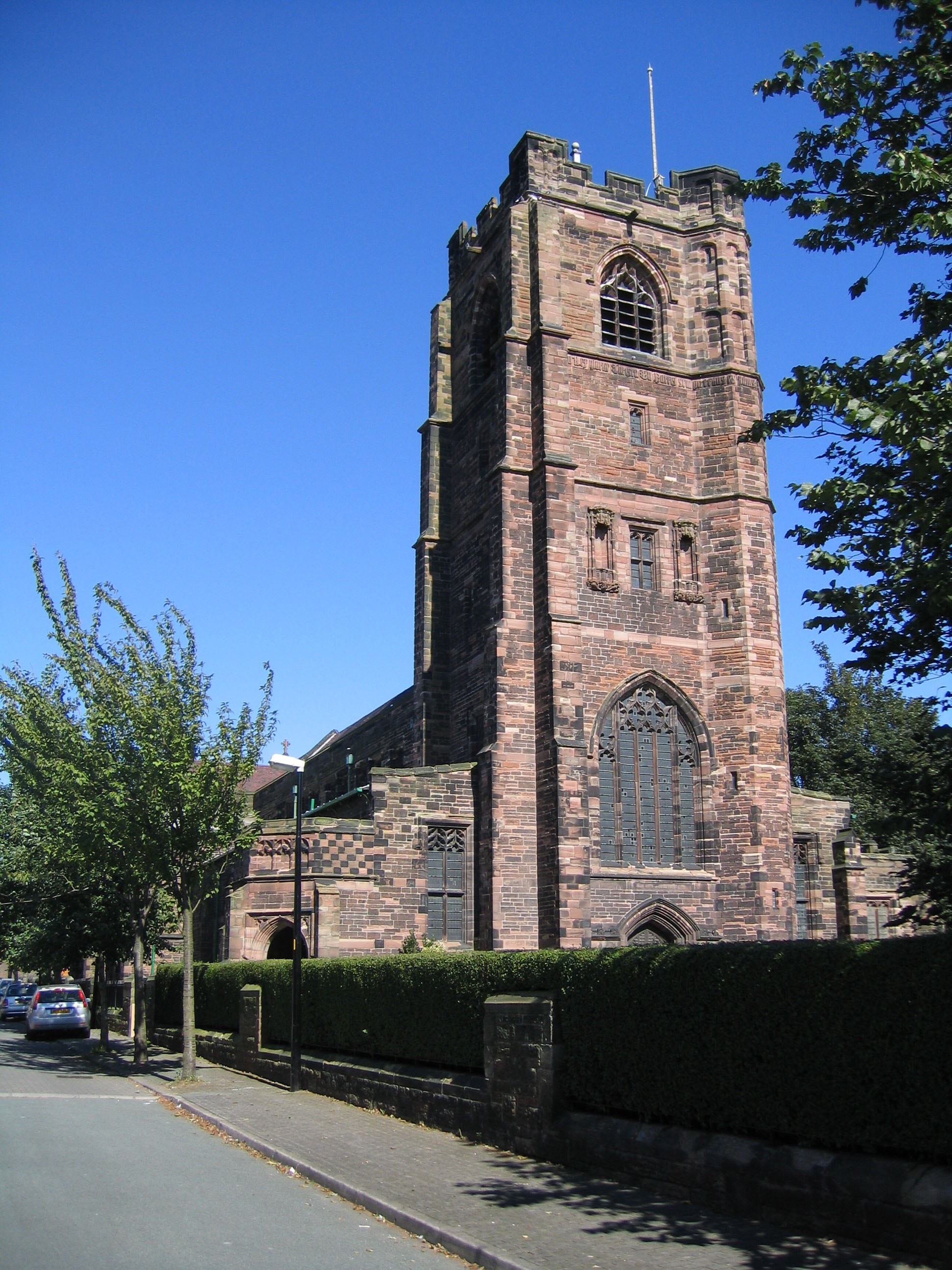
St Mary's Church, Widnes (1908–10)

Edward Paley died on 23 January 1895 at the age of 71, and the remaining partners continued the practice under the title Austin and Paley. It is not clear how much Edward Paley had been contributing to the work of the practice in his later years; it is likely that by then Austin had been "the chief creative force". The church commissions continued much as before, particularly with new churches, and also with church restorations. New country churches included St Mark, Dolphinholme (1897–98), St Luke, Slyne (1898–1900), and St John, Flookburgh (1897–1900), the last of which incorporated Romanesque features. After 1900 the practice designed All Saints, Barnacre (1905–06), St John, Ellel (1906–07), and St Mark, Natland (1909–10). There were many new town churches, including St Barnabas, Morecambe (1898–1900), St John the Divine, Sandylands (1898–1901) (also in Morecambe), St Anne, Hindsford (1898–1901 now redundant), and St Thomas, St Anne's-on-the-Sea (1899–1900). These were followed in the 20th century by new churches including St Michael, Middleton (1901–02), St Mary, Walney (1907–08), St Andrew, Starbeck, Harrogate (1909–10), and St Margaret, Halliwell, Bolton (1911–13). Brandwood et al. describe two further buildings as the partnership's "last two major urban churches". The first of these is St Michael and All Angels, Ashton-on-Ribble, Preston (1906–08). The other, described as the partners' "last great masterpiece" is St Mary, Widnes (1908–10). (Note: This is also described by Brandwood et al as "a magnificent essay in space and light, equal to, if very different from, the best churches of the time by masters such as Giles Gilbert Scott and Temple Moore".) Further ecclesiastical works were the chapels built for Sedbergh School (1895–97) and for St Bees' School (1906).

Although church work dominated the work of the practice there were also some secular commissions. There was no work on country houses during this period, nor were there any commissions for public buildings, other than an expansion of the Storey Institute (1906–08). The last public building designed by the partnership was Hornby Village Institute (1914). In the commercial field the firm designed workshops and a showroom for William Atkinson, which were among the earliest motor garages and showrooms in the provinces. The practice continued to carry out work for the Lancaster and Skerton Cooperative Society, designing numerous shops in the local area. The partners also carried out work on schools, in particular for Sedbergh School. They designed an extension to Leeds Grammar School (1904–05), Llandovery College, North Wales (1901–03), Shrewsbury School (1913–14), and extra buildings for St Bees School, Rossall School, and the Clergy Daughters' School at Casterton (1896).

==== Austin, Paley and Austin ====
Hubert Austin's eldest son, Bernard Tate (1873–1955), studied architecture in the firm, but had a disagreement with his father and left in 1902 to work as an architect for Lever Brothers. Austin's youngest son, Geoffrey Langshaw (1884–1971), also worked with the practice from 1907, and was made a junior partner in January 1914, when the practice became known as Austin, Paley and Austin. However the partnership was short-lived as Geoffrey enlisted to serve in the King's Own Royal Lancaster Regiment in February 1915. He saw active service in the First World War, leaving the army in 1919, but did not return to the practice, nor did he continue with an architectural career.

==== 1915–44 ====
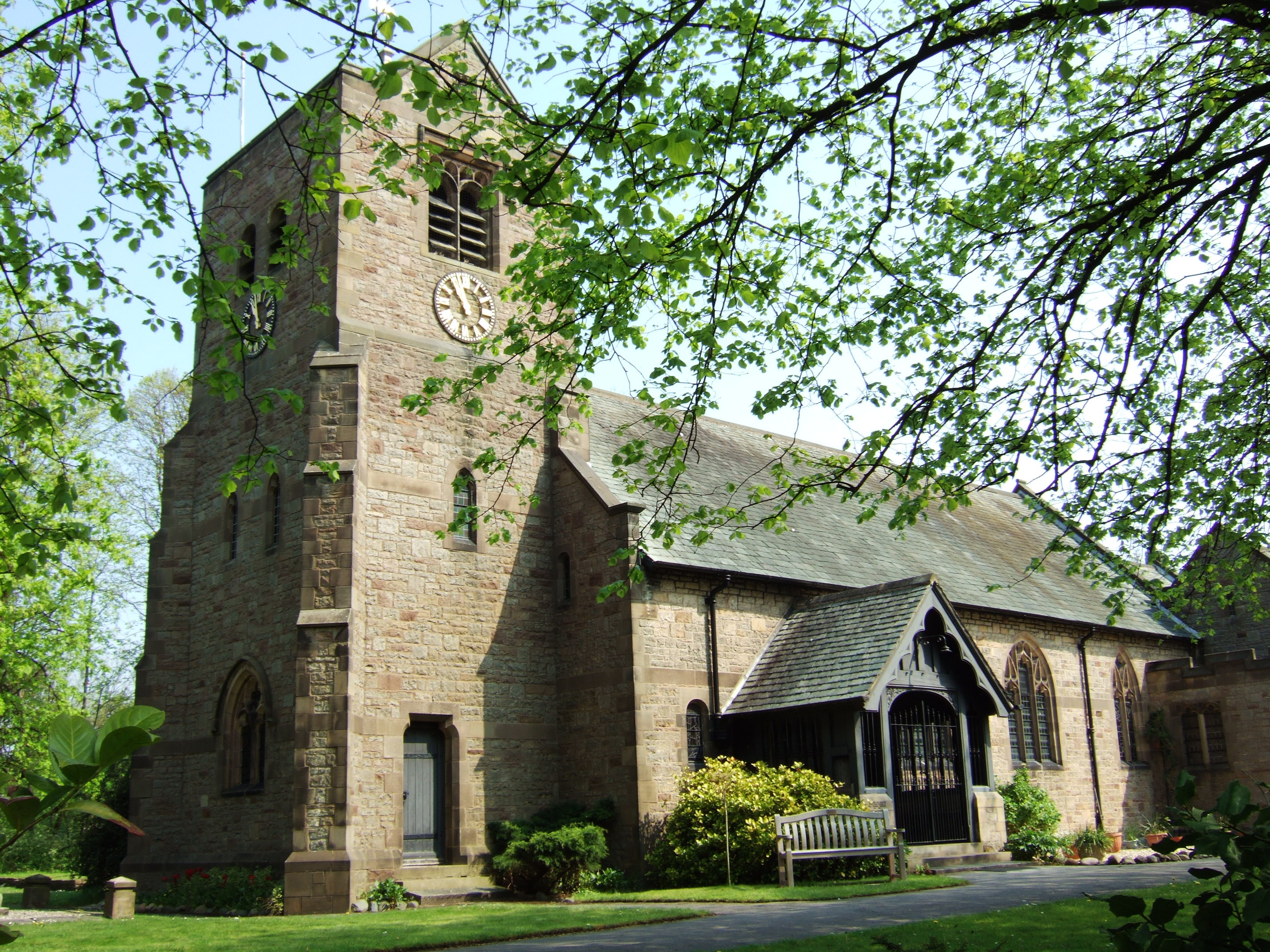
All Saints Church, Becconsall (1925–26)

Hubert Austin died on 22 March 1915 leaving Harry Paley as the sole principal, but the practice continued to be known as Austin and Paley. Helped by assistants and clerks Paley continued to work until the 1940s, but without appointing another partner. He continued to work on churches, repairing and restoring older churches, and designing new ones. His new churches include All Saints, Becconsall (1925–26), St Stephen on-the-Cliffs, Blackpool (1925–27), St Hilda, Bilsborrow (1926–27), St Luke, Orrell (1927–28 and 1938), St Stephen, Whelley (1928–30 and 1937–38), St Barbara, Earlsdon, Coventry (1930–31), St Thomas, Blackpool (1930–32), and his last church, St John, Abram (1935–37). A major source of commissions following the First World War was the design of war memorials and monuments. Two of Paley's war memorials are considered to be sufficiently notable to have been designated as Grade II listed buildings. They are both in villages in Cumbria, Beetham and Great Salkeld, both in sandstone in the form of a Celtic cross, and were constructed in or about 1919. Work continued to be carried out at Sedbergh, Giggleswick, and Leeds Grammar Schools, and on the Royal Lancaster Infirmary. The practice continued to be active until the 1940s. It is uncertain when Harry Paley retired, and it is possible that some work was carried out by his assistants after his retirement. The practice had certainly closed by 1945, when the offices were sold to Lancaster Corporation and the records of the firm were destroyed. Harry Paley died on 19 April 1946.

== Architectural styles ==
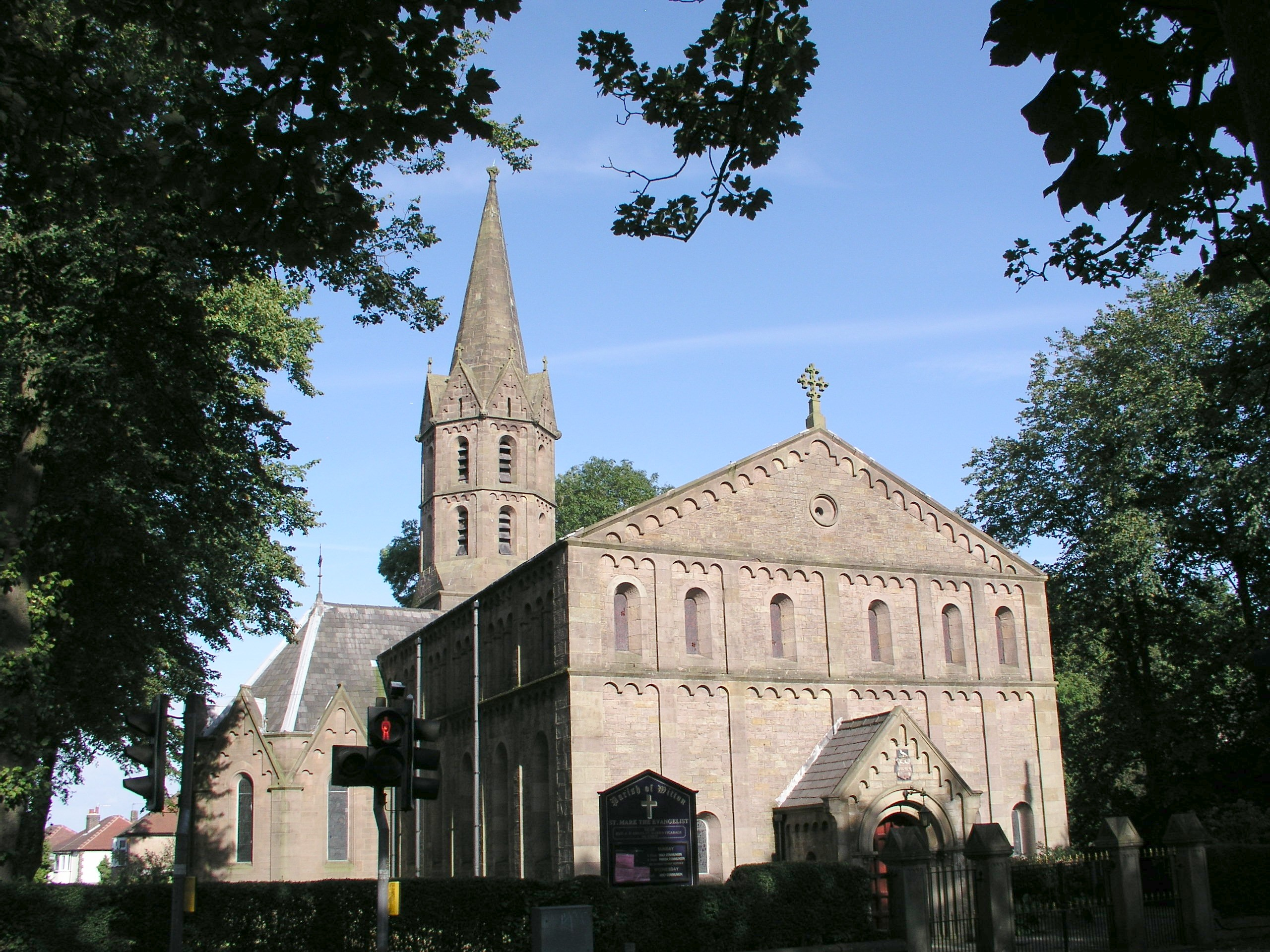
St Mark's Church, Blackburn, (1836–38) a Romanesque church by Sharpe

Sharpe's first three churches were in Romanesque style, as according to Sharpe "no style can be worked so cheap as Romanesque". He then started to include Gothic features, which often did not accurately reflect the features to be found in medieval churches, being an approximation rather than an accurate (or "correct") representation. Influenced by A. W. N. Pugin (1812–52) and the Cambridge Camden Society (later named the Ecclesiological Society), of which Sharpe was a member, he introduced more "correct" Gothic features into his designs, which he continued to use throughout the rest of his career. In 1844 he was praised by the society for his design of the new steeple at St Michael, Kirkham (1843–44), which was described as being "beautiful and correct".

Almost all of Paley's designs were in Gothic Revival style, mainly reflecting features of the 13th and early 14th centuries, with open roofs, benches for the congregation, stalls for the choir, the pulpit to the side of the entrance to the chancel, steps leading up to the chancel, and no side chapels. Most of the designs were largely in the Decorated style, although Paley did occasionally introduce 15th-century Perpendicular features, for example in his rebuilding of St Patrick, Preston Patrick (1852–53). During the 1850s Paley introduced what was to become one of his favourite features, the traceried oculus window, in Christ Church, Bacup (1854) and St James, Wrightington (1857).

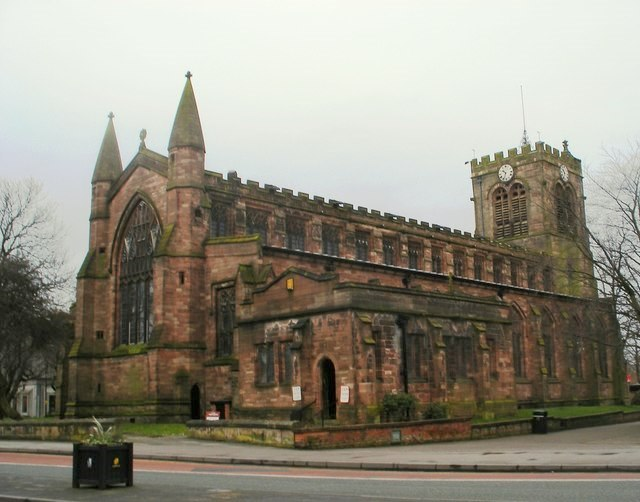
St Mary the Virgin's Church, Leigh, the body being rebuilt in Perpendicular style by Paley and Austin in 1871–73

During the Paley and Austin partnership, the architectural styles used by the practice changed and developed. In church architecture, Paley had already started to introduce Perpendicular features in some of his designs, and this trend was to continue and increase after the arrival of Austin. Throughout their partnership, the designs for churches were mainly in Gothic Revival style. After the arrival of Austin, there was much greater use of Perpendicular features. Brandwood et al. see the practice as national pioneers in this trend, saying "the firm can be seen as a true pioneer in the rehabilitation of Perpendicular architecture after its ecclesiological exile for a quarter of a century". Early examples of what the authors consider to be part of what they call "the Perpendicular revival in the North" are the rebuilding of the bodies of St Mary, Leigh, (1871–73) and All Saints, Daresbury (1870–72). The Perpendicular "would become the stock-in-trade style for some of the most admired buildings as the years rolled on". However they did continue to use features from the Early English and Decorated styles, sometimes together in the same church, as in New St Leonard, Langho. Away from the Gothic Revival style, Norman or Norman transitional features were occasionally used, as in St Mary, Betws-y-Coed (1872–73), and St Peter, Finsthwaite (1873–74).

Brandwood et al identify two other, potentially incompatible, stylistic changes in the firm's designs during this period. The first is what they describe as "a greater muscularity ...at times accompanied by continental overtones". Examples are in the restoration of the tower of St Peter, Heversham, (1868–70) and in the new church of St Mary, Walton, Cumbria (1869–70). The other stylistic factor was the use of "gentler, less ornate" motifs taken from the Aesthetic Movement, or motifs that could "pass muster as proto-Arts & Crafts work". Features "verging on Art Nouveau" are present in window tracery in All Saints, St Helens, and on the gate-piers outside St George, Heaviley. What became a "favourite feature" for Austin and Paley were carved inscriptions, usually black, sometimes in Latin and sometimes in English; examples can be in St John, Crawshawbooth, and Christ Church, Waterloo (both in Merseyside).

In their secular commissions the practice used a variety of styles. Their new wing at Holker Hall was in Elizabethan style, as were the additions to Underley Hall. Witherslack Hall has Jacobean detailing, while other country houses, such as Sedgwick House, incorporate Gothic features. Thurland Castle has features of both Elizabethan and late Gothic styles. Motifs taken from the Aesthetic Movement can be found in both the exterior and the interior of their new wing at Holker Hall, and from the Arts and Crafts Movement in the interior of Thurland Castle.

== Patrons ==
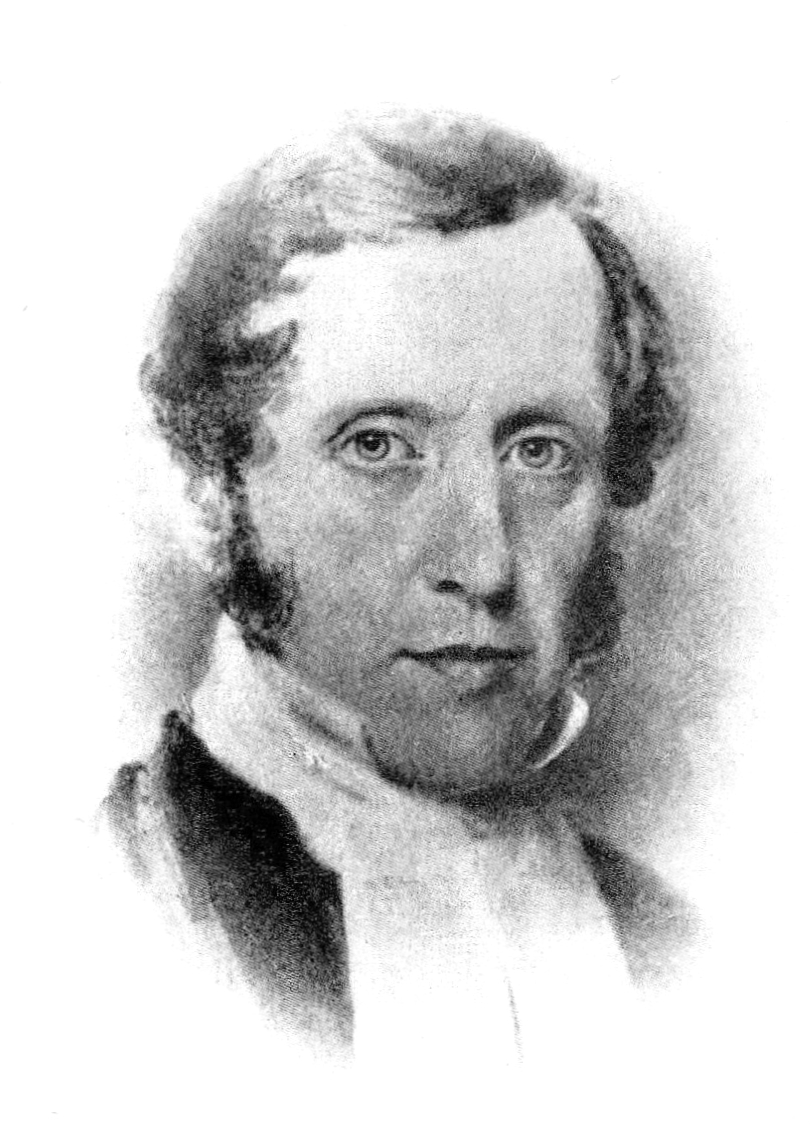
Revd John William Whittaker, Sharpe's early patron

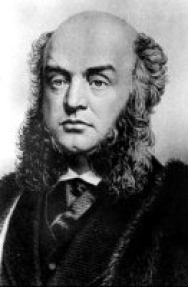
Sir James Ramsden, Barrow-in-Furness businessman and patron of the practice

Sharpe's earliest commissions were promoted by his older cousin Revd J. W. Whitaker, vicar of Blackburn. Whittaker had connections with major figures in the Church of England and members of the aristocracy. Sharpe's work came to the notice of the Bishop of Chester, Rt Rev John Bird Sumner, whose diocese at that time included Lancashire as well as Cheshire. He was a member of the Church Building Commission, and it is likely that he played a part in Sharpe's involvement in designing Commissioners' Churches. Family connections led to an association with the Greenall family, brewers in Warrington, which possibly led to the commission for the series of churches along the Weaver Navigation. Sharpe had hoped to gain commissions from the Earl of Derby, but was successful only in his design for St Mary, Knowsley. The relationship the practice developed with the major entrepreneurs in Barrow-in-Furness, James Ramsden, and Henry Schneider, resulted in the many commissions for buildings in the town and for the Furness Railway.

== Practice organisation and personalities ==
As the office records have been destroyed there is no detailed account of how the office was run, or how the partners related to each other in business matters. Sharpe was a man of many interests and talents. In addition to him being an entrepreneur, establishing a practice that lasted for more than 100 years, he was a railway engineer and developer, a public figure who pioneered sanitary reform in Lancaster. He was also an accomplished sportsman and musician. Edward Paley also took an active part in the civil life of Lancaster, while Hubert Austin had a more retiring personality, concentrating more on his work in the practice and with his family. By the time Harry Paley came to run the practice alone there was less work available. As he was relatively comfortable financially, he was also able to take part in the life of the town and in his sporting interests.

All the principals were Anglicans, and most of the church commissions came from the Church of England. Sharpe, in particular, had low church sympathies, and most of the commissions throughout the life of the practice were for the churches of low church or middle-of the-road patrons. This was consistent with the state of Anglicanism generally in Lancashire, possibly a reaction against the strong presence of Catholicism in the county. Henry Austin was a keen churchman, and was a churchwarden for many years. Nevertheless, the practice did design churches and other buildings for Catholics, Congregationalists and Presbyterians.

== Appraisal ==
The firm was a "provincial architectural practice" in the strict use of the term; sited as it was in a town some distance from any major city. Its output was almost entirely in North West England, particularly in Lancashire and in the southern part of what is now Cumbria. Nevertheless, the practice did achieve national recognition, especially in the later part of the 19th century, and in particular for its churches. A contemporary opinion of the practice was given by the German architect and critic Hermann Muthesius who was present in England between 1896 and 1904. He commented on English architecture and architects, and in his book Die neuere kirchliche Baukunst in England (1901) he placed the works of Austin and Paley on a par with Bodley and Garner, James Brooks, J. D. Sedding, Norman Shaw, and George Gilbert Scott, junior. He was particularly impressed by St Peter, Lancaster, and by the village churches designed by the practice. Writing in 1969 the architectural historian Nikolaus Pevsner said "this Lancaster dynasty of architects did more work in the county, and for a time more outstanding work, than any other". (Note: The county referred to here was the historic county of Lancashire, which was then much larger than the present ceremonial county; it included parts of what are now Cumbria, Greater Manchester and Merseyside.) Referring to the late Victorian churches designed by the practice, Pevsner stated that they were "of the highest European standard of their years". Of the partners, Pevsner had highest regard for Hubert Austin, whom he called a "genius", saying that it was he "it seems, who was responsible for the firm's masterpieces". The title of the introduction to the book by Brandwood et al. entitled The Architecture of Sharpe, Paley and Austin is "A practice like no other".
