= Henry Paley =

English architect (1859–1946)

Henry Anderson Paley (1859–1946) was an English architect.

== Training and career ==
He was the fifth and last child of the Lancaster architect Edward Paley. He was educated at Castle Howard School in Lancaster, then from 1873 at Uppingham School. After leaving school in 1877, he was articled to his father's firm, Paley and Austin. In 1881 he went on to the London office of T. E. Collcutt for 18 months to broaden his experience. He returned to his father's practice in 1882 and became a partner in 1886, the firm then being known as Paley, Austin and Paley. Up to the death of Hubert Austin in 1915, he was involved in the design of 75 new churches and also in restorations and additions to other churches. After that he mainly worked alone, or with associates rather than partners, designing some more churches, and also hospitals, schools and houses.

== Personal life ==
Paley married Katherine Margaret Gossalin in 1888. Initially they lived at Dallas Court in Lancaster, then moved to the Manor House in Halton. They later moved to Escowbeck Cottage, Caton, to the northeast of Lancaster, and finally, after his father's death, moved into his house, Moorgarth, at Brookhouse, near Caton. They had one daughter, Katherine Helena, who never married.

Paley died in 1946 at his home, Moorgarth, in Caton.

== Notable works ==
=== War memorials ===
- Bowland War Memorial, Dunsop Bridge, Lancashire (1920)

== See also ==
- Sharpe, Paley and Austin
