= List of architectural works by Edmund Sharpe =

Edmund Sharpe (1809–1877) was an English architect, architectural historian, railway engineer, and sanitary reformer. Between 1832 and 1835, in receipt of a travelling fellowship, he studied architecture in Germany and southern France. He started his career as an architect in Lancashire in 1835, initially on his own, then from 1845 in partnership with Edward Paley. He mainly designed churches but also some secular buildings, including domestic properties and schools. Sharpe pioneered the use of terracotta as a structural material in church construction, designing what were known as "pot" churches. During this time he also worked on the development of railways in Northwest England, including the design of bridges and the planning of new lines. In 1851, he resigned from his architectural practice, and in 1856 he moved from Lancaster and spent the rest of his career mainly as a railway engineer, first in North Wales, then in Switzerland and southern France. He returned to England in 1866 to live in Scotforth near Lancaster, where he designed a final church near to his home.

Sharpe achieved national recognition as an architectural historian. He devised a new scheme for classifying the styles of English Gothic architecture, published books of detailed architectural drawings, and towards the end of his career organized expeditions to study and draw buildings in England and France. In 1875, he was awarded the Royal Gold Medal of the Royal Institute of British Architects. He wrote a number of articles on architecture, and was very critical of much of the restoration of medieval churches that had become a major occupation of contemporary architects.

This list contains the architectural works designed by Sharpe before Paley joined him as a partner, plus his last church.

== Key ==
| Grade | Criteria |
|---|---|
| Grade I | Buildings of exceptional interest, sometimes considered to be internationally important. |
| Grade II* | Particularly important buildings of more than special interest. |
| Grade II | Buildings of national importance and special interest. |
"—" denotes a work that is not graded.

== Works ==
| Name | Location | Photograph | Date | Notes | Grade |
|---|---|---|---|---|---|
| St Saviour's Church | Cuerden, Lancashire; 53.7197°N 2.6600°W | | 1836–37 | This was a new church in Romanesque Revival style at an estimated cost of £1,360 seating 650 people. The foundation stone was laid by Robert Townley Parker MP of Cuerdon Hall, who gave the land, and also contributed £200 towards the church. The church has a west steeple consisting of a two-stage square base, a two-stage octagonal drum, and a spire. | II |
| St Mark's Church | Blackburn, Lancashire; 53.7439°N 2.5083°W | | 1836–38 | St Mark's was a new church in Romanesque Revival style, and is one of the oldest churches in the diocese of Blackburn. It was commissioned by the Feilden family, local landowners, who gave the land and contributed to its cost of £1,700. The church provided 669 seats. The steeple is placed between the nave and the east end; it is octagonal with a small gable rising from each face, and is surmounted by a spire. Nikolaus Pevsner described it as "one of the most interesting churches of Blackburn". | II* |
| Christ Church | Chatburn, Lancashire; 53.8935°N 2.3520°W | | 1837–38 | This was a new church in Romanesque Revival style. It was founded, and partly paid for, by Dixon Robinson, steward of the Honour of Clitheroe. A local newspaper suggested at the time that it was the first church to be commenced during the reign of Queen Victoria. Its estimated cost was £950, and it provided seating for 364 people. The church has a west three-stage tower with a broach spire. | II |
| Holy Trinity Church | Howgill, Sedbergh, Cumbria; 54.3495°N 2.5650°W | | 1837–38 | Holy Trinity is a small simple church in Early English style with lancet windows. The land was given by Stephen Sedgwick. The church cost £470, and it had seating for 250 people. Its plan consists of a nave and a short chancel, with a bellcote on the west gable. The church replaced a chapel on a different site nearby. | II |
| St John the Evangelist | Cowgill, Cumbria; 54.2776°N 2.3762°W | | 1837–38 | This is a small simple church in Early English style with lancet windows. At the west end is a bellcote with wooden louvres and a steep pyramidal roof surmounted by a weathervane. The foundation stone was laid by Adam Sedgwick, Professor of Geology at Cambridge University. | II |
| Christ Church | Walmsley, Bolton, Greater Manchester; 53.6236°N 2.4389°W | | 1837–39 | Christ Church was built to replace a chapel of ease. It cost £3,557, and provided seating for 512 people. The church is in Early English style with lancet windows, a six-bay nave with aisles, a shallow chancel, and a west tower with large pinnacles; it was the first substantial church by Sharpe to be built with aisles. Inside, the arcades are carried on monolithic piers 16 feet (4.9 m) high carved into four shafts. | II |
| Holy Trinity Church | Blackburn, Lancashire; 53.7511°N 2.4746°W | | 1837–45 | This was a large Commissioners' Church, costing £5,019, and seating 1,626 people. It was the largest church to be designed by Sharpe, and one of few by him to include transepts. The tower was not completed until 1855 because of lack of funds, and the intended tall spire was never built. The church was closed in 1981 and it is now under the care of the Churches Conservation Trust. | II |
| Holy Trinity Church | Bickerton, Cheshire; 53.0769°N 2.7327°W | | 1838–39 | Holy Trinity was originally a chapel of ease, and was constructed in red sandstone with a slate roof. The land was given by Sir Philip Grey Egerton. The church cost £700, and provided seating for 268 people. As initially built it consisted of a nave and bellcote. Later it became a parish church, and it was extended in 1911. | II |
| St George's Church | Stalybridge, Greater Manchester; 53.4874°N 2.0579°W | | 1838–40 | St George's was a Commissioners' church built to replace a chapel of ease on a different site nearby. It cost £4,012, and had seating for 1,022 people. The plan of the church consists of seven-bay nave with north and south aisles, and a small single-bay chancel. It has a west tower in three stages, with corner buttresses rising to pinnacles. The lancet windows contain Geometrical tracery. | II |
| St John the Evangelist's Church | Dukinfield, Greater Manchester; 53.4771°N 2.0726°W | | 1838–41 | This was a Commissioners' church costing £3,299 that provided seating for 1,234 people. It is in Early English style with paired lancet windows. The plan of the church consists of a five-bay nave, north and south aisles, and a short single-bay chancel. The west tower is in four stages, and has a coped parapet with pinnacles. | II |
| All Saints Chapel | Marthall, Cheshire; 53.2779°N 2.3021°W | | c. 1839 | This is a small red-brick chapel in Romanesque Revival style, with four round-headed windows on each side. It was built by Wilbraham Egerton of Tatton Park on his land for his tenants. | — |
| St John the Baptist's Church | Bretherton, Chorley, Lancashire; 53.6777°N 2.7951°W | | 1839–40 | St John's was a Commissioners' church costing £1,058, with 400 seats, and had a five-bay nave. At the west end is a tower, its lowest stage being open on three sides. The buttresses rise to crocketed pinnacles, between which is a stepped parapet. On top of the tower is a recessed slim octagonal spire. | II |
| St Paul's Church | Farington, Lancashire; 53.7199°N 2.7012°W | | 1839–40 | This was a Commissioners' Church costing £1,400, and seating 479 people. It is built in brick with stone dressings, and has Romanesque features. At the northwest of the church is a four-stage tower, with angle buttresse rising to pinnacles. The doorways and windows in the tower all have round heads. | II |
| Christ Church | Glasson, Lancashire; 53.9965°N 2.8426°W | | 1839–40 | Christ Church was a new church with a simple design consisting of a three-bay nave and a short chancel with lancet windows and a bellcote. The chancel was extended in 1932 by Austin and Paley. | II |
| St Peter's Church | Mawdesley, Chorley, Lancashire; 53.6236°N 2.7732°W | | 1839–40 | This was a new church in mixed Gothic style. The land was given by Sir Thomas D. Hesketh, its estimated cost was £950, and it provided 400 seats. As built, it had a five-bay nave, with a west tower, which was partly embraced by the nave. The tower has a thin recessed spire. Originally its bottom stage was open on three sides, but these have been filled in to incorporate windows and a west door. | II |
| Holy Trinity Church | Wray, Lancashire; 54.1025°N 2.6074°W | | 1839–40 | Holy Trinity was a new church consisting of a three-bay nave with a short chancel. The side windows are lancets, and it has a double bellcote. The church cost £2,021 and, although it was completed in 1840, it was not consecrated until the following year. | — |
| St Catharine's Church | Scholes, Wigan, Greater Manchester; 53.5463°N 2.6169°W | | 1839–41 | This was a Commissioners' Church costing £3,180, which is built in local sandstone. It is in Early English style, and consists of a six-bay nave, north and south aisles, a south vestry, and a short chancel. At the west end is a tower with an octagonal bell stage and an octagonal spire with two tiers of lucarnes. | II |
| St Peter's Church | Stainforth, North Yorkshire; 54.1025°N 2.6074°W | | 1839–42 | St Peter's was a new church in Perpendicular style. It consists of a single chamber of four bays, with no aisles or clerestory but with, unusually for Sharpe, a deep chancel. It has a west tower, and a five-light west window containing stained glass designed by William Wailes. | II |
| County Lunatic Asylum (later Lancaster Moor Hospital) | Lancaster, Lancashire; 54.0470°N 2.7766°W | | 1839–45 | Sharpe added five new wings to the existing building. Three of the wings (built in 1839) have been demolished; the other two (built in 1845 in Classical style), together with the original block, have been converted into flats. | II* |
| Capernwray Chapel | Over Kellet, Lancaster, Lancashire; 54.1440°N 2.7029°W | | 1840 | This was a private chapel for the Marton family of Capernwray Hall. It originally consisted of a four-bay nave, and a two-bay chancel at a lower level. The windows are lancets. The chapel provided seating for 100 people, and contained a west gallery, which acted as the family pew. As of 2013 it is used by the Evangelical Fellowship. | II |
| Union Workhouse | Lancaster, Lancashire | — | 1840–41 | Extensions were added, including a porter's lodge and lodgings for vagrants. | — |
| St James' Church | Briercliffe, Burnley, Lancashire; 53.8107°N 2.2028°W | | 1840–41 | St James' is a small church in Early English style, built on land given by the Duke of Buccleuch. It cost £1,300, and provided seating for 515 people. The church consists of a nave, a short chancel, and a west tower. The tower has an octagonal bell stage, and a short octagonal spire. | II |
| St Thomas' Church | Lancaster, Lancashire; 54.0461°N 2.7994°W | — | 1840–41 | This was a new church in Early English style. The land was given by George Marton of Capernwray Hall, and Queen Victoria gave £150 towards its cost. The church was intended to seat £1,100. It consisted of a six-bay nave with aisles, and a two-bay chancel. According to Hartwell and Pevsner it has "a grand approach up steps with imposing gatepiers". | II |
| Holy Trinity Church | Morecambe, Lancashire; 54.0746°N 2.8575°W | | 1840–41 | Holy Trinity was a new church replacing a chapel of ease, designed in 13th-century style. It cost £1,288 and, as originally built, provided seating for 498 people. It has a west three-stage tower with a gabled parapet and corner pinnacles. | II |
| Christ Church | Weston Point, Runcorn, Cheshire; 53.2689°N 2.5459°W | | 1841 | This was one of the churches built for the Trustees of the River Weaver Navigation Company. It is constructed in sandstone, and is in Geometric style. The plan of the church consists of a four-bay nave, a single-bay chancel, single-bay transepts, and a small southwest porch. At the west end is a tower with a broach spire. The church was declared redundant in 1995. | II |
| Lancaster Castle | Lancaster, Lancashire; 54.04981°N 2.80562°W | | 1841 | Sharpe held the appointment of Architect and Superintendent of Works for the castle. In 1841 he carried out heating and ventilating work. | I |
| St Bridget's Church | Calder Bridge, Beckermet, Cumbria; 54.4407°N 3.4790°W | | 1841–42 | St Bridget's was built to replace a medieval church on a different site. It was paid for by Thomas Irwin of Calder Abbey, and cost under £1,900. The church is constructed in sandstone, and is in Early English style. It has a cruciform plan, with a west tower, a three-bay nave, long transepts, and a short chancel with a north vestry, | II |
| Holy Trinity | Northwich, Cheshire; 53.2577°N 2.5188°W | — | 1841–42 | This is the largest of the churches built for the Trustees of the River Weaver Navigation Company. Its architectural style is Geometrical. The plan of the church consists of an aisleless six-bay nave, and a small narrow single-bay chancel. At the west end is a tower with a broach spire. | II |
| Christ Church | Barnton, Cheshire; 53.2689°N 2.5459°W | | 1841–42 | Christ Church was built for the Trustees of the River Weaver Navigation Company. Although there is some doubt, the design has been attributed to Sharpe. Its plan consists of an eight-bay nave and chancel in one range, a south porch, and a south chapel containing the organ. At the west end is a double bellcote, and the windows are lancets. | II |
| Lancaster Moor Hospital Chapel | Lancaster, Lancashire; 54.0467°N 2.7766°W | | 1842 | The chapel was built to the south of what was then the County Lunatic Asylum. It has since been converted into flats. | — |
| St Wilfrid's Church | Davenham, Cheshire; 53.2372°N 2.5060°W | | 1842–44 | The body of the church was replaced in Decorated style in 1842–44 and the steeple was repaired at an estimated cost of £2,150. The nave was lengthened by one bay, it was heightened and widened, and three galleries were inserted. The accommodation was increased from 601 to 910. In 1851–57 the steeple was rebuilt, probably to plans previously prepared by Sharpe. | II* |
| St Stephen and All Martyrs' Church | Lever Bridge, Bolton, Greater Manchester; 53.5722°N 2.4051°W | | 1842–44 | This was the first church to be built entirely in terracotta (and known as a "pot church"); the terracotta was made by a firm owned by John Fletcher, Sharpe's brother in law. It cost £2,600 and provided 471 seats. The church has a cruciform plan with a nave, west porch, transepts, a shallow chancel and a vestry. The spire was dismantled in 1937 because it had become unsafe. | II* |
| Holy Trinity Sunday School | Blackburn, Lancashire | — | 1843 | The Sunday School was built in association with Holy Trinity Church, being attached to its east end. It was completed before the church, and opened in 1843. | — |
| Cockerham Vicarage | Cockerham, Lancashire; 53.9641°N 2.8180°W | — | 1843 | The vicarage was built for Revd John Dodson. It is in Tudor style, and has prominent gables and chimneys. It since been used as a nursing home. | II |
| Grand Theatre | Lancaster, Lancashire; 54.0502°N 2.7967°W | | 1843 | The theatre opened as "The Theatre, Lancaster" in 1782. It was bought by Sharpe for £500, and altered by him at a cost of £680. It was re-opened as "The Music Hall" in 1843. In addition to being a theatre, it housed a museum for the Literary, Scientific and Natural History Society. There have been subsequent alterations and it is still an active theatre. | II |
| St Michael's Church | Kirkham, Lancashire; 53.7844°N 2.8711°W | | 1843–44 | Sharpe added the steeple, which is 150 feet (46 m) high, to the body of the church that was built in 1822. It is constructed in Longridge stone, and is in Decorated style. The foundation stone for the steeple was laid by Thomas Clifton of Lytham Hall. The authors of the Buildings of England series consider it to be "perhaps the finest work" of Sharpe. | II* |
| St Mary's Church | Knowsley, Merseyside; 53.4562°N 2.8528°W | | 1843–44 | This was a new church designed for the 13th Earl of Derby at a cost of about £20,000. It is constructed in sandstone, and is mainly in Early English style. Sharpe designed the five-bay nave with a clerestory, the aisles, the five-bay chancel, and the west tower with its broach spire. | II |
| Christ Church | Winsford, Cheshire | — | 1843–44 | Christ Church was a new church built for the Trustees of the River Weaver Navigation Company, and provided about 420 seats. It was in Geometrical style, and had a broach spire. The church was demolished in 1882 because of subsidence due to salt mining. | — |
| Wyreside Hall | Dolphinholme, Lancashire; 53.9693°N 2.7365°W | | 1843–44 | Wyreside Hall is a country house dating from the 18th century. The front was remodelled by Sharpe in Neoclassical style. The hall has since been divided into apartments. | II |
| St Stephen's Vicarage | Lever Bridge, Bolton, Greater Manchester | — | 1844 | The vicarage was built in association with St Stephen's Church | — |
| Governor's House | Knutsford, Cheshire; 53.3015°N 2.3737°W | — | 1844 | The house was built for the governor of Knutsford Gaol, and has been used since as a Tourist Information Centre. It is a red brick building in Georgian style. | II |
| Fenton House | Lancaster, Lancashire | — | c. 1844 | This was a new house built by Sharpe for himself as a residence and office. It was largely demolished in 2005, retaining its façade. | — |
| Capernwray Hall | Over Kellet, Lancaster, Lancashire; 54.1436°N 2.6959°W | | 1844–48 | Capernwray Hall was built for the Marton family in 1805. Sharpe incorporated the core of the older house and added a large west wing, a gateway with a tower above, and a stable and service block. The additions are in Perpendicular style, with battlements and pinnacles. The house has since been used as a Christian centre. | II* |
| St George's Church | Preston, Lancashire; 53.7593°N 2.7026°W | — | 1845 | Sharpe added the chancel, and Minton tiles were laid in the interior. | II* |
| St Cuthbert's Church | Redmarshall, County Durham; 54.5844°N 1.4040°W | | 1845 | The church dates from the 13th century and contains much Norman architecture. Sharpe's restoration included replacing the former sash windows in the nave and chapel with mullioned windows in Perpendicular style. The rector of the church was Revd Thomas Austin, whose son, also Thomas, had been a pupil of Sharpe. | I |
| Rectory | Redmarshall, County Durham; 54.5846°N 1.4037°W | — | 1845 | The rectory was built for the Revd Thomas Austin at the same time as Sharpe's restoration of the church. It replaced an earlier building, and reused some of its material. The rectory cost £1,326, of which £600 came from Queen Anne's Bounty. | II |
| Holy Trinity Church | Rusholme, Manchester, Greater Manchester; 53.4501°N 2.2254°W | | 1845–46 | This is the second of Sharpe's "pot" churches, built for Thomas Carrill Worsley of Platt Hall; it is constructed largely of terracotta. The church cost £4,000, and could seat between 650 and 700 people. Its plan consists of a five-bay nave with a clerestory, a southwest steeple, north and south aisles, a two-bay chancel, a west porch, and a south porch contained in the tower. The spire was built from inferior material, and had to be rebuilt in 1912. | II* |
| St Paul's Church | Scotforth, Lancaster, Lancashire; 54.0336°N 2.7955°W | | 1874–76 | Sharpe returned from retirement as a railway engineer to live in Scotforth, and designed this church near to his home. He returned to Romanesque Revival style for its design, and to the use of terracotta in its construction. The church was built mainly in brick, with terracotta for the dressings. Memorials to Sharpe and to his wife are in the chancel. | II |
| Green Ayre railway station | Lancaster, Lancashire; 54.0528°N 2.7973°W | — | Undated | The railway station was built for the Morecambe Harbour and Railway Company. It was demolished in 1976. | — |

== See also ==
- Sharpe, Paley and Austin
- List of works by Sharpe and Paley
