= St Stephen and All Martyrs' Church, Lever Bridge =

Terracotta church in Bolton, Greater Manchester

Coordinates: 53.5722°N 2.4051°W

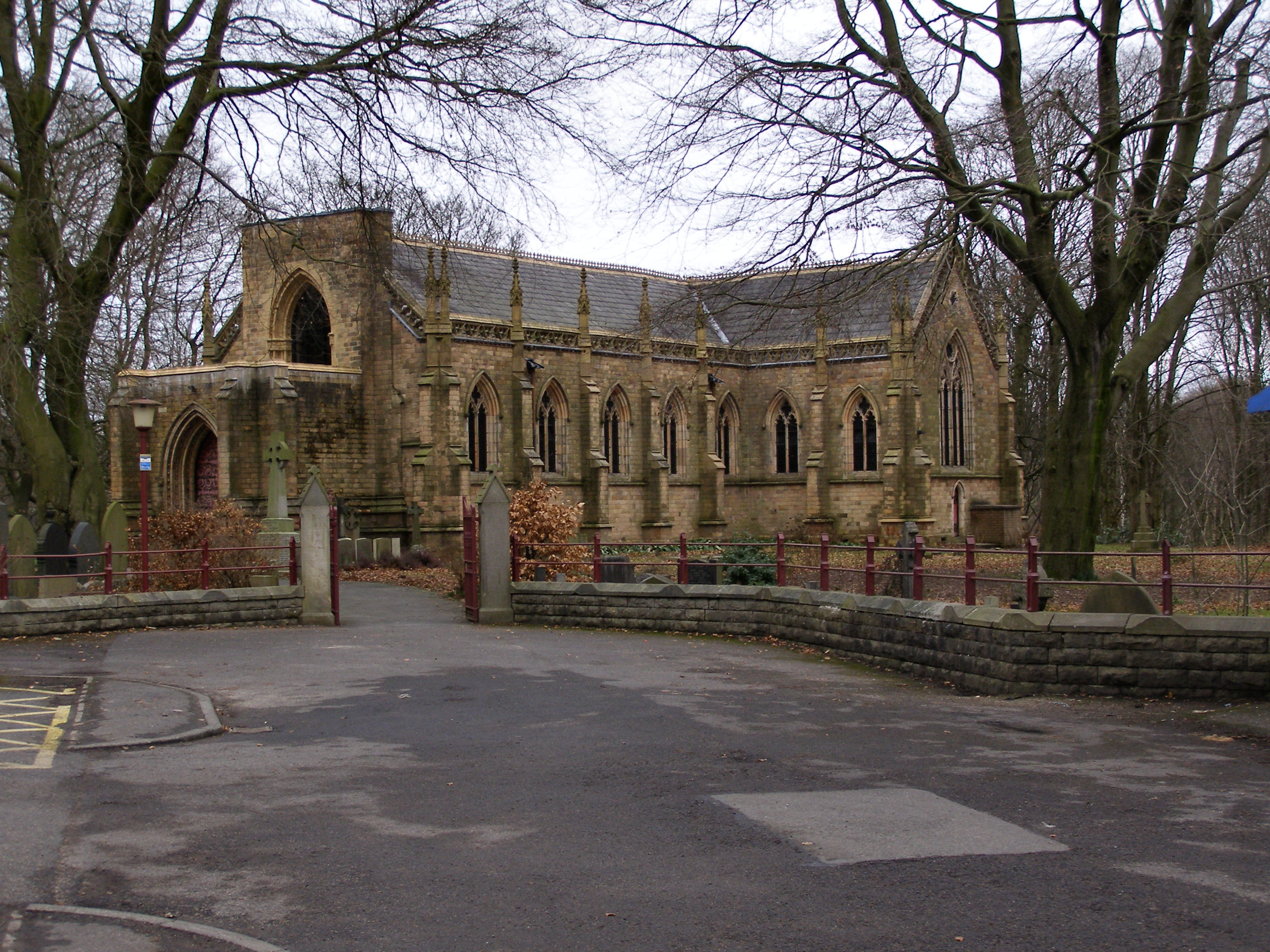
- The church from the southwest

- Location in Greater Manchester
- OS grid reference: SD 732,084
- Location: Radcliffe Rd, Darcy Lever, Bolton, Greater Manchester
- Country: England
- Denomination: Anglican
- Churchmanship: Open Catholic
- Website: St Stephen and All Martyrs

History
- Status: Parish church
- Consecrated: 26 June 1845

Architecture
- Functional status: Active
- Heritage designation: Grade II*
- Designated: 26 March 1964
- Architect: Edmund Sharpe
- Architectural type: Church
- Style: Gothic Revival
- Groundbreaking: 1842
- Completed: 1844
- Construction cost: £2,600

Specifications
- Materials: Terracotta, slate roofs

Administration
- Province: York
- Diocese: Manchester
- Archdeaconry: Bolton
- Deanery: Walmsley
- Parish: Lever Bridge

St Stephen and All Martyrs' Church, Lever Bridge, is an active Anglican parish church on Radcliffe Road in Darcy Lever, an area of Bolton in Greater Manchester, England. It belongs to the deanery of Walmsley, the archdeaconry of Bolton, and the diocese of Manchester. The church is recorded in the National Heritage List for England as a Grade II* listed building, and is the first of three "pot churches" designed by Edmund Sharpe, so called because they were constructed largely of terracotta.

== History ==
The church was built between 1842 and 1844 to a design by the Lancaster architect Edmund Sharpe. Apart from the foundations, the rubble infill of the walls, and the slate roof, the entire building was constructed in terracotta produced by the local Ladyshore Coal and TerraCotta Company, which was owned by Sharpe's brother-in-law, John Fletcher. Many of the fittings that would normally have been made of wood were also executed in terracotta. Problems in firing the terracotta led to considerable wastage; nevertheless, the church cost only £2,600 (equivalent to £290,000 in 2025) to build. It was formally opened on 18 February 1844 and consecrated on 26 June 1845 by John Bird Sumner, the Bishop of Chester. The land for the church was donated by the 2nd Earl of Bradford, and the building provided seating for 471 people.

Originally, the church had an openwork spire with crocketed pinnacles, a parapet with open tracery, and traceried windows. (Note: This openwork spire was modelled on that of Freiburg Minster in Germany which Sharpe would have seen on his three-year tour of the Continent.) By the 1930s the spire had become unsafe and was dismantled in 1937. Although there were plans to rebuild it, the lower part of the tower was dismantled by the local steeplejack Fred Dibnah in 1966. Following the discovery of extensive dry rot in 1989, a programme of repairs—including the removal of the rot—was undertaken.

== Architecture ==
=== Exterior ===
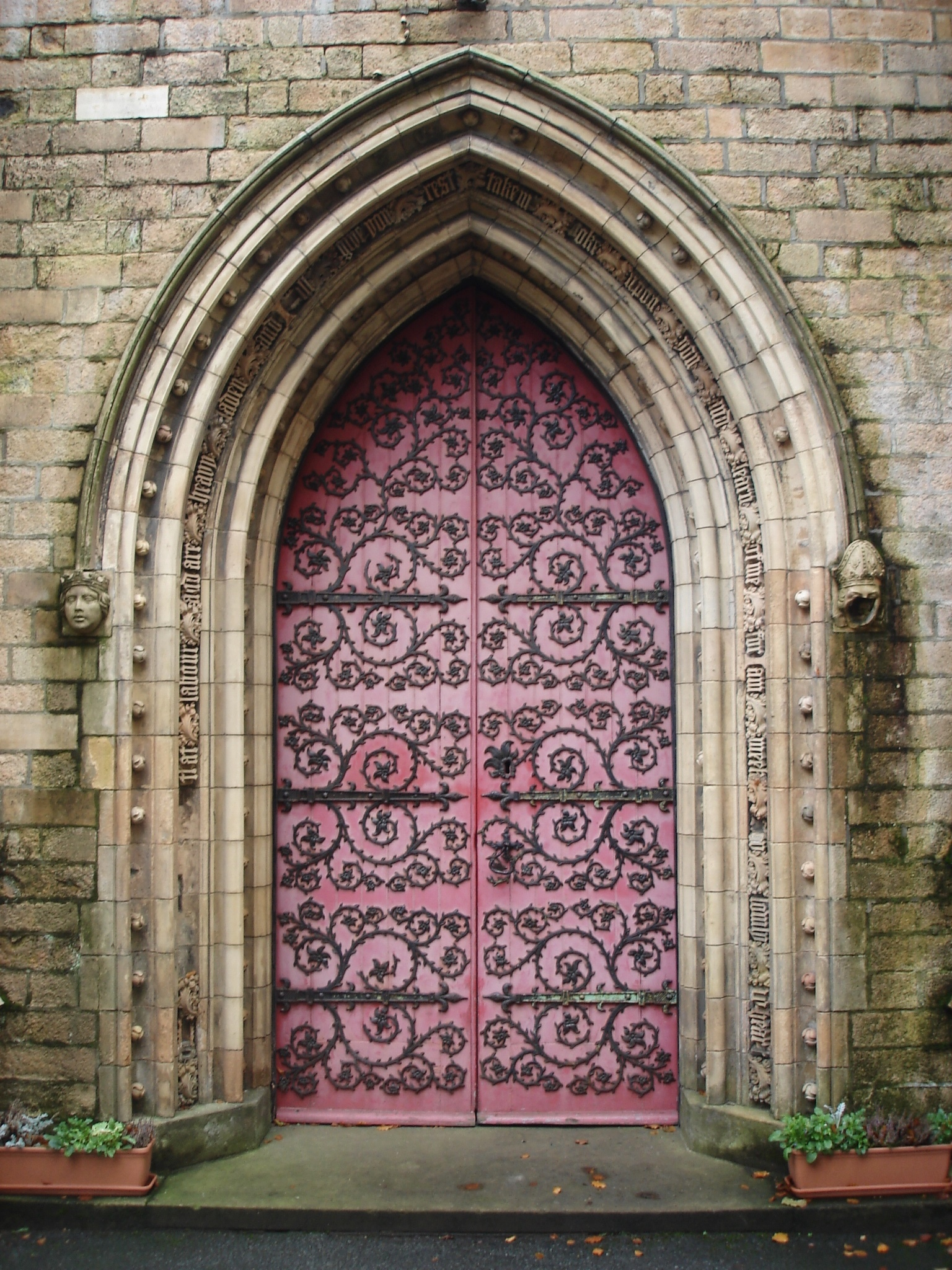
Church door

Apart from the slate roof, all the visible fabric of the church is terracotta, the use of which allowed for a high degree of decoration. The plan of the church is cruciform, conmprising a nave with a west porch (the original base of the tower), two wide transepts, a short chancel, and a vestry in the angle between the north transept and the chancel. Externally, the nave is divided into five bays by buttresses surmounted by finials. Each bay contains a two-light window in the Decorated style. The transepts and chancel are similarly divided, with four-light Decorated windows at their ends. An openwork parapet runs along the top.

=== Interior ===
Internally, the timber hammerbeam roof is carried on terracotta corbels. The interior is richly decorated with friezes, ball-flowers, foliage, inscriptions, panels, and blind arcades, all executed in terracotta. Behind the altar, forming a reredos, are niches and panelling incorporating the words of the Ten Commandments, the Creed, and the Lord's Prayer. Terracotta also forms the pew ends, which are decorated with poppy heads, as well as the organ case. The original altar, together with the octagonal diapered font and pulpit, were likewise made of terracotta. The stained glass in the east window, and in several other windows throughout the church, is by Thomas Willement; one of these depicts the execution of Charles I. A window in the south transept, by William Wailes, illustrates the stoning of Saint Stephen, while a window in the north transept was designed by Henry Holiday in 1884.

== Context and assessment ==
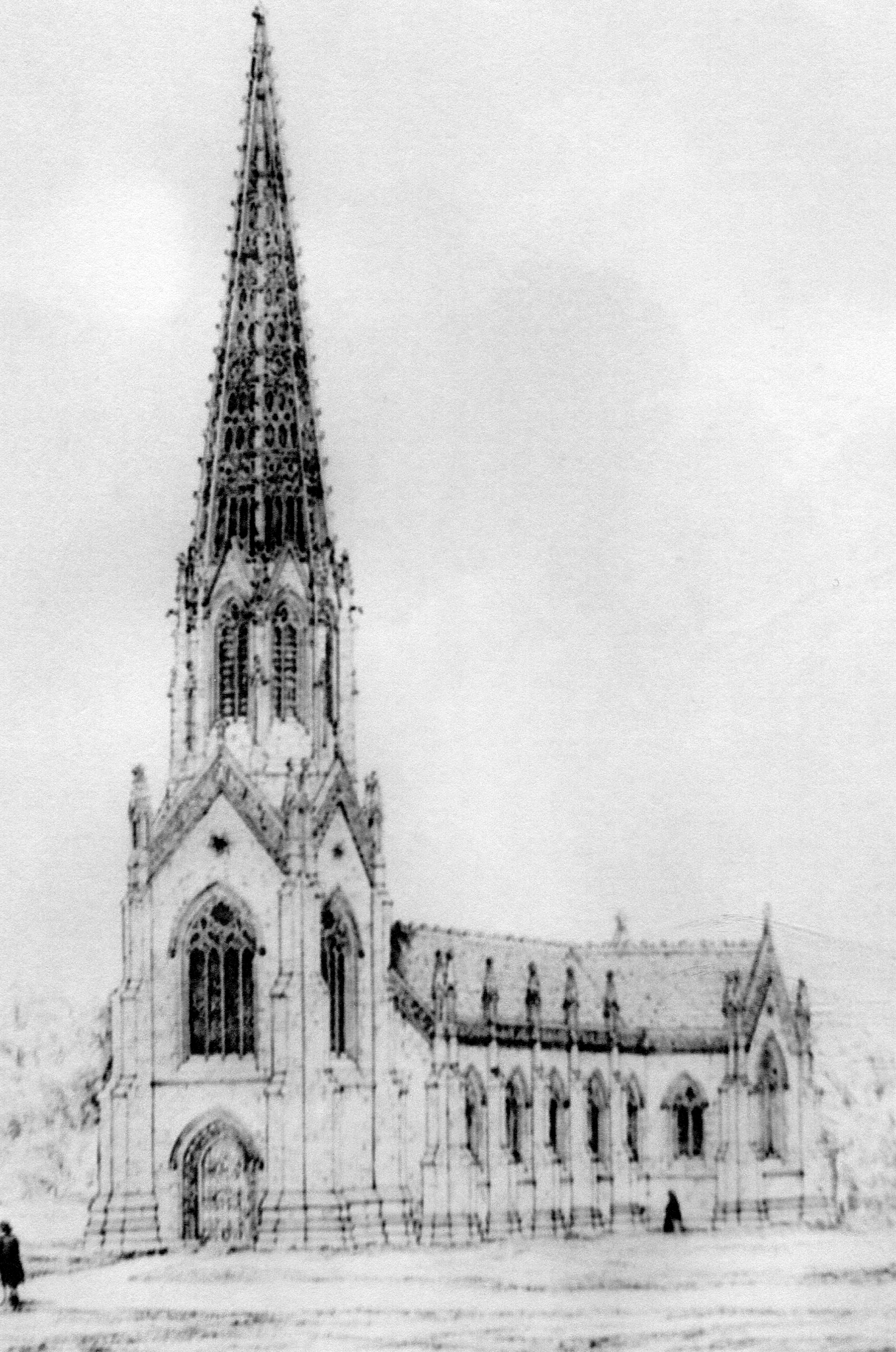
Architect's drawing of original building

Although terracotta later became a frequently used building material, particularly in the industrial North of England, it was rarely used in the construction of churches. The only churches built with this material were the three designed by Sharpe, namely Holy Trinity, Rusholme, and St Paul's, Scotforth. Its use in St Stephen's has been described as "part experiment, part advertisement". Contemporary critical reaction varied: the Illustrated London News called it a "truly elegant structure", while the Ecclesiologist dismissed its decoration as "pretense and affected". Today, the Buildings of England series notes that "the interior is exceptionally pretty", and the National Heritage List for England describes the terracotta as "a remarkable demonstration of the capabilities of the material".

== Churchyard ==
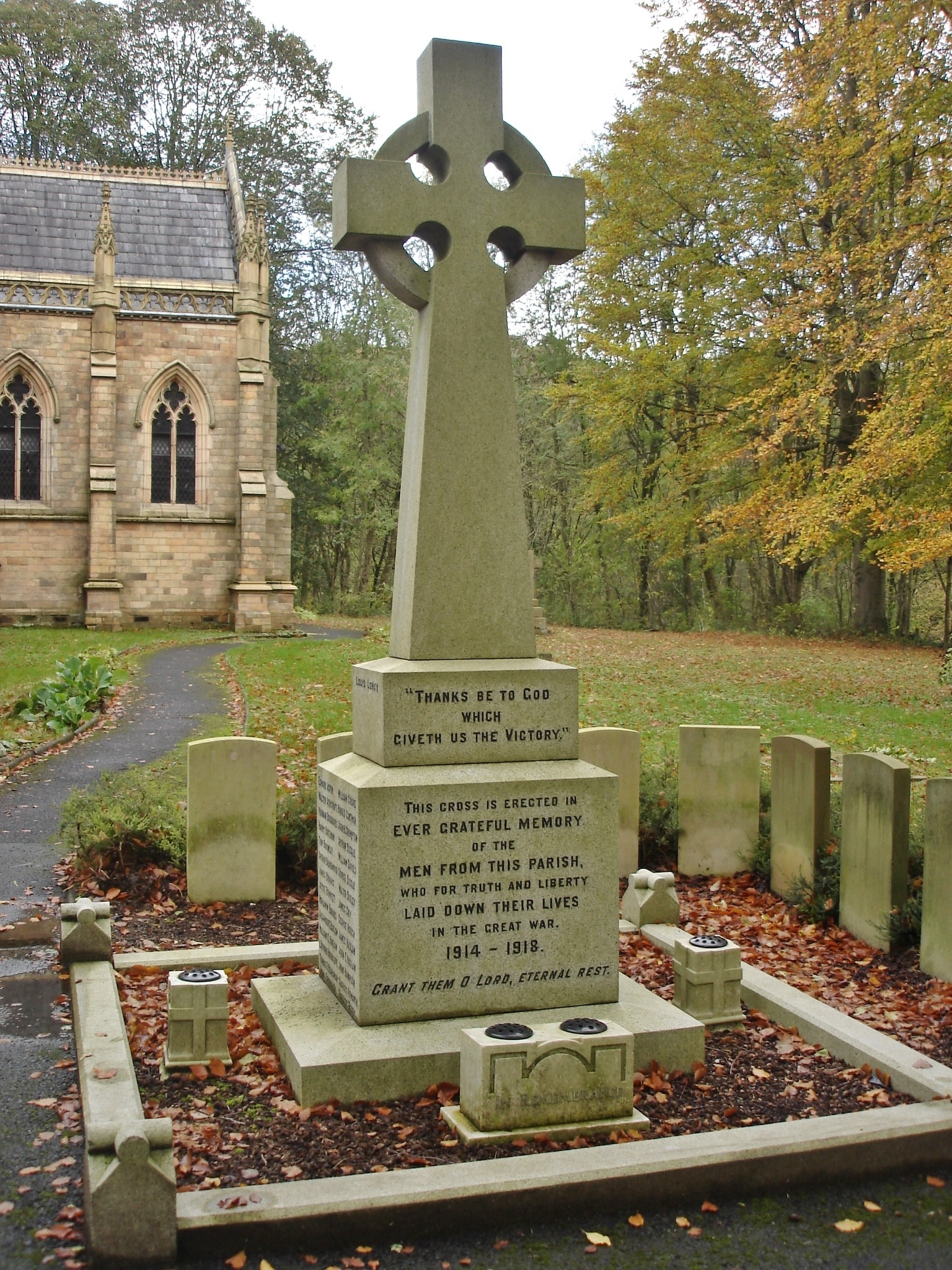
War memorial and war gravestones

The churchyard contains the war graves of nine service personnel, five from World War I and four from World War II. The original headstones, together with a commemorative stone, have been re-grouped around the base of a war memorial dedicated to the dead of both conflicts.

== See also ==
- Grade II* listed buildings in Greater Manchester
- List of architectural works by Edmund Sharpe
- Listed buildings in Bolton
