= St Mark's Church, Blackburn =

Coordinates: 53.7439°N 2.5083°W

- St Mark's Church, Witton
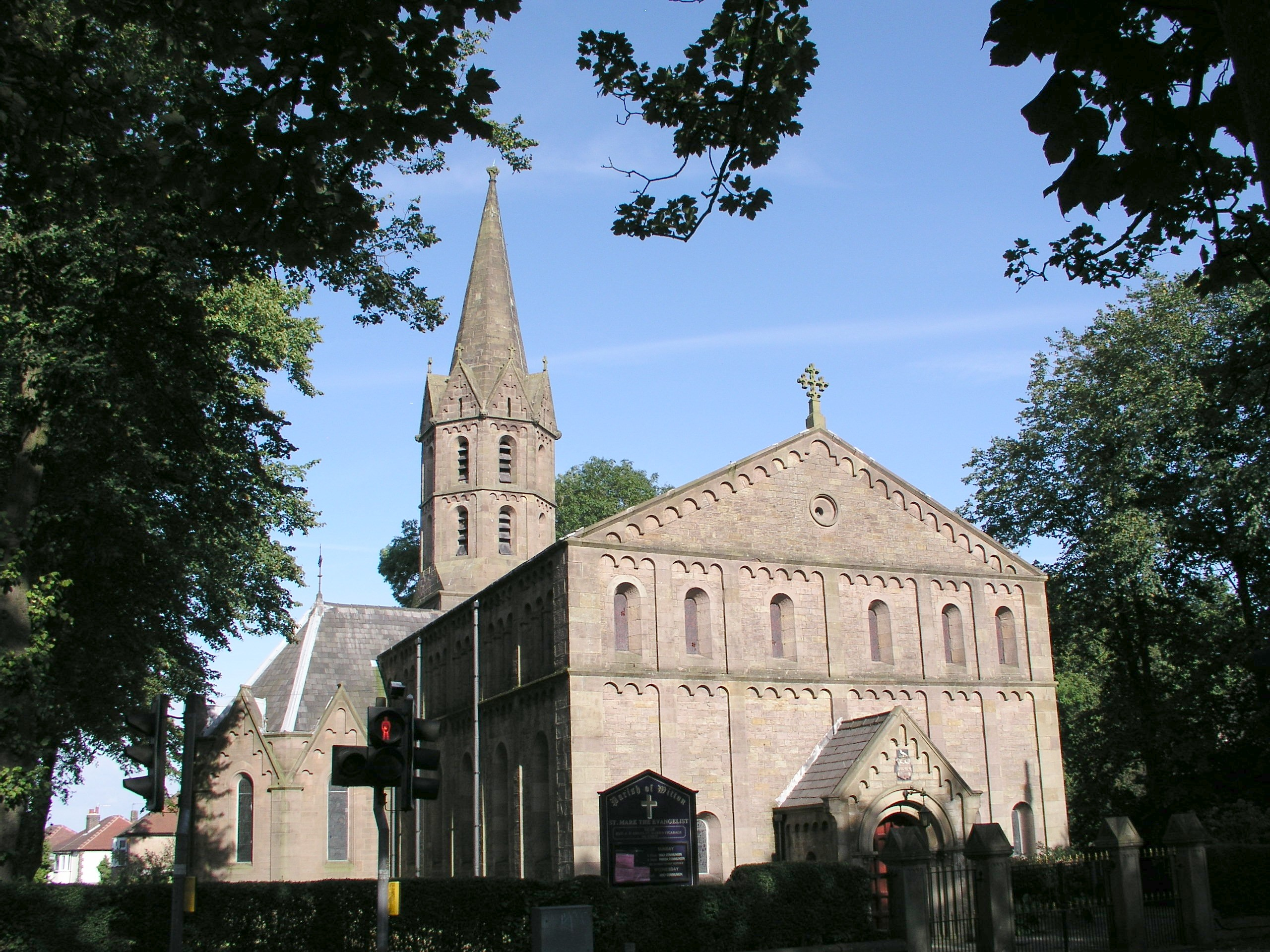
- West front of St Mark's Church, Blackburn

- Shown within Blackburn
- OS grid reference: SD 665,276
- Location: Buncer Lane, Blackburn, Lancashire
- Country: England
- Denomination: Anglican
- Website: St Mark, Witton

History
- Status: Parish church
- Founded: 1836
- Founder: Feilden family
- Dedication: St Mark
- Consecrated: 10 June 1838

Architecture
- Functional status: Redundant
- Heritage designation: Grade II*
- Designated: 19 April 1974
- Architect(s): Edmund Sharpe; E. G. Paley; Paley and Austin
- Architectural type: Church
- Style: Romanesque Revival
- Groundbreaking: 6 October 1836
- Completed: 1887

Specifications
- Materials: Stone

Administration
- Province: York
- Diocese: Blackburn
- Archdeaconry: Blackburn
- Deanery: Blackburn with Darwen
- Parish: Christ the King

Clergy
- Vicar: In vacancy

St Mark's Church is in Buncer Lane, in the former parish of Witton, Blackburn, Lancashire, England. It is a redundant Anglican church in the deanery of Blackburn with Darwen, the archdeaconry of Blackburn, and the diocese of Blackburn. It was put up for sale in 2018. Originally a separate parish, in 2005 it combined with the parish of St Luke with St Philip to form the Parish of Christ the King. The church is recorded in the National Heritage List for England as a designated Grade II* listed building.

== History ==
St Mark's is one of the oldest churches in the Blackburn diocese, and was founded by the Feilden family, the largest landowners in Blackburn at the time. Joseph Feilden gave the land for the church, contributed £200 towards its building and gave £50 for the stained glass windows. The church was built in 1836–38 to a Romanesque design by the Lancaster architect Edmund Sharpe. It was Sharpe's first commission, and one of his early churches in Romanesque style. In gaining the commission, he was helped by his older cousin Revd J. W. Whitaker, vicar of Blackburn, who was related by marriage to the Feilden family. The total cost of the church was £1,700 (equivalent to £170,000 in 2025). In addition to the donations from Feilden, two grants were received; £400 from the Chester Diocesan Society for Building Churches, and £300 from the Incorporated Church Building Society. The new church seated a congregation of 669.

The foundation stone was laid on 10 October 1836 by Joseph Feilden, and the church was consecrated on 10 June 1838 by Rt Revd John Bird Sumner, bishop of Chester, although it may have been finished before the latter date. In 1870 the south transept was added. This was designed by Sharpe's successor in the practice, E. G. Paley, to serve as a mausoleum for the Feilden family. Between 1881 and 1887 the church was restored by Paley and Austin who added the north transept and a vestry.

== Architecture ==
The architectural historian Nikolaus Pevsner considered that this was "One of the most interesting churches in Blackburn". It is built in stone. The exterior is divided into a grid pattern by lesenes (pilasters without a base or capital) and string courses. The west front is gabled and has a gabled porch. Along the sides of the church are two tiers of windows, the upper ones being smaller and narrower than the lower ones. The plan of the church is cruciform. It consists of a wide nave without aisles that suddenly contracts into a narrow chancel with a polygonal apse. The north transept is five-sided, while the south transept is square. The tower rises from the junction of the nave and the chancel. It is octagonal with a small gable rising from each face, and is surmounted by a spire. Brandwood et al describe the church as a "curious building", and comment that the tower, arising as it does from the east end of the nave, creates a narrow passage internally, which reduces the view from the nave to the chancel.

Inside the church is a west gallery with a late 20th-century screen supported by cast iron columns. The chancel screen is in Perpendicular style and dates from about 1920. The stained glass in the east window was designed by Thomas Willement and is dated 1838.

== See also ==
- Grade II* listed buildings in Lancashire
- Listed buildings in Blackburn
- List of architectural works by Edmund Sharpe
- List of ecclesiastical works by Paley and Austin
