= St Cuthbert's Church, Redmarshall =

Coordinates: 54.5844°N 1.4040°W

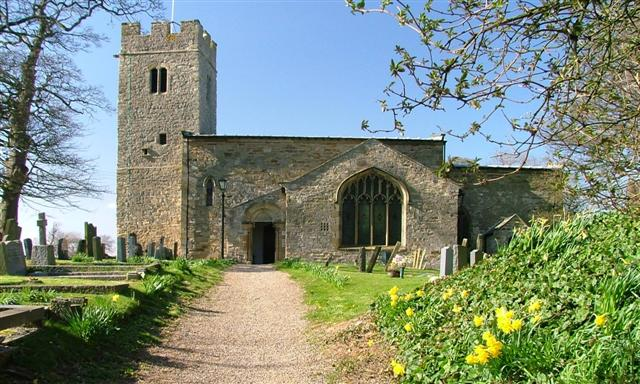
- St Cuthbert's Church, Redmarshall, from the south

- Location in County Durham
- OS grid reference: NZ 386,212
- Location: Redmarshall, County Durham
- Country: England
- Denomination: Anglican
- Website: St Cuthbert, Redmarshall

History
- Status: Parish church
- Dedication: Saint Cuthbert

Architecture
- Functional status: Active
- Heritage designation: Grade I
- Designated: 16 November 1967
- Architect(s): Edmund Sharpe; Sharpe and Paley
- Architectural type: Church
- Style: Norman, Gothic, Gothic Revival
- Groundbreaking: 12th century

Specifications
- Materials: Stone, slate roofs

Administration
- Province: York
- Diocese: Durham
- Archdeaconry: Auckland
- Deanery: Stockton
- Parish: Redmarshall

Clergy
- Rector: Revd David Martin Brooke

St Cuthbert's Church is in the village of Redmarshall, County Durham, England. It is an active Anglican parish church in the deanery of Stockton, the archdeaconry of Auckland, and the diocese of Durham. Its benefice is united with those of five nearby parishes. The church is recorded in the National Heritage List for England as a designated Grade I listed building.

== History ==
The church dates from the 12th century, with a larger chancel added during the following century. A chantry chapel was built on the south side of the church in 1311. There were further alterations in the 15th century, and again in the 19th century, including a new roof in 1806. In 1845 the Lancaster architect Edmund Sharpe replaced the former sash windows in the nave and chapel with mullioned windows in Perpendicular style. Later a gallery was added by Sharpe and his partner E. G. Paley. The east window in the chancel was replaced in 1891.

== Architecture ==
St Cuthbert's is constructed in roughly coursed rubble. It is roofed with Westmorland slate. The plan consists of a nave with a south porch, a chancel with a south chapel, and a west tower. The older parts of the church are in Norman style, newer parts in Gothic style, and the Victorian windows are Gothic Revival. The tower has a battlemented parapet. The interior of the church contains a 15th-century sedilia and an Easter sepulchre, a late Norman font, and 17th-century pews and communion rails. In the chapel are tombs bearing the effigies of Thomas de Loughton and wife dating from the middle of the 15th century. The single-manual organ was made in 1978–79 by N. Church, which replaced an earlier two-manual organ by Summers and Barnes.

== See also ==
- List of architectural works by Edmund Sharpe
- Redmarshall Old Rectory
