= St Saviour's Church, Cuerden =

Coordinates: 53.7197°N 2.6600°W

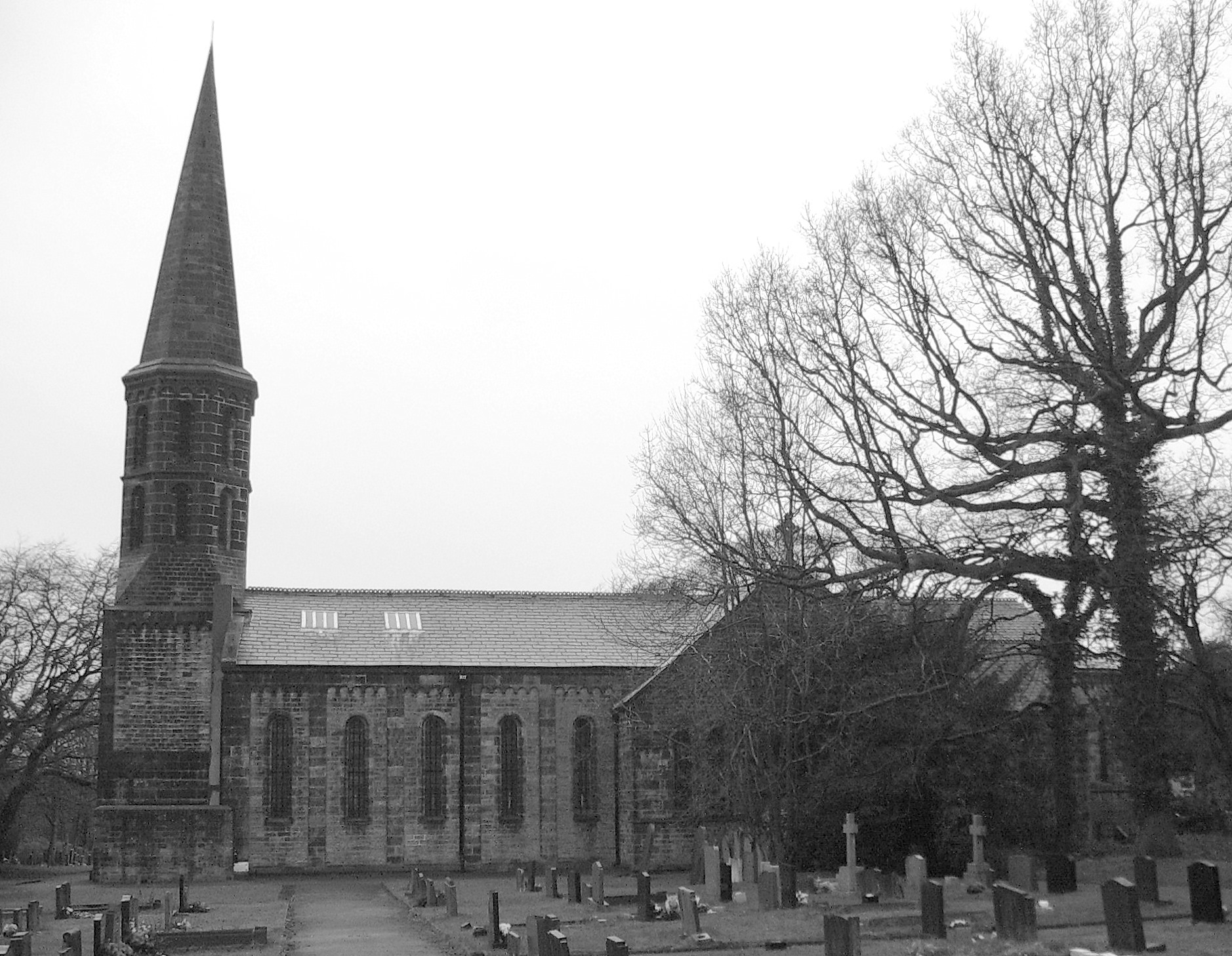
- St Saviour's Church, Cuerden, from the north

- Location in the Borough of South Ribble
- OS grid reference: SD 565,250
- Location: Cuerden, Lancashire
- Country: England
- Denomination: Anglican
- Website: St Saviour, Cuerden

History
- Status: Parish church
- Founded: 28 July 1836
- Consecrated: 3 October 1837

Architecture
- Functional status: Active
- Heritage designation: Grade II
- Designated: 27 February 1984
- Architect(s): Edmund Sharpe, T. H. Myres
- Architectural type: Church
- Style: Romanesque Revival
- Groundbreaking: 1836
- Completed: 1886

Specifications
- Materials: Sandstone, slate roof with red ridge tiles

Administration
- Province: York
- Diocese: Blackburn
- Archdeaconry: Blackburn
- Deanery: Leyland
- Parish: St Saviour, Bamber Bridge

St Saviour's Church is in the village of Cuerden, Lancashire, England. It is an active Anglican parish church in the deanery of Leyland, the archdeaconry of Blackburn and the diocese of Blackburn. The church is recorded in the National Heritage List for England as a designated Grade II listed building.

== History ==
The church was built in 1836–37 to a Romanesque design by the Lancaster architect Edmund Sharpe. It was one of Sharpe's first commissions and one of his early churches in Romanesque style. The plan for the church was signed on 9 May 1836 by Sharpe, its estimated cost being £1,360 (equivalent to £130,000 in 2025). The church was paid for mainly by public subscription. The foundation stone was laid on 28 July 1836 by Robert Townley Parker of Cuerdon Hall, who gave the land for the church. Townley Parker also gave £200 towards the cost of the church. As first built, it contained 450 seats. It was consecrated on 3 October 1837 by the Bishop of Chester. In 1886, the chancel and transepts were added in a similar style by Thomas Harrison Myres. The foundation stone for this extension was laid on 17 July 1886, and the church was re-consecrated on 10 February 1887 by the Bishop of Manchester.

== Architecture ==
St Saviour's is constructed in local sandstone, with a Welsh slate roof and red ridge tiles. Its plan consists of a five-bay nave with transepts, and a chancel with a semicircular apse. At the west end is a tower consisting of a two-stage square base, a two-stage octagonal drum and a spire. Internally is a gallery supported on cast iron columns, decorated with the Royal coat of arms. On the walls are monuments to the Townley Parker family. The font dates from the early 20th century and consists of an octagonal bowl supported by angels and a bronze cover with a figure of St John the Baptist. The two-manual organ was built in 1889 by Alexander Young.

== Churchyards ==
The main churchyard contains the Commonwealth war graves of three British service personnel of World War I and two of World War II, and its churchyard extension three war graves of British soldiers of World War I.

== See also ==
- Listed buildings in Walton-le-Dale
- List of architectural works by Edmund Sharpe
