= Holy Trinity Church, Blackburn =

Coordinates: 53.7511°N 2.4746°W

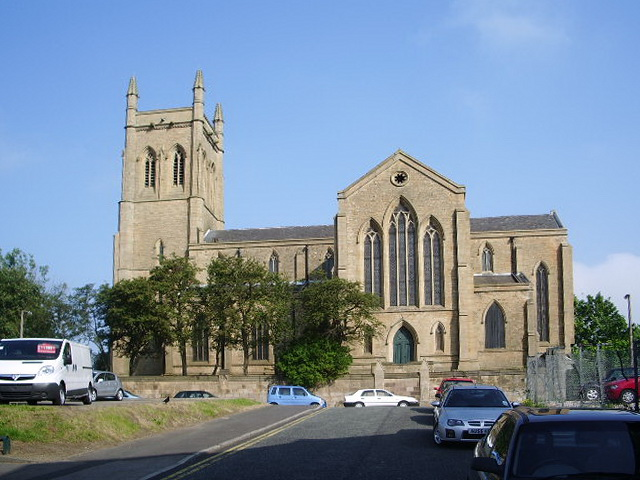
- Holy Trinity Church, Blackburn, from the south

- Shown within Blackburn town centre
- OS grid reference: SD 688,284
- Location: Mount Pleasant, Blackburn, Lancashire
- Country: England
- Denomination: Anglican
- Website: Churches Conservation Trust

History
- Founder: Rev J. W. Whittaker
- Dedication: Holy Trinity
- Consecrated: 12 July 1846

Architecture
- Functional status: Redundant
- Heritage designation: Grade II
- Designated: 13 May 1987
- Architect: Edmund Sharpe
- Architectural type: Church
- Style: Gothic Revival
- Groundbreaking: 1837
- Completed: 1853
- Construction cost: £5,019 (equivalent to £510,000 in 2025)
- Closed: 1981

Specifications
- Materials: Stone

Holy Trinity Church is in Mount Pleasant, Blackburn, Lancashire, England. It is a former Anglican parish church which is now redundant and under the care of the Churches Conservation Trust. It is recorded in the National Heritage List for England as a designated Grade II listed building.

== History ==
The church was built between 1837 and 1846 at a cost of £5,019 (equivalent to £510,000 in 2025). It was a Commissioners' church, receiving a grant of £1,519 towards its cost from the Church Building Society. The church was designed by the Lancaster architect Edmund Sharpe, the project being instigated by the Rev J. W. Whittaker, Sharpe's cousin and the vicar of Blackburn. The foundation stone was laid on 11 October 1837 by Rev John Bird Sumner, then the Bishop of Chester. It opened for worship in January 1846, and was consecrated on 12 July of that year. The church provided seating for 1,626 people. The completion of the tower was delayed due to lack of funds until 1853, and the intended spire was never built. In 1860 internal alterations were carried out under the direction of E. G. Paley, Sharpe's successor in the practice. The galleries were reconstructed and new stalls were added, providing 200 more seats. The organ was removed to a position behind the pulpit. These alterations cost over £1,000 (equivalent to £110,000 in 2025). Between 1942 and 1949 the vicar of the church was Chad Varah, who later founded The Samaritans. In 1946 the side galleries were removed, retaining the west gallery. Holy Trinity was declared redundant on 1 April 1981, and was vested in the Trust on 18 May 1984.

== Architecture ==
=== Exterior ===
Holy Trinity is designed in Gothic Revival style. Its plan consists of a three-bay nave with a clerestory, north and south lean-to aisles, north and south transepts rising to the full height of the nave, and a chancel. The tower has three stages, with lancet windows in the lower stages and two twin-light louvre style bell openings on each side in the top stage. At the summit is a plain parapet with a pinnacle at each corner. All the windows are tall. At the east ends of the transepts and the chancel, the window arrangement is unusual, consisting of 2-3-2 lights, a feature more commonly found in Germany. (Note: This feature was seen by Sharpe during his tour of the Continent in 1833–35, for example at St Marien auf dem Berge, Herford.)

=== Interior ===
Internally there are slim compound piers and a west gallery. The ceiling is flat and divided into 80 panels by moulded ribs. Each of the panels contains a painting of a coat of arms. At the centre of the crossing are the royal coat of arms of Queen Victoria. Elsewhere are the arms of the other monarchs, going back to Edward the Confessor, bishops and other churchmen (including Whittaker), and William Whewell (one of Sharpe's patrons). The painters employed included William Birch, Benjamin West, John Brocklehurst and Samuel Driver. The organ was moved from Hanover Square Rooms, London. It was rebuilt and restored by Gray and Davidson in 1851 and installed in the west gallery. At a later date it was moved to the southeast of the chancel and rebuilt. In 1937 it was rebuilt again and enlarged by Laycock and Bannister of Keighley.

== Assessment ==
The church was designated as a Grade II listed church on 13 May 1987. It is Sharpe's largest and grandest church. Sharpe's biographer, John Hughes, describes it as his pièce de résistance.

== See also ==
- Listed buildings in Blackburn
- List of architectural works by Edmund Sharpe
- List of Commissioners' churches in Northeast and Northwest England
- List of churches preserved by the Churches Conservation Trust in Northern England

== References and notes ==
Notes

Citations

Sources

- Brandwood, Geoff; Austin, Tim; Hughes, John; Price, James (2012), The Architecture of Sharpe, Paley and Austin, Swindon: English Heritage, ISBN 978-1-84802-049-8
- Hartwell, Clare; Pevsner, Nikolaus (2009) [1969], Lancashire: North, The Buildings of England, New Haven and London: Yale University Press, ISBN 978-0-300-12667-9
- Hughes, John M. (2010), Edmund Sharpe: Man of Lancaster (CD), John M. Hughes
- Port, M. H. (2006), 600 New Churches: The Church Building Commission 1818–1856 (2nd ed.), Reading: Spire Books, ISBN 978-1-904965-08-4
