= Edmund Sharpe =

English architect and engineer (1809–1877)

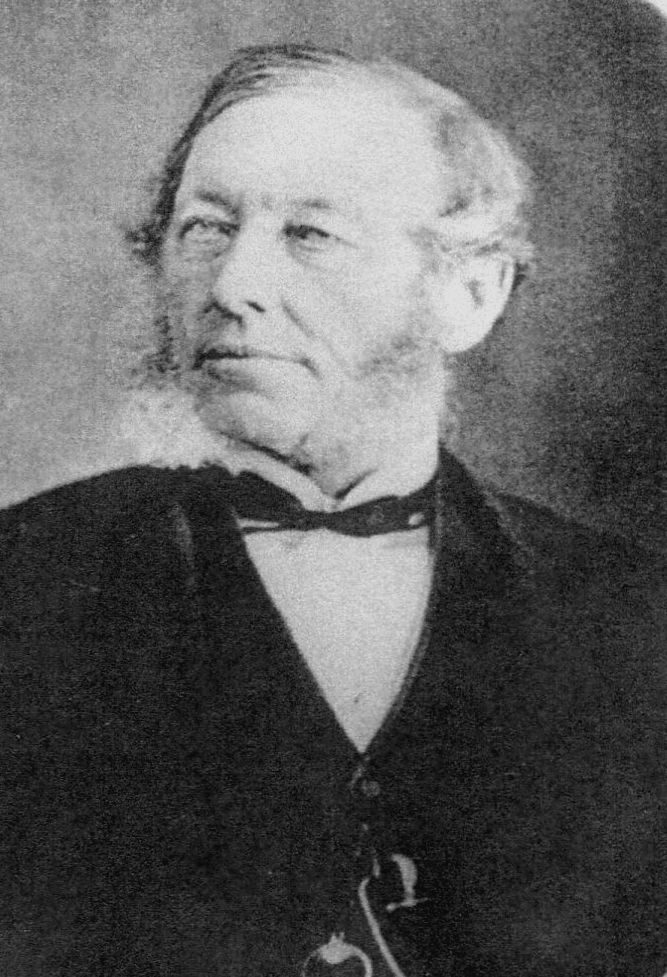
- Sharpe, c. 1860
- Born: 31 October 1809; Knutsford, Cheshire, England
- Died: 8 May 1877 (aged 67); Milan, Italy
- Occupations: Architect; architectural historian; railway engineer; sanitary reformer

Edmund Sharpe (31 October 1809 – 8 May 1877) was an English architect, architectural historian, railway engineer and sanitary reformer. Born in Knutsford, Cheshire, he was educated first by his parents and then at schools locally and in Runcorn, Greenwich and Sedbergh. Following his graduation from Cambridge University he was awarded a travelling scholarship, enabling him to study architecture in Germany and southern France. In 1835 he established an architectural practice in Lancaster, initially working on his own. In 1845 he entered into partnership with Edward Paley, one of his pupils. Sharpe's main focus was on churches, and he was a pioneer in the use of terracotta as a structural material in church building, designing what were known as "pot" churches, the first of which was St Stephen and All Martyrs' Church, Lever Bridge.

He also designed secular buildings, including residential buildings and schools, and worked on the development of railways in north-west England, designing bridges and planning new lines. In 1851 he resigned from his architectural practice, and in 1856 he moved from Lancaster, spending the remainder of his career mainly as a railway engineer, first in North Wales, then in Switzerland and southern France. Sharpe returned to England in 1866 to live in Scotforth near Lancaster, where he designed a final church near to his home.

While working in his architectural practice, Sharpe was involved in Lancaster's civic affairs. He was an elected town councillor and served as mayor in 1848–49. Concerned about the town's poor water supply and sanitation, he championed the construction of new sewers and a waterworks. He was a talented musician, and took part in the artistic, literary, and scientific activities in the town. Also an accomplished sportsman, he took an active interest in archery, rowing and cricket.

Sharpe achieved national recognition as an architectural historian. He published books of detailed architectural drawings, wrote a number of articles on architecture, devised a scheme for the classification of English Gothic architectural styles, and in 1875 was awarded the Royal Gold Medal of the Royal Institute of British Architects. He was critical of much of the restoration of medieval churches that had become a major occupation of contemporary architects. Towards the end of his career Sharpe organised expeditions to study and draw buildings in England and France. While on such an expedition to Italy in 1877, he was taken ill and died. His body was taken to Lancaster, where he was buried. Sharpe's legacy consists of about 40 extant churches; railway features, including the Conwy Valley Line and bridges on what is now the Lancashire section of the West Coast Main Line; and his archive of architectural books, articles and drawings.

== Early life ==
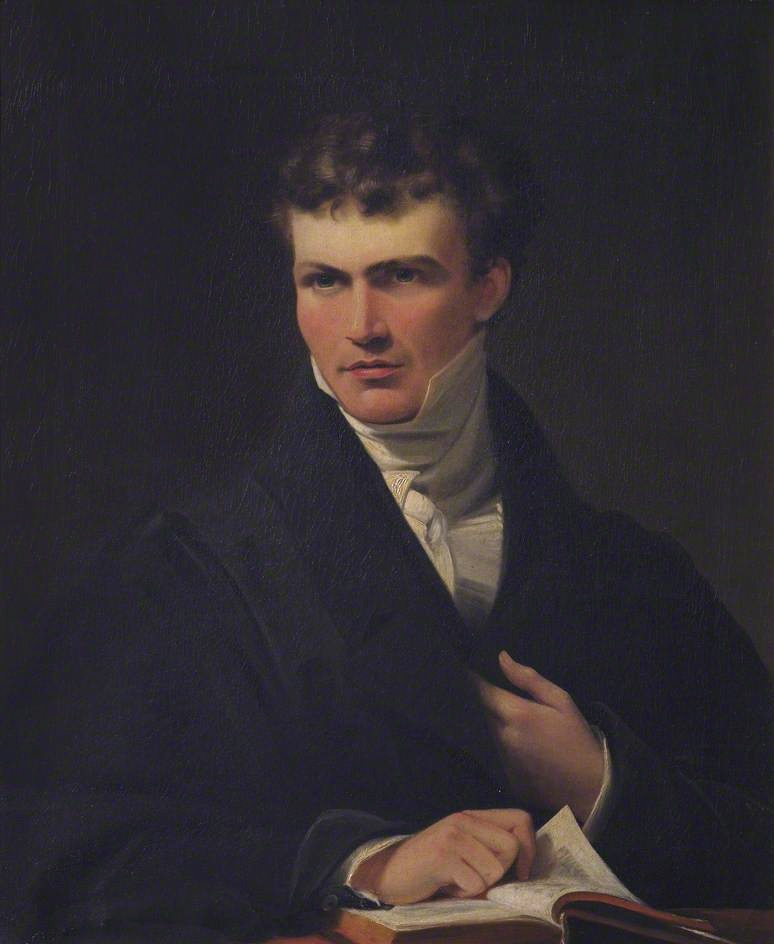
William Whewell, Professor of Mineralogy when Sharpe was studying at Cambridge

Edmund Sharpe was born on 31 October 1809 at Brook Cottage, Brook Street in Knutsford, Cheshire, the first child of Francis and Martha Sharpe. His father, a peripatetic music teacher and organist at Knutsford parish church, came from Stamford in Lincolnshire. At the time of marriage his wife, Martha Whittaker, was on the staff of an academy for young ladies, Belvedere House, in Bath, Somerset. During his childhood in Knutsford, the young Edmund played with Elizabeth Stevenson, the future Mrs Gaskell. In 1812 the Sharpe family moved across town from Over Knutsford to a farm in Nether Knutsford called Heathside, when Francis Sharpe then worked as both farmer and music teacher. Edmund was initially educated by his parents, but by 1818 he was attending a school in Knutsford. Two years later he was a boarder at a school near Runcorn, and in 1821 at Burney's Academy in Greenwich. Edmund's father died suddenly in November 1823, aged 48, and his mother moved to Lancaster with her family, where she later resumed her teaching career.

Edmund continued his education at Burney's Academy, and became head boy. In August 1827 he moved to Sedbergh School (then in the West Riding of Yorkshire, now in Cumbria), where he remained for two years. In November 1829 he entered St John's College, Cambridge as a Lupton scholar. At the end of his course in 1832 he was awarded a Worts Travelling Bachelorship by the University of Cambridge, which enabled him to travel abroad for three years' study.^{[A]} At this time his friend from Lancaster at Trinity College, William Whewell, was Professor of Mineralogy. John Hughes, Edmund Sharpe's biographer, is of the opinion that Whewell was influential in gaining this award for Sharpe. Edmund graduated BA in 1833, and was admitted to the degree of MA in 1836. During his time abroad he travelled in Germany and southern France, studying Romanesque and early Gothic architecture. He had intended to travel further into northern France, but his tour was curtailed in Paris owing to "fatigue and illness". Edmund returned home to Lancaster late in 1835, having by then decided to become an architect. In December he wrote a letter to William Whewell saying that he had "finally determined to adopt the Profession of Architecture". Some sources state that Sharpe was articled to the architect Thomas Rickman. Sharpe did visit Rickman for a few days in 1832 and corresponded with him later. He may have been "acting as a research assistant" while on the Continent, but Hughes states "there is no evidence to suggest that Sharpe spent more time with Rickman, or served any kind of formal apprenticeship with him".

== Architect ==
=== Lancaster practice ===
Edmund Sharpe started his practice at the end of 1835 in his mother's house in Penny Street, moving into premises in Sun Street in 1838. In October that year he took as his pupil Edward Graham Paley, then aged 15. Later in 1838 Sharpe took a house in St Leonard's Gate large enough to accommodate himself and Paley; the practice continued to use the premises in Sun Street until after Sharpe's retirement. In 1841 Thomas Austin also joined the practice as a pupil, staying until 1852 when he left to set up on his own as an architect in Newcastle upon Tyne. In 1845 Sharpe made Paley a partner, and in 1847 effectively handed the business over to him. At about this time also, John Douglas joined the firm as Paley's assistant, and stayed with the firm until about 1859, when he moved to Chester to establish his own practice. Sharpe retired completely from the practice in 1851, leaving Paley as sole principal. Also in 1851 Paley married Sharpe's sister, Frances.

=== Churches ===
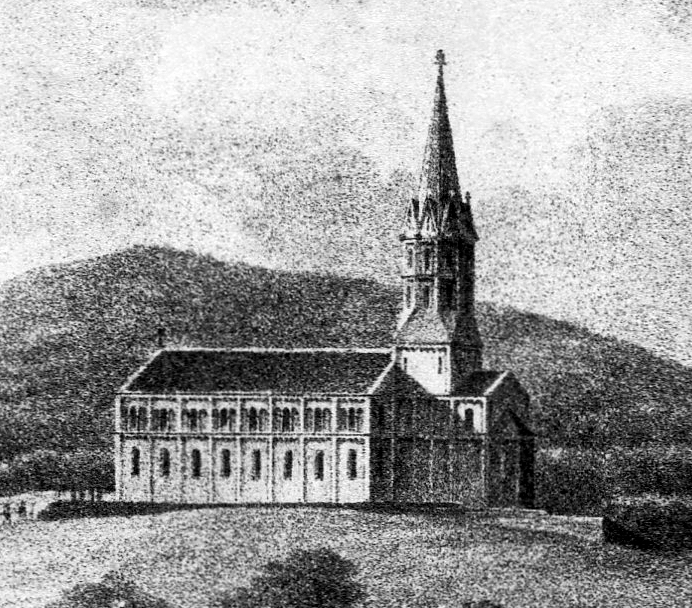
St Mark's Church, Witton, one of Sharpe's earliest churches

In his letter of December 1835 to William Whewell, Sharpe also mentioned that plans for at least one church, St Mark's at Witton, west of Blackburn, were already well advanced, and that he was working towards another one, St Saviour's near Bamber Bridge, south of Preston. In addition, he was in contact with the Earl of Derby with a view to designing a church for him near his seat at Knowsley, northeast of Liverpool.

Four of Sharpe's earliest churches – St Saviour, Bamber Bridge (1836–37); St Mark, Witton (1836–38); Christ Church, Chatburn (1837–38); and St Paul, Farington, near Leyland (1839–40) – were in the Romanesque style, which he chose because "no style can be worked so cheap as the Romanesque". They "turned out to be little more than rectangular 'preaching boxes'... with no frills and little ornamentation; and many of them were later enlarged". The only subsequent churches in which Sharpe used Romanesque elements were the chapel of All Saints, Marthall, near Knutsford (1839); St Mary, Conistone in Wharfedale (1846); and St Paul, Scotforth in south Lancaster (1874), the last built towards the end of his life.

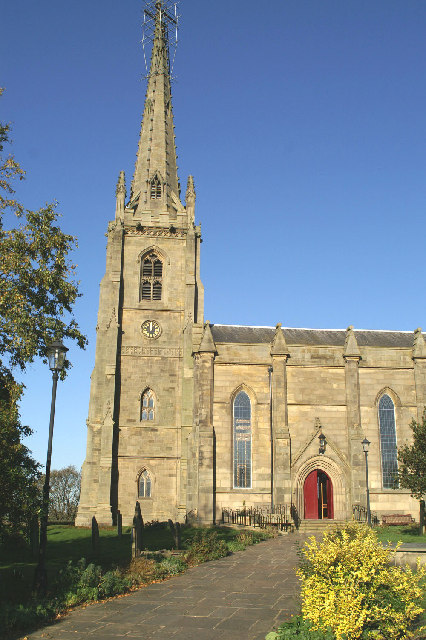
St Michael's Church, Kirkham showing Sharpe's steeple

By 1838 Sharpe had begun to experiment with elements of English Gothic architecture, initially in the Early English style and in particular the lancet window, dating from the early 12th century or earlier. The first church he built in this style was St John the Evangelist, Cowgill, Dent, (1837–38), followed closely by Holy Trinity, Howgill (1837–38), and then by several others in the same style. He was soon incorporating elements from later styles of English Gothic architecture, and by 1839 was designing churches using Perpendicular features, as at St Peter, Stainforth (1839–42), St John the Baptist, Bretherton, and St Peter, Mawdesley (both 1839–40).

Sharpe was one of the architects who designed churches for the Church Building Commission, which had been established by the Church Building Acts of 1818 and 1824. The resulting churches have been called Commissioners' churches, and were built to provide places of worship in newly populated areas. Sharpe designed six churches for the Commission: St John, Dukinfield, St George, Stalybridge (both 1838–40), St John the Baptist, Bretherton, St Paul, Farington, St Catharine, Scholes (near Wigan; 1839–41), and Holy Trinity, Blackburn (1837–46).^{[B]}He is also credited with the design of St. Bridgets, Beckermet, Cumberland (1842–43).

Although some architects designed the earlier Commissioners' churches in neoclassical style, most were in Gothic Revival style. The earliest of the Gothic Revival churches were based loosely on the Early English style, with single or paired lancet windows between buttresses in the sides of the church, and stepped triple lancets at the east end. Others were in a "stilted Perpendicular" style, with "thin west towers, thin buttresses, fat pinnacles, and interiors with three galleries and plaster vaults". These features were only loosely derived from medieval Gothic architecture, and were not true representations of it. A major influence on the subsequent development of the Gothic Revival was AWN Pugin (1812–52) and, influenced by him, the Cambridge Camden Society (later named the Ecclesiological Society). Among other things, they argued that not only should Gothic be the only right and proper style for churches, but that their features should be accurate representations of that style; they should be "correct" Gothic features, rather than being loosely derived from the style. The term "pre-archaeological" was used to describe churches designed using features only loosely derived from true Gothic.

Sharpe's early Gothic Revival works were pre-archaeological, including Holy Trinity, Blackburn, built in 1837–46 for Revd JW Whittaker. Hughes expresses the opinion that this church is Sharpe's pièce de resistance, it contains "a mongrel mix of Gothic styles".^{[C]} Simultaneously Sharpe was involved in the design of about twelve more churches in Northwest England, which increasingly incorporated more "correct" Gothic features. In 1841 he obtained a contract to build three churches and associated structures (vicarages and schools) for the Weaver Navigation Trustees, at Weston Point, Runcorn; Castle, Northwich; and Winsford. All three were in Cheshire, and built between 1841 and 1844. Between 1835 and 1842 Sharpe designed about 30 new churches in Lancashire and Cheshire, all to a low budget, and all to a degree pre-archaeological. In 1843 Sharpe was able to fulfil his promise to build a church for the Earl of Derby; this was St Mary, Knowsley, which was completed and consecrated the following year. It is described by Hughes as "one of Sharpe's loveliest creations". About the same time he designed a new steeple for St Michael, Kirkham; the steeple and St Mary's Church contained much more in the way of "correct" Gothic features, and both were praised by the Camden Society in The Ecclesiologist.

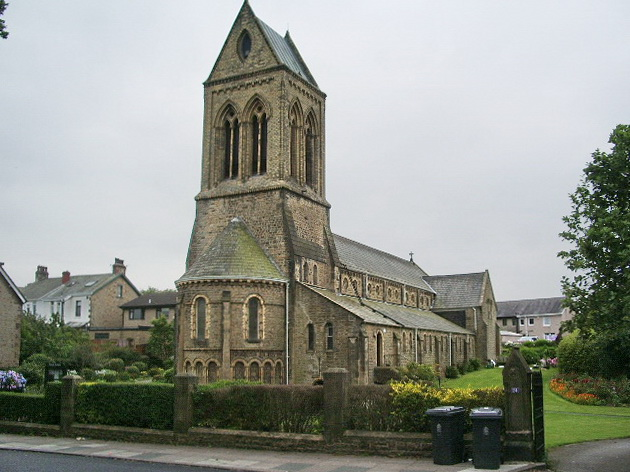
St Paul's Church, Scotforth, Sharpe's last church

In the early 1840s Sharpe was invited by John Fletcher, his future brother-in-law, to build a church near Fletcher's home in Little Bolton. Fletcher was the owner of a coal mine at Ladyshore, Little Lever, overlooking the River Irwell and the Manchester, Bolton & Bury Canal. He had been using the clay which came up with the coal to make refractory bricks for furnaces, and suggested its use for building the church, as it was much cheaper than stone. Sharpe then designed the first church in England to be built, in whole or in part, from this material (terracotta), St Stephen and All Martyrs, Lever Bridge (1842–44). As terracotta is commonly used to make plant pots and the like, Sharpe himself called this church, and its two successors, "the pot churches", a nickname that has stuck. The advantages of terracotta were its cheapness, its sturdiness as a building material, and the fact that it could be moulded into almost any shape. It could therefore be used for walls, towers, arches, and arcades in a church, for the detailed decoration of capitals and pinnacles, and also, as at St Stephen's, for the furnishings, such as the altar, pulpit, font, organ case, and the pew ends. Apart from the foundations and the rubble within the walls, St Stephen and All Martyrs was constructed entirely from terracotta.^{[D]} The following year, a second church was built using the same material, Trinity Church, Rusholme, south of Manchester (1845–46), built and paid for by Thomas Carill-Worsley, who lived at nearby Platt Hall. In this case, although the exterior is in terracotta, the interior is of plastered brick. The church was consecrated in June 1846, although at the time work on the spire had not yet started and several other features were incomplete, including the heating, seating, and floor tiling.^{[E]}

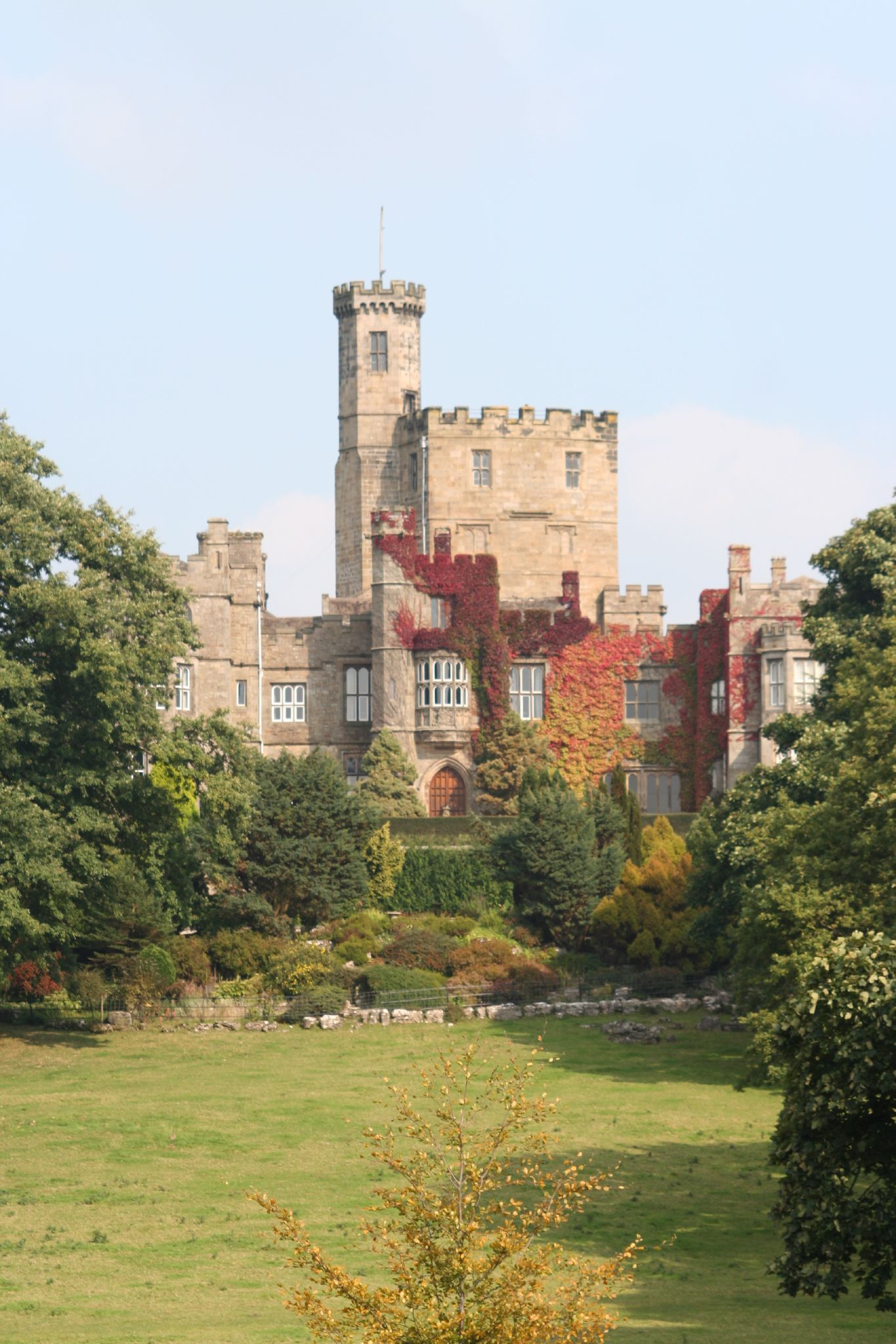
Hornby Castle, remodelled by Sharpe

Towards the end of his life, Sharpe designed one more church incorporating terracotta, St Paul, Scotforth, Lancaster (1874–76). For this he returned to the Romanesque style, and used terracotta as a building and a decorative material. By this time he was living in Scotforth, then a separate village to the south of Lancaster, but now absorbed into the city. The new church was built within 300 yards (274 m) of his home, and again terracotta was not the only material used. It is used for the dressings, windows, doorways, the upper part of the tower, and internally for the piers and arches of the aisle arcades, but the walls are of stone.

=== Other structures ===
During his time as an architect Sharpe was also involved in the building, repair, and restoration of non-ecclesiastic structures, including houses and bridges. In 1837 he was appointed bridgemaster for the Hundred of Lonsdale South of the Sands, and in 1839 he supervised the repair of Skerton Bridge over the River Lune in Lancaster. The following year he designed a new bridge over the River Hyndburn at Fournessford, a village to the east of Wray. He had also been appointed as architect and superintendent of works for Lancaster Castle, the Judges' Lodgings, and the County Lunatic Asylum (later the Lancaster Moor Hospital). For the asylum he designed several new wings and a chapel, followed by extensions to the union workhouse. Sharpe was also involved in designing and altering several domestic buildings. In 1843 he designed a vicarage in Cockermouth, and the following year he started to remodel Capernwray Hall, a country house northeast of Lancaster. In the same year he designed the Governor's House for Knutsford Gaol, and in 1845 he re-designed Redmarshall Old Rectory for the Revd Thomas Austin, father of Sharpe's pupil (also named Thomas). Following Paley's becoming a partner in 1845, the pair worked together to design Lee Bridge in Over Wyresdale (1847), to plan the conversion of a disused manor house into the Furness Abbey Hotel (1847), and to arrange the remodelling of Hornby Castle (1847–52). In 1849–50 they planned the rebuilding and enlargement of the Charity School for Girls in Middle Street, Lancaster, followed in 1851 by the National School for Boys in St Leonard's Gate. The practice then made plans for a new building at Giggleswick School, and new premises for Lancaster Grammar School in Moor Lane, but by then Sharpe was on the point of withdrawing from the practice, and it is likely that most of the designs were prepared by Paley.

== Architectural historian ==
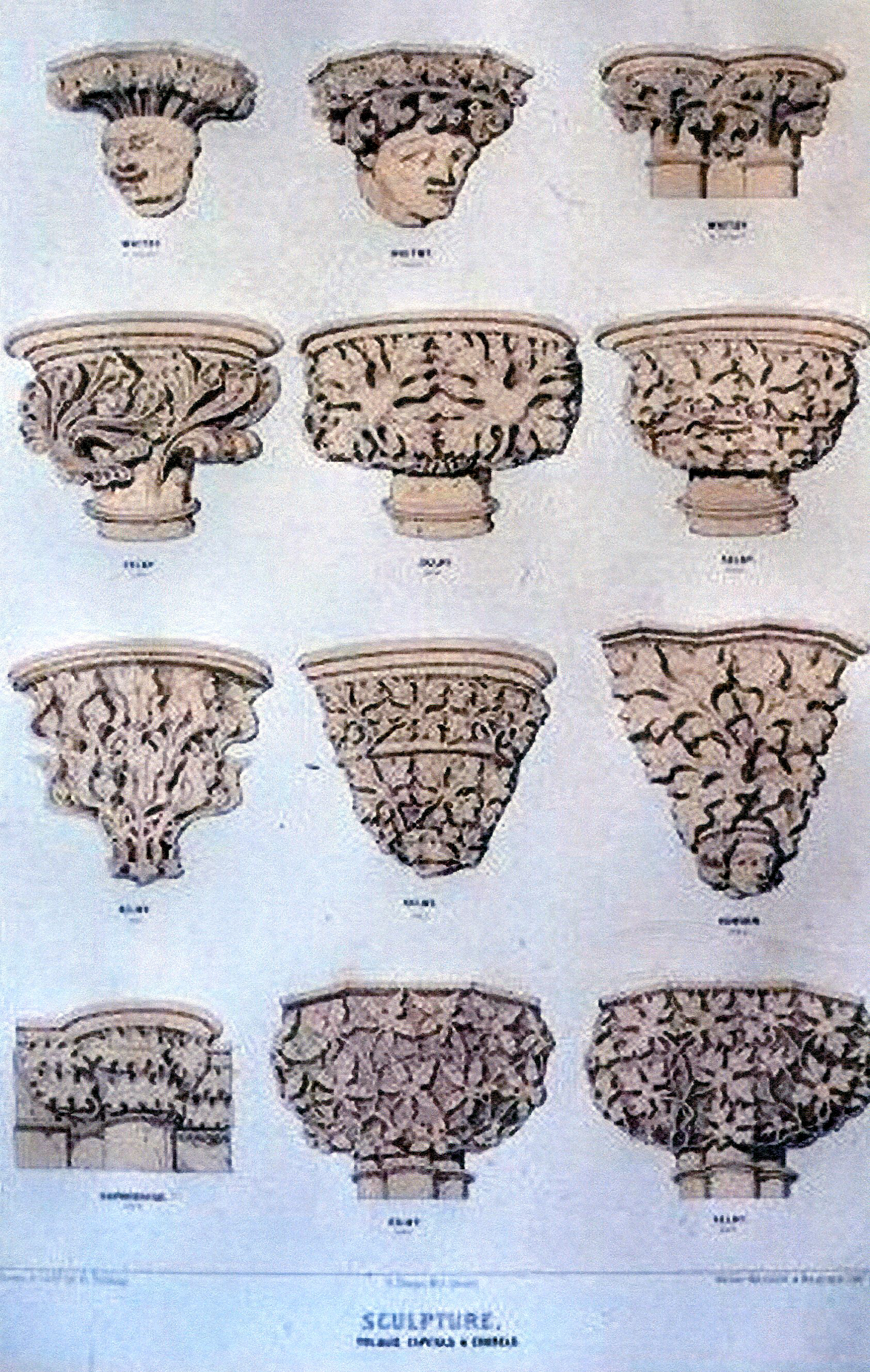
Page from Architectural Parallels

Sharpe studied and wrote about ecclesiastical architecture throughout his adult life, both sketching and measuring historical churches and ruins. This resulted in a systematic series of published drawings in twelve parts between 1845 and 1847 entitled Architectural Parallels, containing measured drawings of abbey churches in the early Gothic style, and reissued as a single work in 1848. Sharpe intended to produce a further version with text, but this never transpired. Also in 1848 a Supplement to Architectural Parallels, was published, containing yet more detailed drawings. Simultaneously, Sharpe had produced the two-volume work Decorated Windows, the first volume being published in 1845, and the second in 1849. The work, which was praised by the art critic John Ruskin in The Stones of Venice, consisted largely of drawings by Sharpe's pupils – Paley, Austin, and R. J. Withers – with text by Sharpe describing and analysing the tracery of Gothic windows.

In 1851 Sharpe published a monograph entitled The Seven Periods of English Architecture, a small book of about 50 pages suggesting a new scheme for classifying the styles of English ecclesiastical architecture "from the Heptarchy to the Reformation". It was intended to replace the scheme then in use, which had been proposed in 1817 by Thomas Rickman. Rickman had divided English architecture into "four distinct periods, or styles" which he termed "Norman", "Early English", "Decorated English", and "Perpendicular English". The Norman style lasting until about 1189, was characterised by its arches usually being semicircular, although sometimes pointed; the ornamentation was "bold and rude". The Early English style, continuing to about 1307, was distinguished by its pointed arches and long narrow windows without mullions. He called the characteristic ornamentation "toothed" because it resembled the teeth of the shark. The following period, the Decorated English lasted until 1377, or possibly 10–15 years later, was characterised by large windows with pointed arches containing mullions, and with tracery "in flowing lines forming circles, arches and other figures". There was much ornamentation, carved very delicately. The final period identified by Rickman, the Perpendicular English, lasted until as long as 1630 or 1640. This was distinguished by the mullions and the "ornamental panellings" running in perpendicular lines. The ornamentation was in many cases "so crowded as to destroy the beauty of the design". The carving was again "very delicately executed".

In his classification, Sharpe first identified two main classes, according to whether the arches were "circular" or "pointed". The class characterised by the circular arch was the Romanesque class; that by the pointed arch was the Gothic. He divided the Romanesque class into two periods by date rather than by stylistic differences, the dividing date being 1066; this divided the "Saxon" from the "Norman" stage. Whereas Rickman allowed pointed arches when they occurred in the same building as round arches in his Norman period, Sharpe separated buildings that contained both types of arches into a separate intermediate style, the "Transitional". When it came to the Gothic class, Sharpe identified four styles, in contrast to Rickman's three, using the windows to differentiate between them. The earliest style was characterised by windows resembling a lancet "in its length, breadth, and principal proportions". These windows might be single, or in groups of two, three, five, or seven. This style he termed the "Lancet Period". During the next period, tracery appeared in the windows, and originally consisted of simple geometric forms, in particular the circle. This period he called the "Geometrical Period". Later the tracery became more complex, including the ogee curve; the characteristic feature being the "sinuosity of form" in the windows and elsewhere. This Sharpe termed the "Curvilinear Period". Finally, the transom appeared in the windows, and the curved line in the tracery became replaced by straight lines, an "angularity of form", and a "square edge was preferred". This style he named the "Rectilinear Period". The approximate dates Sharpe gave for his periods were, following 1066, the Norman Period up to 1145, the Transitional Period to 1190, the Lancet Period to 1245, the Geometrical Period to 1315, the Curvilinear Period to 1360, and the Rectilinear Period to 1550.

In comparing the two classifications, Sharpe divides Rickman's Norman period into two, the Norman and the Transitional periods. Then Rickman has three Gothic periods in contrast to Sharpe's four. Comparing the descriptions of the styles and, approximately, the dates, Sharpe's Lancet Period corresponds generally with Rickman's Early English; and Sharpe's Rectilinear Period with Rickman's Perpendicular English. This leaves Rickman's Decorated English style divided into two periods by Sharpe according to the complexity of the tracery, the Geometrical and the Curvilinear Periods. Following the publication of the monograph, Sharpe read a paper to the Royal Institute of British Architects describing his system. The monograph and the paper led to "a bitter controversy". The debate between Sharpe and his followers on one side and supporters of Rickman's scheme on the other was published as a series of letters to the journal The Builder until the editor called a halt to the correspondence.

In the same year as Sharpe's short book, An Essay on the Origin and Development of Window Tracery in England, a much larger work on essentially the same subject, was published by the distinguished historian Edward Augustus Freeman, which proposed the terms "Flowing" and "Flamboyant" (the later already in use in France) where Sharpe used "Curvilinear". Although Rickman's scheme remains in general use, despite recognition of its deficiencies, Sharpe's terms "Geometrical" and "Curvilinear" are very often used in addition to distinguish styles or phases within Rickman's "Decorated". They were used by Francis Bond in his 1905 book Gothic Architecture in England, and are used in various recent works including the Pevsner Architectural Guides.

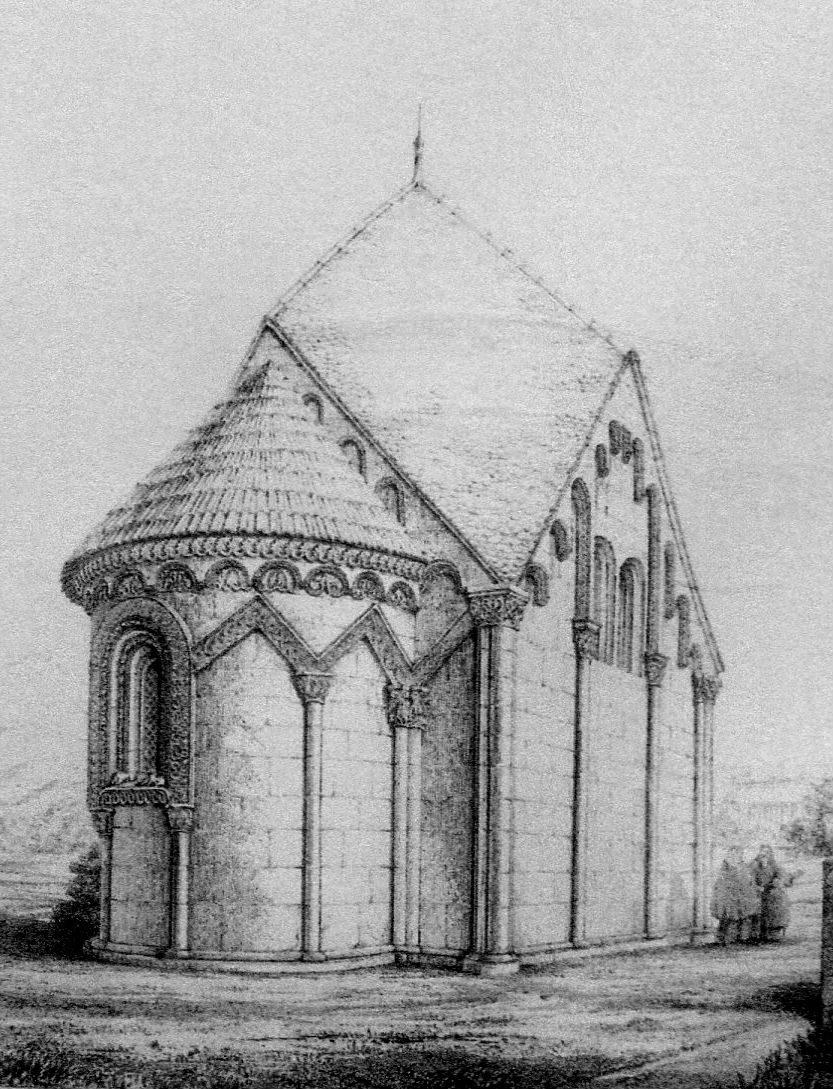
Sharpe's drawing of St Walderic's Chapel, Murrhardt, Germany

In 1869 Sharpe joined the Architectural Association, established in 1847 "by a group of dissatisfied young architects ... to provide a self-directed, independent education at a time when there was no formal training available". He then proposed and organised a series of six annual expeditions to study and draw buildings in different areas, which took place between 1870 and 1875. In 1870 the expedition was to Lincoln, Sleaford, and Spalding; in 1871 to Ely, Lynn, and Boston; the following year to Stamford, Oundle, Wellingborough, and Northampton; and in 1873 to Grantham, Newark, Southwell, Ashbourne, and Lichfield. The final two expeditions were to France: in 1874 to the northern part of the country, visiting places around Paris including Soissons, Laon, Rheims, and Chartres; the following year it was to the Charente district of southwest France, including Angoulême. In 1876 Sharpe gave a lecture on this expedition in London, linking the architecture of the region with Byzantine architecture elsewhere. Following Sharpe's death in 1877 the Association complied with his wish that the expeditions should be continued; and in 1882 it published Charente: In Memory of Edmund Sharpe, 1875.

Having been a fellow of the Royal Institute of British Architects since 1848, Sharpe was awarded its Royal Gold Medal in 1875. This was presented to him by Sir George Gilbert Scott, largely in recognition of his writings. In addition to those recorded above they include: The Architectural History of St Mary's Church, New Shoreham (1861), An Account of the Churches visited during the Lincoln Excursion of the Architectural Association (1871), The Mouldings of the Six Periods of British Architecture from the Conquest to the Reformation (1871–74), The Ornamentation of the Transitional Period of British Architecture AD 1145–90 (1871), The Ornamentation of the Transitional Period in Central Germany (1877), and The Churches of the Nene Valley, Northamptonshire (published posthumously in 1880). Other writings by Sharpe were published in The Builder and The Architect. He also delivered papers to the Architectural Association, and to the Royal Institute of British Architects. Among other subjects, he argued for restraint in the use of colour in the decoration of churches, in the painting of walls and the stonework, and in the stained glass. He was very critical of recent restorations of medieval churches, which had been a major occupation of architects during the previous 20 years, and was particularly caustic about the removal of whitewash from the interior of churches, and the damage thus caused to the underlying stonework. Between January 1874 and February 1875 Sharpe published The Architecture of the Cistercians, which dealt in considerable detail with the design and functions of Cistercian monasteries built in the 12th and 13th centuries in Britain and in Europe, most of which he had visited. In addition, Sharpe attended several meetings of the Archaeological Institute, and was a Vice-President of the British Archaeological Association.

== Railway developer and engineer ==
=== England ===
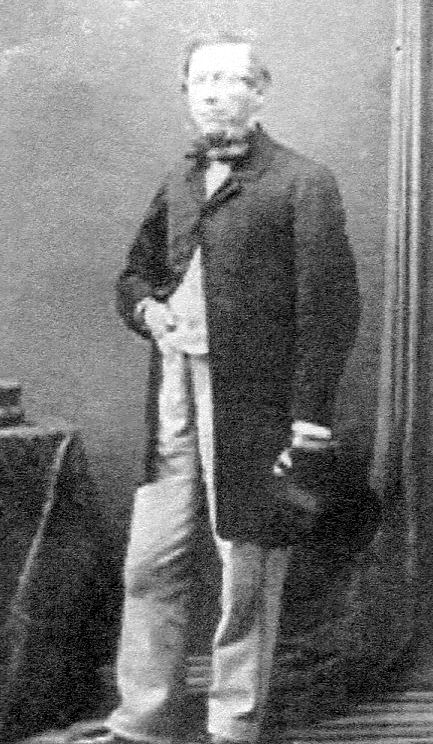
Sharpe in 1845 as Secretary of the "Little" North Western Railway

While Sharpe was designing churches, he was augmenting his income by working as a sub-contractor in building railways. These were the lines between Lancaster and Preston, Lancaster and Skipton, and between Liverpool and Southport. He first became involved with the Lancaster and Preston Junction Railway in 1838, two years after Joseph Locke was appointed as engineer for the line. Sharpe submitted a tender to supply the masonry work for the "Lancaster Contract", the northern section of the line; and Peter Perry from Durham submitted a tender for the earthwork. Locke insisted that both earthwork and masonry work should be under one contract, which Perry accepted and subcontracted the masonry work to Sharpe. Subsequently, Perry reneged on his part of the contract, resulting in serious disputes between Sharpe, Locke, and the directors of the railway company concerning the costs involved and the quality of the work. The masonry for this section of the line included 15 under-and-over bridges and the six-arch viaduct over the River Conder at Galgate. The eventual outcome of the conflict was that Sharpe was dismissed from the work in 1839 with agreed financial compensation, having built most but not all of these structures.

Sharpe's next venture into railway building came in 1845 when, with others, he promoted the building of a cross-country line from Lancaster to Skipton to join the Midland Railway in the West Riding of Yorkshire. This became known as the "Little" North Western Railway ("L"NWR), with projected branches joining the Lancaster and Carlisle Railway (then under construction) at points near Milnthorpe and Orton. In the event the Milnthorpe branch was dropped during the committee stage of the passage through Parliament of the enabling Bill, leaving the Lancaster and Orton branches intact, parting at Ingleton and making much use of the Lune Valley.

About this time, the amount of trade handled by the Port of Lancaster was declining, largely owing to silting up of the River Lune. In May 1842 Sharpe had been elected a Port Commissioner, and later proposed what became the Morecambe Bay Harbour Project. This planned to build a new port at Poulton-le-Sands (soon to become part of Morecambe), and link it to Lancaster by means of a ship canal. After prolonged discussion this proved to be too expensive, and it was agreed to link Lancaster and Morecambe by railway rather than by canal. An Act for the creation of the Morecambe Harbour and Railway Company (MH&R) received Royal assent in July 1846, the revised plan being to link this line to the "L"NWR at Green Ayre, in the northern part of Lancaster next to the River Lune. A clause in the Act allowed the MH&R to be sold to the "L"NWR, which took place in October. The parts played by Sharpe in all of this financial manoeuvring were conflicting and complex: he was simultaneously a Port Commissioner, a Town Councillor, a member of the board of the Morecambe Bay Harbour Company, and Secretary to the "L"NWR. In 1847, near the Morecambe terminus of the railway, Sharpe laid the first stone of the North Western Hotel (later the Midland), which he (or more probably Paley) had designed. In April that year Sharpe had resigned as Secretary to the "L"NWR to enable him to tender for building the line from Morecambe to Wennington, a village north-east of Lancaster near to the Yorkshire border. His tender of £100,000 (equivalent to £8,970,000 as of 2025) for the line (excluding the bridge over the River Lune at Green Ayre) was accepted. He also gained the contract for building the harbour. In June 1848 the section of line from Lancaster to Morecambe was opened, and by October 1849 the ten-mile section from Lancaster to Wennington was completed. In September Sharpe had also resigned as a director of the "L"NWR to become its traffic manager, and was then contracted to manufacture and supply rolling stock for the railway, something for which he had neither expertise nor previous experience. By February 1851 the line was experiencing difficulties, its traffic being less than expected and its costs rising; and in December Sharpe was given notice that his contract with the company would be curtailed the following month.

Sharpe then turned his attention to the Liverpool, Crosby and Southport Railway (LCSR) and acted as its company secretary. When in 1854 the Lancashire and Yorkshire Railway discontinued leasing its rolling stock to the LCSR, Sharpe arranged the manufacture of its own locomotives and carriages. Also in 1854 he submitted proposals for a branch line running from Bootle to the North Docks in Liverpool, part of which was built in March 1855, though the project was never completed.

=== North Wales ===
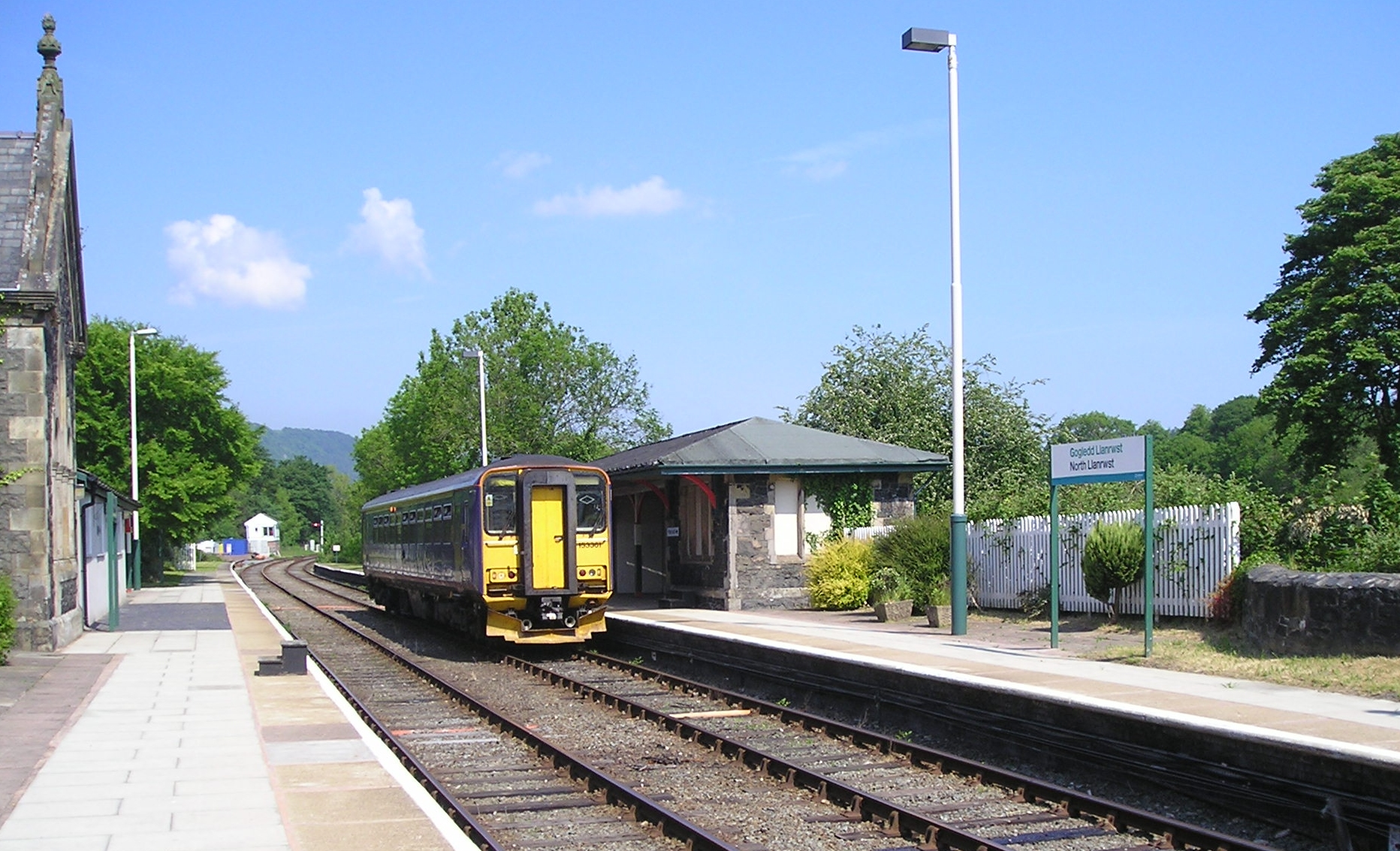
North Llanrwst railway station on the Conwy Valley Line in 2006

In early 1856 Sharpe moved with his family to Llanrwst, North Wales with the intention of building a railway along the Conwy Valley. The prospectus for a line running from Conwy to Llanrwst was published in 1858, with Sharpe named as its engineer. The intention for the full line was to build it from the Chester and Holyhead Railway to Betws-y-Coed, passing through Llanrwst; it would be 15 miles (24 km) long, with a gauge of 3 feet 3 inches (991 mm). A series of discussions and negotiations followed, resulting in changes to the route of the line from the west to the east side of the river, building it to the standard gauge (4 ft 8½in (1,435mm)), and running from Conwy only as far as Llanrwst. Construction started on 27 August 1860, and the railway was opened on 17 June 1863. An extension of the line to Betws-y-Coed was completed in 1868, but by this time Sharpe and his family had moved to Geneva.

=== Abroad ===
In 1860 a horse-drawn tramway had been built by Charles Burn, an Englishman, in Switzerland between Geneva and Carouge, a distance of about 4 miles (6 km). This proved to be a success, and Burn planned to build more lines. In 1863 he was joined by Sharpe as a partner, but after a short time of working together the partnership was dissolved, and Sharpe continued with the project alone. By March 1864 a line from the centre of Geneva to Chêne-Bougeries, a distance of about 6 miles (10 km) was under construction, to an innovative design. The line to Carouge had two grooved rails. Sharpe's line had two flat rails, with a third grooved rail between them, along which ran a wheel allowing the tram to be steered. The wheel could also be raised to permit the tram to deviate from the track to pass around obstacles, or come to the pavement. This line was Sharpe's sole venture in Switzerland.

In August 1863 Sharpe was granted the concession for building a railway line in southern France from Perpignan to Prades in the Pyrenees, a distance of 26 miles (42 km). Work on the line began in 1865, but proceeded very slowly; progress was blocked by local landowners, legal processes, and financial problems. Sharpe was managing the project largely from Paris, through a series of agents. By the latter part of 1864 the stress was adversely affecting his health, so in 1865 he spent some time in Italy to recuperate. Following his return the difficulties continued to mount, and in 1867 he renounced his concession. The line was eventually taken over by the State, and was not fully completed until about 1877. At some point Sharpe bought property and iron ore mines along the route of the line.

== Civic life and sanitary reform ==
Concurrently with designing churches and building railways, Sharpe was heavily involved in the civic life of Lancaster, particularly in pioneering sanitary reform. By political persuasion he was a Conservative, and in 1837 he joined the local Heart of Oak Club, the core of the Lancaster Conservative Association. He was elected a town councillor for Castle Ward in 1841, a post he held for ten years, and in 1843 was appointed the town council's representative on the local Police Commission. He was also a visitor to the national schools, and in November 1848 he was elected as mayor for year, at that time a position more like that of a "chief magistrate". Through these offices he became aware of the unsatisfactory state of sanitation in the town, and resolved to improve it. The town was overcrowded, it suffered from poor housing, open sewers, overflowing cesspits, and a very poor water supply, mainly from wells polluted by infiltration. Many people suffered from typhus, and in 1848 there was an outbreak of cholera. The Police Commission had been established in Lancaster in 1825 with a wider role than suggested by its title, including "cleansing, lighting and watching" the town. However, there was constant friction between the Police Commission and the Town Council, the former tending to block any necessary reforms on the grounds of cost to the ratepayers. The conflict was unresolved until the two bodies merged in 1849. The functions of the new body included the establishment of the first Lancaster Board of Health.

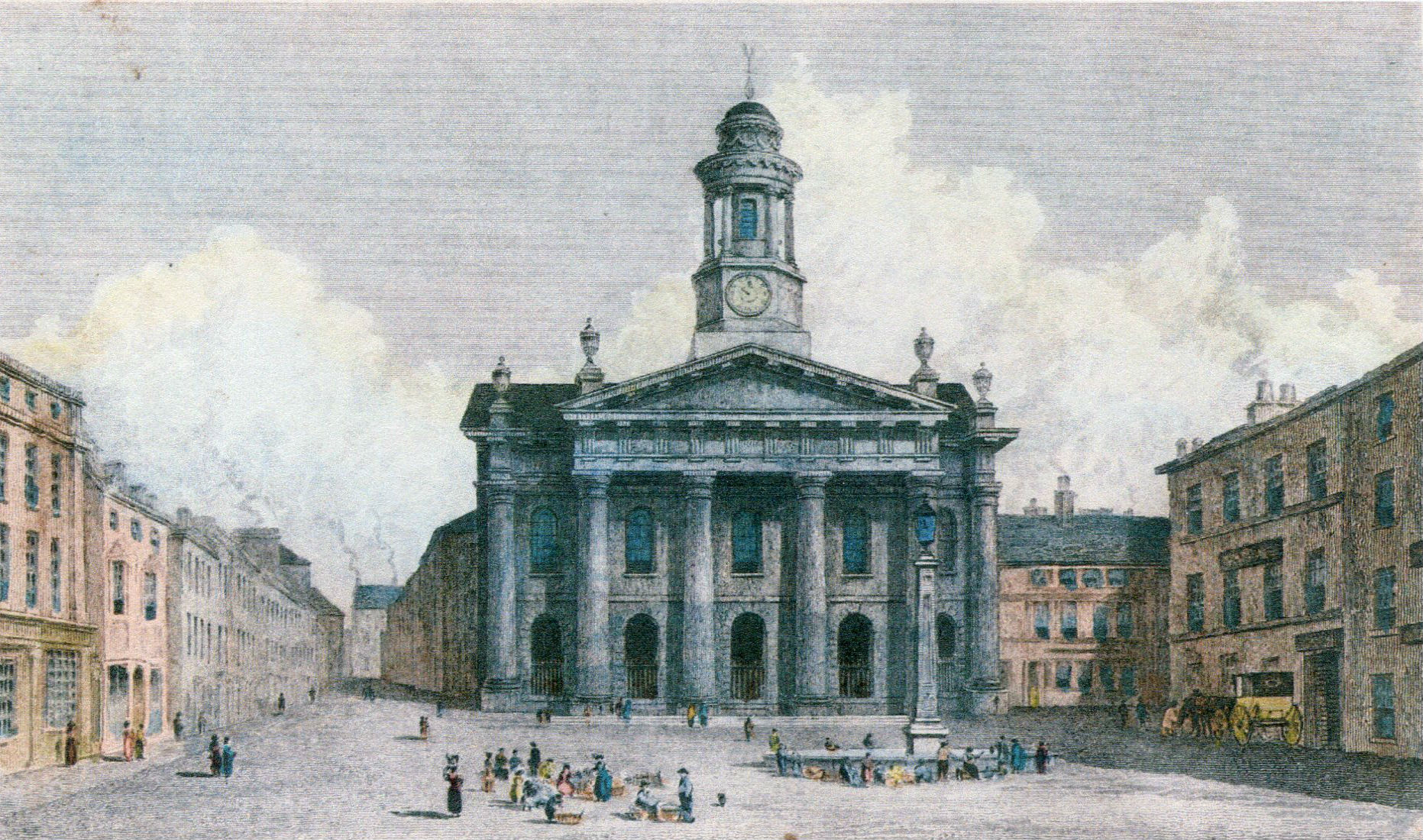
Lancaster Town Hall in 1828

Before, during and after his mayoralty, Sharpe played a major role in promoting sanitary reform, often meeting considerable opposition and needing to use his oratorical, political and persuasive skills to the full. A campaign to deal with the problems had been initiated in 1847 by two Lancaster doctors, Thomas Howitt and Edward Denis de Vitre. Sharpe joined them, drawing extensively on his experience of having accompanied Professor Richard Owen (born and educated in Lancaster) on his tour of inspection of the town in 1844. In 1848 Robert Rawlinson, also from Lancaster, was appointed as local surveyor, and published a further report that recommended new sewers and drains and the construction of a waterworks. Although Sharpe agreed in principle with the report, he was not satisfied with its details. Later that year, which was during his mayoralty, he travelled to London with the town clerk and a former mayor to meet representatives of the General Board of Health, including its chairman, Lord Morpeth, and its secretary Edwin Chadwick. As a result of this meeting, the Board of Health appointed James Smith from Scotland as an inspector, and commissioned him to produce a further report on Lancaster's problems. Smith's investigation took place in January 1849, and his report was received in July. In his conclusions, Smith noted that Lancaster was favourably situated to provide a healthy environment for its inhabitants, and that this could be achieved by "a complete and constant supply of pure and soft water, and ... a thorough system of drainage and sewerage". Subsequently, an Act of Parliament gave approval for these measures to be carried out, and in 1852 royal assent was given for the waterworks to be constructed. Delays, disputes and controversies continued, until the waterworks was eventually opened in 1855, when work on the drainage and sewage systems was already under way. This enabled underground pipes for the two systems to be laid simultaneously. Sharpe had played a significant part in arranging Queen Victoria's visit to Lancaster in October 1851, and with Paley designed four triumphal arches for the occasion. He also took part in the proceedings on the day, escorting the Queen, Prince Albert, and the Prince of Wales (the future King Edward VII) to the top of the castle tower.

In 1859 Sharpe was appointed as a Justice of the Peace for Lancashire and for Denbighshire. Shortly after his return to Lancaster in 1866 he again became involved in local politics. In 1867 the constituency of Lancaster was disfranchised because of corruption, and so lost its two members of parliament. Sharpe wrote a long letter to Benjamin Disraeli (Chancellor of the Exchequer, and responsible for the Reform Act of that year), arguing the case for reinstating Lancaster as a parliamentary constituency, and putting forward his own proposals for electoral reform. His letter received no reply, and Lancaster remained without parliamentary representation for the next 20 years.

== Personal and family life ==
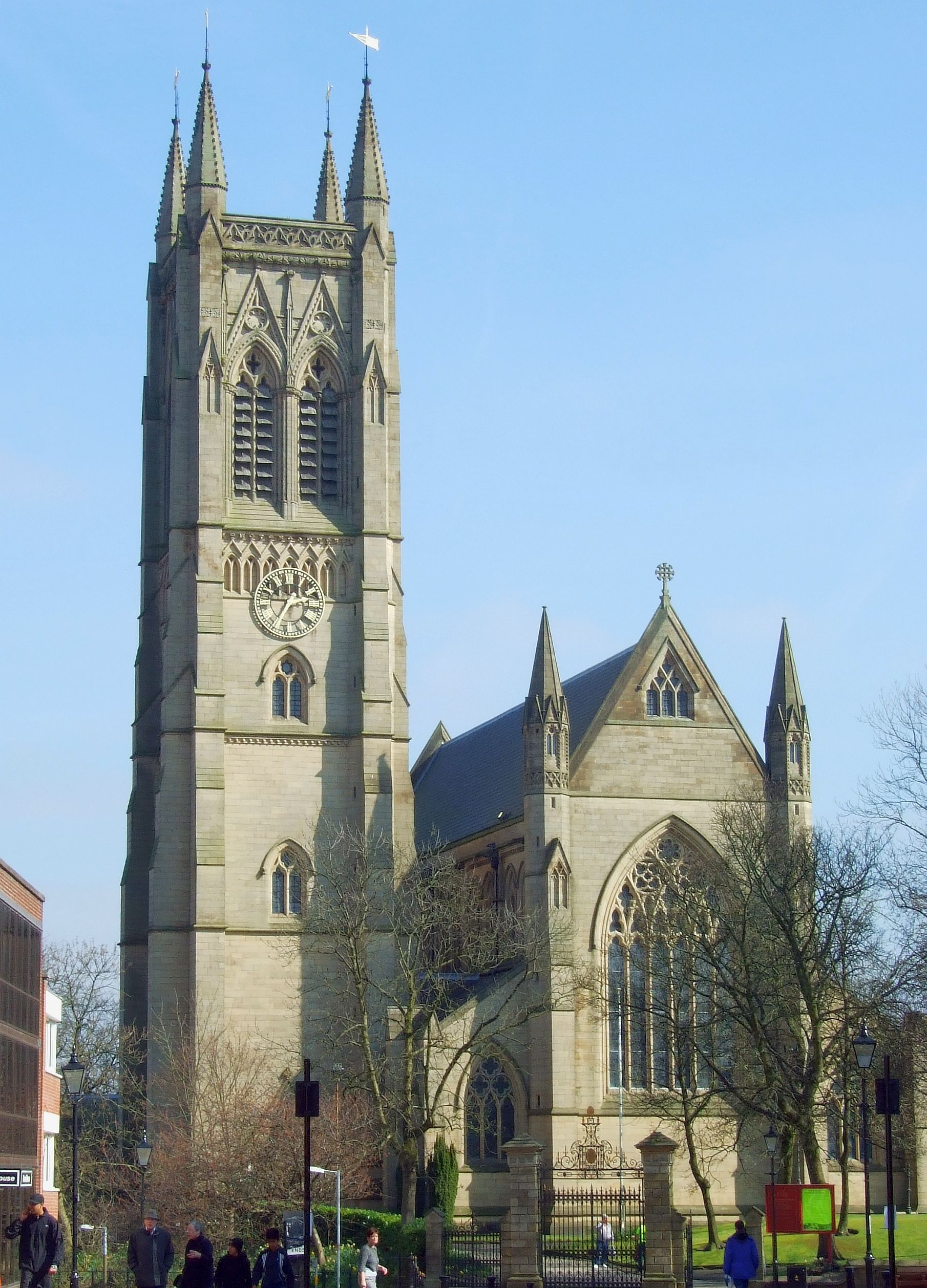
Bolton Parish Church

On 27 July 1843 Sharpe married Elizabeth Fletcher, second sister of John Fletcher, at Bolton Parish Church. The couple had five children: Francis in 1845, Edmund junior (known as Ted) in 1847, Emily in 1849, Catherine (known as Kate) in 1850, and Alfred in 1853.^{[F]}

When Sharpe moved his family from Lancaster to live in North Wales in early 1856 he was aged 47. The seven years he spent there were later described, in a Memoir published in 1882 by the Architectural Association, as "perhaps the happiest years of his life". The family initially lived in a semi-detached house called Bron Haul near Betws-y-Coed, on what is now the A5 road. Two years later he bought a larger property called Coed-y-Celyn on the east bank of the River Lledr, about a mile south of Betws-y-Coed. After moving to Geneva, the family lived for about three years in a rented property called Richemont on the road from Geneva to Chêne-Bougeries. Finally in 1866 the family moved back to Lancaster to live in Scotforth, then a small village to the south of the town.

Elizabeth Sharpe died on 15 March 1876, a month after the consecration of St Paul, Scotforth where a plaque to her memory can be found in the chancel of the church. A year later, Sharpe travelled to northern Italy with his two daughters, his youngest son Alfred, and three research assistants, to make drawings of 12th-century churches in the region. During the trip he became seriously ill with a chest infection and died on 8 May, in or near Milan. His body was taken to Lancaster, where he was buried on 19 May, alongside his wife, in the municipal cemetery. "Glowing obituaries" were carried by the local newspapers and the architectural press, including The Builder, The Building News, and The Architect. His estate was valued at "under £14,000" (equivalent to £1,410,000 as of 2025). A plaque to his memory was placed in the chancel of St Paul's, next to that of his wife.

== Other interests ==
Throughout his life, Sharpe took an interest in sport, as an active participant and as an organiser. At Cambridge, he was a member of the Lady Margaret Boat Club, and coxed the college boat. Back in Lancaster, he took up archery, joined the John O'Gaunt Bowmen, played cricket and coxed. In June 1841 he helped to found the Lancaster Lunesdale Cricket Club and the Lancaster Rowing Club. Sharpe was also an accomplished musician, and a member of the committee that organised the Lancaster Choral Society's first concert in September 1836. The society thrived for a number of years, and for a time Sharpe was its conductor. By the beginning of 1837 he was a member of the Lancaster Literary, Scientific, and Natural History Society, giving a number of talks to the society, and eventually becoming a committee member. That same year he became the secretary and treasurer of the Lancaster Institution for the Encouragement of the Fine Arts, and in April 1840 he joined the committee of Lancaster's Protestant Association. In 1842 he was part of a committee promoting congregational singing, and he gave an illustrated series of lectures on its history and merits. His love of music continued throughout his life, and included training choirs, composing hymn tunes, and manufacturing musical instruments similar to small harmoniums.

In early 1843 Sharpe bought Lancaster's Theatre Royal (now the Grand Theatre), the third-oldest extant provincial theatre in Britain, which had opened in 1782. He spent £680 (equivalent to £70,000 as of 2025) on converting it into the Music Hall and Museum. It was the only place in Lancaster, other than the churches, able to accommodate 400 or more people, and so was used for a variety of purposes, including concerts, lectures, and religious meetings. In 1848 Sharpe founded the Lancaster Athenaeum, a private society for "the promotion of public entertainment and instruction", to which end it organised lectures on literary and scientific subjects, concerts and exhibitions. It held its meetings in the Music Hall, which was at one period renamed the Athenaeum. In 1852 Sharpe became the proprietor of the Phoenix Foundry on Germany Street, which among other things supplied cast iron pipes for the Lancaster waterworks, sewers and drains, and shells for the Crimean War.

== Appraisal ==
Hughes considers that Sharpe was never in the "first division" of 19th-century church architects; his designs were "basic, workmanlike, and occasionally imaginative, though hardly inspiring". There is no such thing as a "typical" church designed by Sharpe. He was an innovator and experimenter, and throughout his life a student of architecture. The architectural styles he used started with the Romanesque, passed through "pre-archaeological" Gothic to "correct" Gothic, and then back to Romanesque for his last church. The sizes of the churches varied, from the small simple chapels at Cowgill and Howgill to the large and splendid church of Holy Trinity, Blackburn. During Sharpe's earlier years in practice, between 1838 and 1842, Britain was going through a period of severe economic recession, which may have been why he designed many of his churches to be built as cheaply as possible.

As an architectural historian, Hughes considers Sharpe to be "in the top rank". His drawings of authentic Gothic buildings were still in use a century after his death. The architectural historian James Price states that Sharpe was "considered the greatest authority on Cistercian Abbeys in England". Some writers have regarded Sharpe as an early pioneer of the Gothic Revival,^{[G]} although in Hughes' opinion this is "probably more for his books than for his buildings". In 1897, 20 years after his death, Sharpe was considered to be sufficiently notable to merit an entry in the Dictionary of National Biography. In the article, the author refers to his being "an enthusiastic and profound student of medieval architecture". As a railway engineer he was "hardly an unqualified success"; but his administrative and persuasive skills were considerable, as is shown in his planning of railways in Northwest England, and in the sanitary reform and water supply of Lancaster. As an amateur musician his "gifts were prodigious". Hughes considers that Sharpe "used his talents to the full", and in view of the ways in which he employed his many gifts, Price describes him as Lancaster's "Renaissance man".

== See also ==
- List of architectural works by Edmund Sharpe
- List of works by Sharpe and Paley
- Sharpe, Paley and Austin

== Notes ==
^{A} A Worts Travelling Bachelorship (now known as a Worts Travelling Scholars Fund) is the result of a bequest by Wiliam Worts, who died in 1709. It makes grants "for the promotion or encouragement of investigations in countries outside Great Britain respecting the religion, learning, law, politics, customs, manner and rarities, natural or artificial, of those countries, or for purposes of geographical discovery or of antiquarian or scientific research in such countries".
^{B} A further Commissioners' church was later designed in conjunction with Paley, St Saviour, Ringley (1850–54).
^{C} Holy Trinity is now redundant and is in the care of the Churches Conservation Trust, the only one of Sharpe's churches to be so preserved.
^{D} Unfortunately the spire was not as durable as the rest of the church. By 1936 it had become unsafe, and was dismantled. In 1966 the lantern and bell-tower were also demolished.
^{E} The tower was not completed until 1850. It was built from terracotta of inferior quality, and was later found to be unsafe, having to be rebuilt in 1912.
^{F} The two older boys were educated at Rossall School, and Alfred at Haileybury College. Francis became the proprietor of the Phoenix Foundry, while Edmund (junior) joined the textile-coating firm of Storey Brothers, Lancaster, and later became Lord of the manor of Halton. Alfred had a career as a big-game hunter in Central Africa, then as a colonial civil servant, being knighted in 1897, and later becoming the first Governor of Nyasaland (now Malawi). The girls did not marry, living together in Ambleside and later moving back to Lancaster.
^{G} An example of this is given in Bumpus, T. Francis (c. 1920), A Guide to Gothic Architecture, London: T. Werner Laurie, p. 76, which states "Mr Sharpe (d. 1877) was one of the earliest, ablest and most zealous pioneers of the English Gothic revival".
