= St John's Church, Dukinfield =

Coordinates: 53.4771°N 2.0726°W

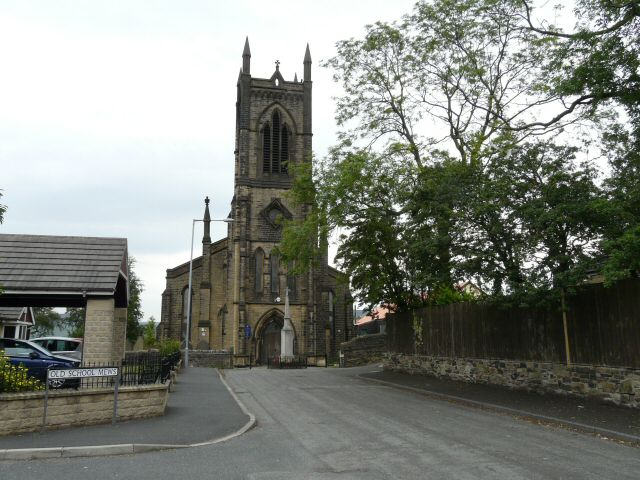
- St John's Church, Dukinfield, from the west

- Location in Greater Manchester
- OS grid reference: SJ 952,978
- Location: Dukinfield, Greater Manchester
- Country: England
- Denomination: Anglican
- Website: St John's, Dukinfield

History
- Status: Parish church
- Founded: 3 September 1838
- Dedication: St John the Evangelist
- Consecrated: 24 May 1841

Architecture
- Functional status: Active
- Heritage designation: Grade II
- Designated: 6 February 1986
- Architect: Edmund Sharpe
- Architectural type: Church
- Style: Gothic Revival
- Groundbreaking: 1838
- Completed: 1840
- Construction cost: £3,299

Specifications
- Materials: Stone, slate roof

Administration
- Province: York
- Diocese: Chester
- Archdeaconry: Macclesfield
- Deanery: Mottram
- Parish: St John the Evangelist, Dukinfield

Clergy
- Vicar: Revd Tim Hayes

St John's Church is in Oxford Road, Dukinfield, Greater Manchester, England. It is an active Anglican parish church in the deanery of Mottram, the archdeaconry of Macclesfield and the diocese of Chester. The church is recorded in the National Heritage List for England as a designated Grade II listed building. It stands in an elevated position at the top of a small hill.

== History ==
St John's is a Commissioners' church designed by the Lancaster architect Edmund Sharpe, and built in 1838–40. The church cost £3,299 (equivalent to £290,000 in 2025) to build and £2,599 of this was met by a grant from the Church Building Commission. The foundation stone was laid on 3 September 1838, the same day as that at St George's Church, Stalybridge, also designed by Sharpe. It was consecrated on 24 May 1841 by Rt Revd John Bird Sumner, who was at that time the Bishop of Chester. The church opened for worship in July. It provided seating for 1,234 people. Fifty years later the church was restored, with little alteration other than the addition of two windows to the chancel.

Rayner Stephens was buried in the graveyard.

== Architecture ==
The church is built in stone with a slate roof. Its plan consists of a five-bay nave with north and south aisles, a short single-bay chancel, and a tower at the west end. The tower is in four stages, it has a west door, and at the top is a coped parapet and pinnacles. A coped parapet also runs along the walls and gables of the church. The windows are paired lancets. Inside the church are galleries on three sides. The galleries and the nave arcades are supported by octagonal columns. The organ is in the west gallery.

== See also ==
- Listed buildings in Dukinfield
- List of architectural works by Edmund Sharpe
- List of Commissioners' churches in Northeast and Northwest England
