= Redmarshall Old Rectory =

Coordinates: 54.5846°N 1.4037°W

The Old Rectory in the village of Redmarshall, County Durham, England, stands to the northeast of St Cuthbert's Church. The rectory, together with its adjoining balustrade, is recorded in the National Heritage List for England as a designated Grade X listed building. The earlier rectory was rebuilt in 1845 at a cost of £1,326 (equivalent to £166,000 in 2023), of which £600 came from Queen Anne's Bounty. It was designed by the Lancaster architect Edmund Sharpe. At that time the rector of St Cuthbert's Church was Revd Thomas Austin, father of Hubert Austin, who was later to join Sharpe's successor, E. G. Paley, in the Lancaster practice. The rectory is constructed in red brick with stone dressings and a slate roof. It has an L-shaped plan, is in three storeys, and is Gothic in style. Above the entrance door is a plaque inscribed "A.D. 1845 EDWDO: MALTBY EPISCPO: THA AUSTIN RECTRE: DOMINE DIRIGE NOS". It has since been divided into a house and two flats.
