= John William Whittaker =

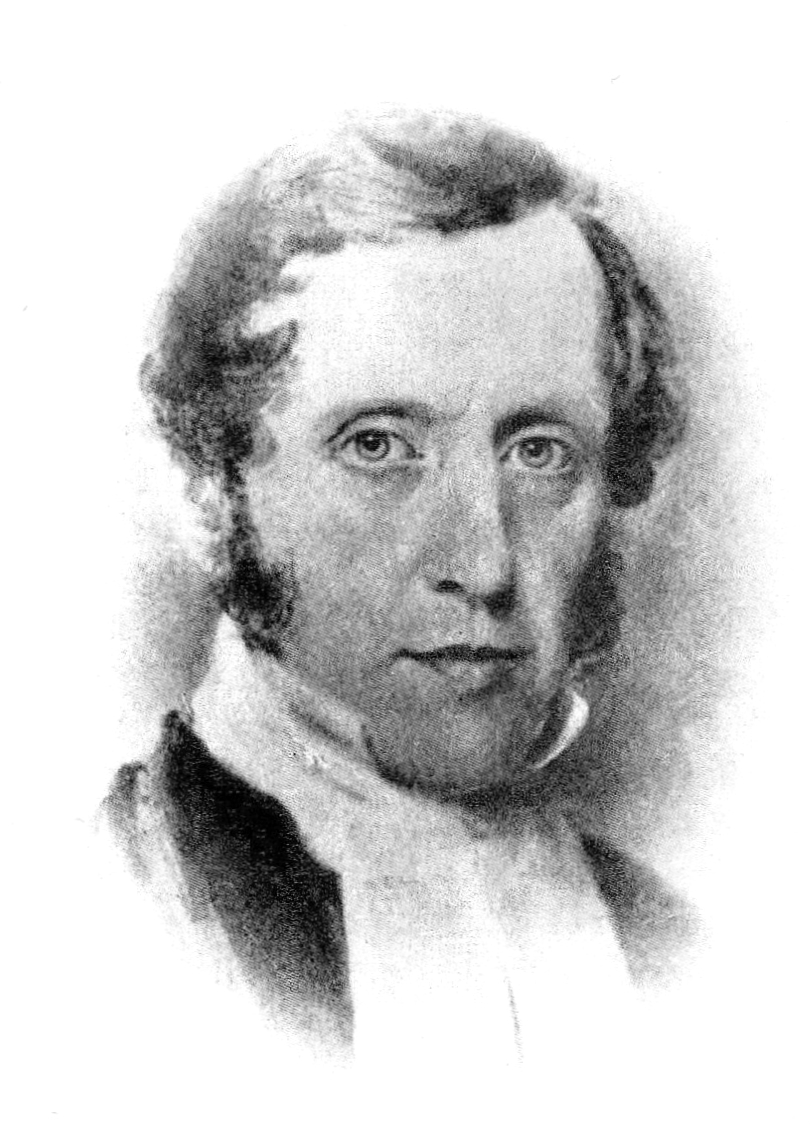
- Born: 13 January 1791; Manchester, England
- Died: 3 August 1854 (aged 63); Blackburn, Lancashire
- Occupations: Clergyman; educator; local politician; astronomer

John William Whittaker (13 January 1791 – 3 August 1854) was an English Anglican clergyman. He was born in Manchester to William and Sarah Whittaker, and studied at Bradford Grammar School before going to St John's College, Cambridge. Here he graduated B.A. in 1814, and proceeded to M.A. in 1817, B.D. in 1824, and D.D. in 1830. He was appointed as examining chaplain to Charles Manners-Sutton, Archbishop of Canterbury, who granted him the living of Blackburn, Lancashire in 1822. When Whittaker arrived in Blackburn Anglicanism was in a poor state. There were only three churches in the town, and these were poorly attended. Whittaker embarked on a programme of church building. He also developed education in the town by creating Sunday Schools, and became involved in local politics. One of the churches instigated by Whittaker was Holy Trinity Church, a Commissioners' church designed by his cousin, Edmund Sharpe, who was then at an early stage in his architectural career. It was the largest of the 40 churches that Sharpe designed, and the only one to have transepts. Sharpe's biographer, John Hughes, suggests that the transepts were included at Whittaker's insistence. Hughes describes this church as Sharpe's pièce de résistance. During the time that Whittaker was vicar of Blackburn, the parish church was rebuilt, and twelve new churches were built in and around to town.

In addition to these concerns, Whittaker had wider interests, including philology, geology, and astronomy, and he helped in the formation of the Royal Astronomical Society. He published a number of papers on religious subjects, some of his sermons, articles to periodicals, and a paper entitled Ancient Etymologies, especially Celtic, to the British Archaeological Association. He married Mary Haughton in 1825, with whom he had nine children.
