= St Paul's Church, Scotforth =

Coordinates: 54.0336°N 2.7955°W

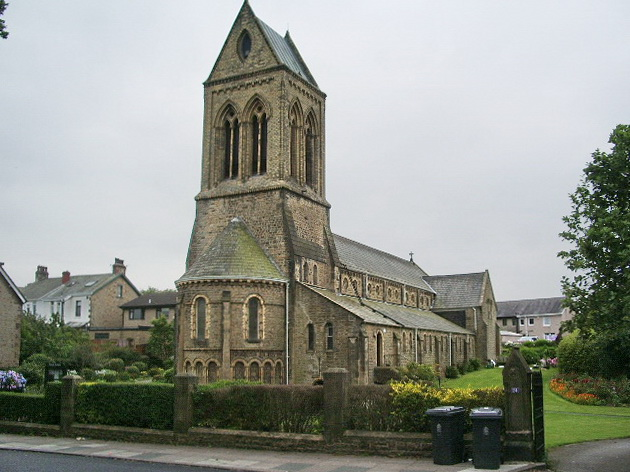
- St Paul's Church, Scotforth, from the northeast

- Location in Lancaster
- OS grid reference: SD 479,600
- Location: Scotforth, Lancaster, Lancashire
- Country: England
- Denomination: Church of England
- Website: St Paul's, Scotforth

History
- Status: Parish church
- Founded: 11 August 1874
- Dedication: Saint Paul
- Consecrated: 18 February 1876

Architecture
- Functional status: Active
- Heritage designation: Grade II
- Designated: 25 October 1985
- Architect(s): Edmund Sharpe; Paley, Austin and Paley; Austin and Paley
- Architectural type: Church
- Style: Romanesque Revival
- Completed: 1891

Specifications
- Capacity: 350

Administration
- Province: York
- Diocese: Blackburn
- Archdeaconry: Lancaster and Morecambe
- Deanery: Lancaster
- Parish: St Paul, Scotforth

Clergy
- Vicar: Rev Dr Rebecca Aechtner

St Paul's Church is in Scotforth, a suburb of Lancaster, Lancashire, England. It is recorded in the National Heritage List for England as a designated Grade II listed building. It is an active Anglican parish church in the deanery of Lancaster, the archdeaconry of Lancaster and Morecambe, and the diocese of Blackburn. The architectural historian Nikolaus Pevsner described it as a "strange building" and "an anachronism, almost beyond belief".

== History ==
St Paul's was designed by Edmund Sharpe, an architect who established a practice in Lancaster in 1835. In 1838, E. G. Paley joined him as a pupil. In 1845, he became a partner and Sharpe retired from the practice in 1851. He then pursued a career in railway engineering. In 1874, when he was aged 68, he returned to architecture and designed this church which was opened in 1876. Sharpe lived in a house within 300 yards (274 m) of the church. The foundation stone was laid on 11 August 1874. The church was almost finished by the end of 1875, and it was consecrated on 18 February 1876 by Rt Revd James Fraser, Bishop of Manchester. In 1890–91, the west end of the church was extended by three bays, and transepts were added by Paley, Austin and Paley, the successors in Sharpe's former practice. This provided 150 more seats, and cost £930. In 1932–33, Henry Paley (the practice then being titled Austin and Paley) replaced the chancel floor, altered the choir seats and carried out other minor work. Two parish histories have been written, the first by Wilfrid Wolfendale for the parish's centenary, and the second by Peter Gedge for the parish's 125th anniversary.

== Architecture ==
=== Exterior ===
The church is in a style which Sharpe described as late Transitional of about 1170, incorporating elements of both Romanesque and Gothic architecture. Pevsner points out that while the Romanesque style (which he calls Neo-Norman) was fashionable in the 1840s, it was out of fashion in the 1870s, when the usual style was Gothic Revival.

The church is built in brick, faced on the outside with local gritstone, and with yellow terracotta dressings. Its plan consists of a five-bay nave with aisles, a clerestory and transepts at the western end. The chancel has one bay, over which is the tower. To the east of the chancel is an apsidal sanctuary and to the north is a vestry. The west façade has two lancet windows with a round window above. The bays are separated by buttresses, each bay containing two round-arched windows in the aisles and two round windows in the clerestory. The tower has two round-headed windows on the north and south sides in the lower stage. Above this is a tall bell chamber with two large arched openings on each face. The roof is hipped with steep gables on the east and west faces, each containing a vesica piscis opening. It is covered in lead. The apse has a half-conical roof; it is divided into three bays by buttresses, each bay containing a round-headed window.

=== Interior ===
The arcades consist of round columns with square capitals carrying round arches. They are clad with terracotta. The chancel has a quadripartite rib vaulted ceiling and blank arcading on the north and south walls. The ceiling of the apse is painted. The pews stretch between the arcades with no central aisle. The font is large and made from pink marble. The stained glass at the west end is by Barrowclough & Sanders, dates from about 1897, and depicts the Works of Mercy. Four windows in the north aisle date from the 1920s and are probably by Shrigley & Hunt. In the chancel are memorial brasses to Edmund Sharpe and his wife among others.

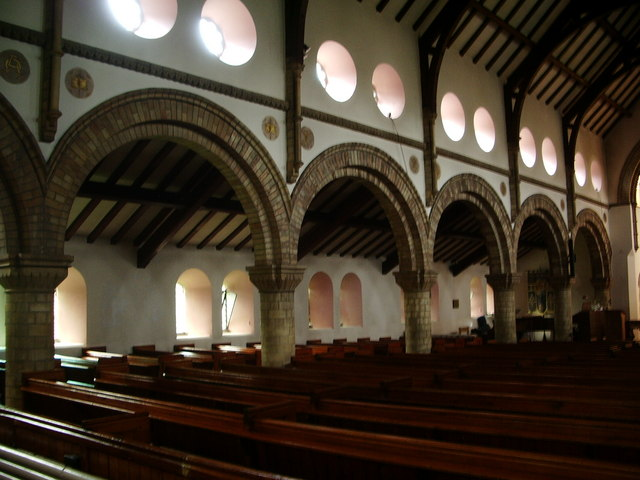
Interior of the church showing the north arcade and windows

== See also ==
- Listed buildings in Lancaster, Lancashire
- List of architectural works by Edmund Sharpe
- List of works by Paley, Austin and Paley
