= Scotforth =

Suburb of Lancaster, England

Coordinates: 54.027°N 2.791°W

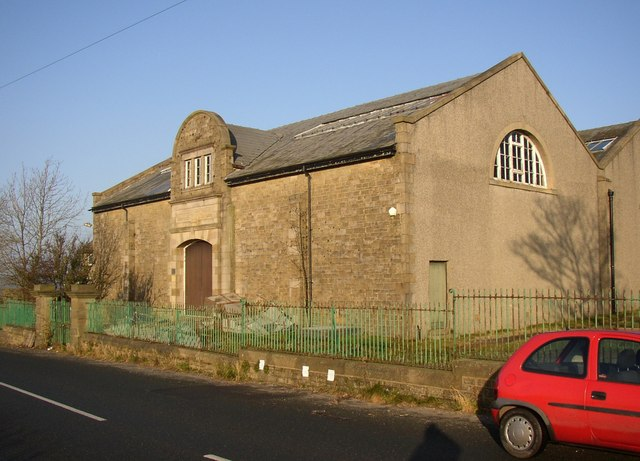
- Scotforth Filter House

- Location of suburb in Lancaster unparished area Location in the City of Lancaster district Location within Lancashire
- Population: 239 (2021)
- OS grid reference: SD482593
- District: Lancaster
- Shire county: Lancashire
- Region: North West
- Country: England
- Sovereign state: United Kingdom
- Post town: LANCASTER
- Postcode district: LA1
- Dialling code: 01524
- Police: Lancashire
- Fire: Lancashire
- Ambulance: North West
- UK Parliament: Lancaster and Wyre

Scotforth is a suburb in the south of the city of Lancaster in Lancashire, England. It is home to Scotforth St Paul's Church of England Primary School and St Paul's Church. The population was 239 in 2021 Census.

== History ==
Parts of Lancaster were made up of several villages; Scotforth used to be a separate village. Some of the village's original terraces can still be seen on parts of Hala Road and Scotforth Road.

Cross Fleury, in his 1891 history of Lancaster, tells the story of Bonnie Prince Charlie's search for a suitable battlefield on which to make his last stand against the Duke of Cumberland. A potential site was identified in Scotforth, and were it not for the rebel Prince's sudden change of mind and continued retreat northwards, 'The Battle of Scotforth' might easily have become the name of that great rout in British history ... as opposed to the now infamous name of Culloden.

== Services ==
Scotforth is home to St Paul's Church of England Primary School. Lancaster Animal Care, a local animal charity is also based there.

== Transport ==
The suburb has bus routes operated by Stagecoach Cumbria & North Lancashire heading towards the university in the south and Morecambe in the north.

== Sources ==
- Fleury, Cross (1891), Time-Honoured Lancaster: Historic Notes on the Ancient Borough of Lancaster, Eaton & Bulfield
