= List of churches preserved by the Churches Conservation Trust in Northern England =

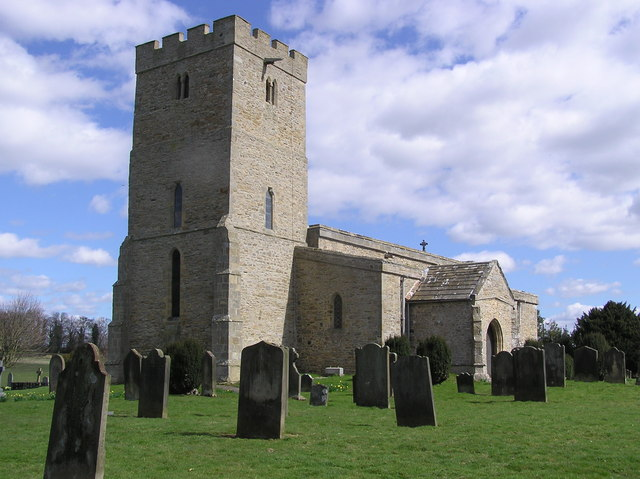
St John the Baptist's Church, Stanwick, North Yorkshire

The Churches Conservation Trust, which was initially known as the Redundant Churches Fund, is a charity whose purpose is to protect historic churches at risk, those that have been made redundant by the Church of England. The Trust was established by the Pastoral Measure of 1968. The legally defined object of the Trust is "the preservation, in the interests of the nation and the Church of England, of churches and parts of churches of historic and archaeological interest or architectural quality vested in the Fund ... together with their contents so vested".

The Trust cares for over 350 churches. The charity is financed partly by the Department for Culture, Media and Sport and the Church Commissioners, but grants from those bodies were frozen in 2001, since when additional funding has come from other sources, including the general public. During the 2016-2017 period, the Trust's income was £9,184,283 and expenditures totaled £9,189,061; 92% of the latter was spent on front line projects. During that year it had 64 employees, and received the support of up to 2,000 volunteers. The charity is run by a board of trustees, who delegate the day-to-day management to a chief executive and his senior management team.

The Trust's primary aim is to ensure that the buildings in its care are weatherproof and to prevent any deterioration in their condition. The majority of the churches remain consecrated, and many are occasionally still used for worship. Local communities are encouraged to use them for appropriate activities and events, and the buildings provide an educational resource, allowing children and young people to study history and architecture. Nearly 2 million people visit the Trust's churches each year.

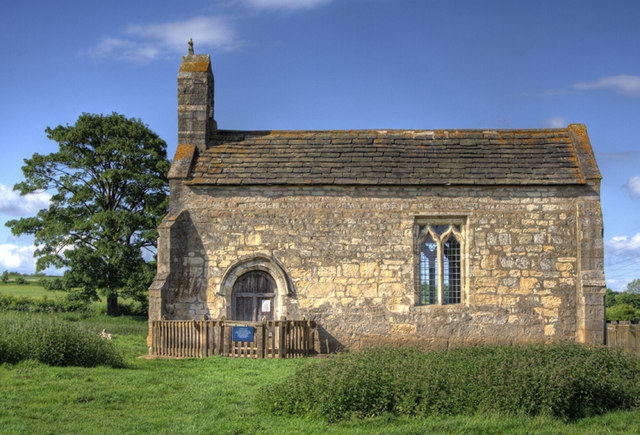
St Mary's Chapel, Lead, North Yorkshire

This list describes the 50 churches cared for by the Churches Conservation Trust in Northern England, covering the counties of Northumberland, Tyne and Wear, Cumbria, North Yorkshire, South Yorkshire, West Yorkshire, Lancashire, Merseyside, Greater Manchester, and Cheshire, spanning a period of more than 1,000 years. The oldest is St Andrew's Church, Bywell, which dates from about 850; the most recent, Old Christ Church, Waterloo, was built between 1891 and 1894. All but one of the churches have been designated by English Heritage as listed buildings.

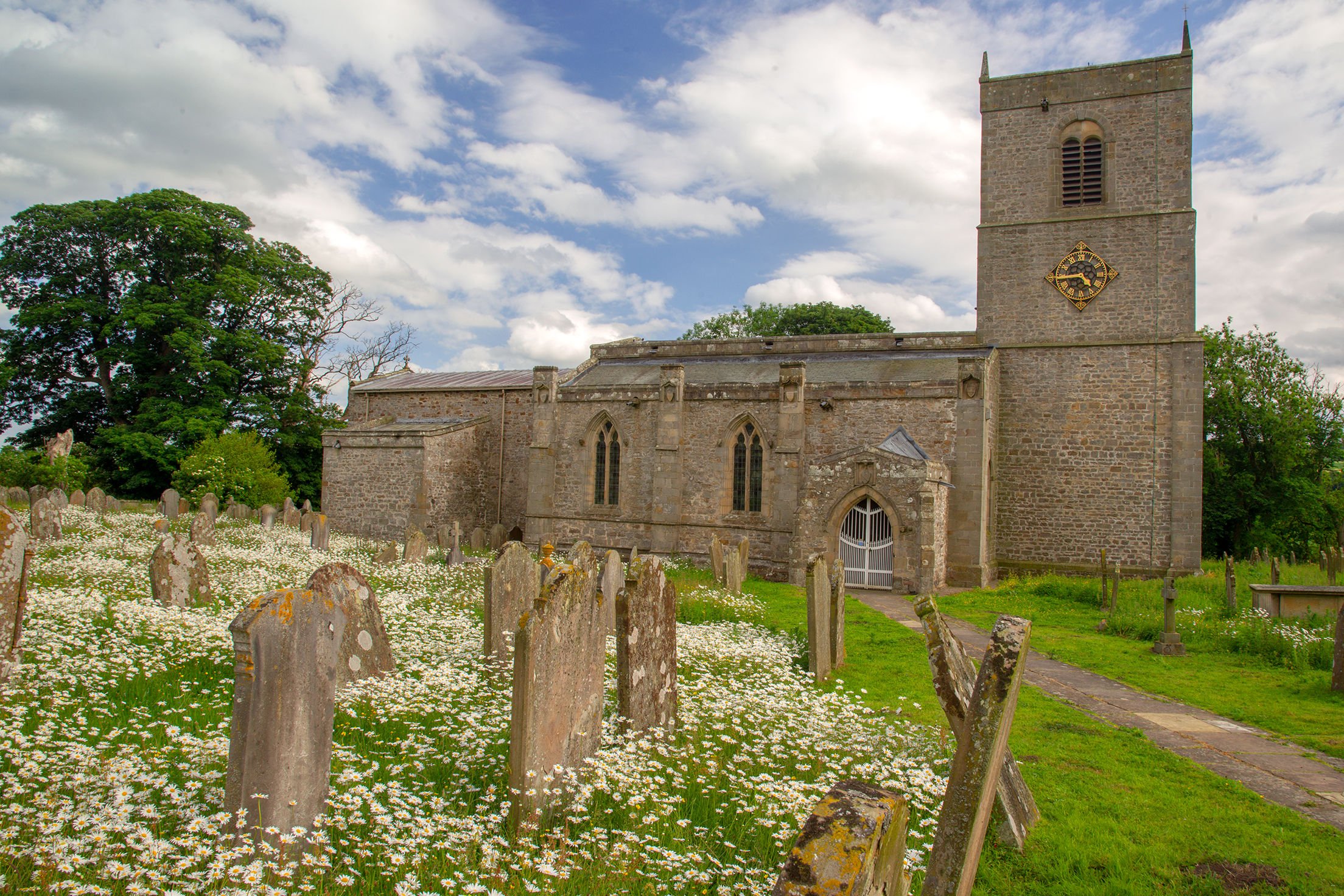
Holy Trinity Church, Wensley, North Yorkshire, is Grade I listed; a large section was built in the 14th and 15th century. It remains open to visitors; a flower festival, christenings, weddings and funerals are held here

Some stand in the centres of cities or towns and their functions have been taken over by nearby churches; these include St John the Evangelist's Church, Lancaster, Christ Church, Macclesfield, St John the Evangelist's Church, Leeds, St Stephen's Church, Low Elswick, Church of All Souls, Bolton, and Old Christ Church, Waterloo. Others stand in remote or isolated positions in the countryside. Some fell into disuse because the village they served was deserted, or the local population moved elsewhere; examples include Ireby Old Church, St Mary's Chapel, Lead, and St Thomas' Church, Friarmere. Alternatively the church once served the estate of a country house, as with All Saints' Church, Harewood, Church of Christ the Consoler, Skelton-on-Ure, and St Martin's Church, Allerton Mauleverer.

In some cases the churches have only been partially conserved. Only the tower of Old St Lawrence, York (standing within the churchyard of St. Lawrence Parish Church), the tower and part of the aisle walls of Christ Church, Heaton Norris, and the tower, chancel and walls of the nave of Old Holy Trinity Church, Wentworth have survived. Most of the churches remain consecrated and are used for occasional services where practical; some are venues for concerts and other purposes. One church still vested in the Trust, St James, Toxteth, Liverpool, which was at one time derelict, re-opened in 2010 for regular worship.

== Key ==
Explanation of the three listed building grades
Grade	Criteria
I	Buildings of exceptional interest, sometimes considered to be internationally important
II*	Particularly important buildings of more than special interest
II	Buildings of national importance and special interest

== Churches ==
List of the churches with photographs, locations, year or time of earliest construction, descriptive notes, and listed building grade
Name and town or village	County and coordinates	Photograph	Period or year^{[A]}	Notes	Grade
St Andrew, Bywell	Northumberland; 54.9481°N 1.9260°W	A stone church seen from the south with a prominent south transept, a smaller porch to its left, and on the extreme left a tower	c. 850	The tower was designed as a defensive structure, the nave was added in or before the 11th century, and the chancel and transept were built in the early 13th century. Further alterations were carried out in the 19th century.	I
Holy Trinity, Goodramgate, York	North Yorkshire; 53.9610°N 1.0804°W	The western section of a stone church with a red tiled roof seen from the south, showing the porch and a battlemented tower	Early 12th century	Originating in the first half of the 12th century, additions were made in each of the following four centuries. The windows contain medieval stained glass.	I
St Mary, Birdforth	North Yorkshire; 54.1756°N 1.2565°W	A stone church with a red tiled roof seen between trees in a churchyard. On the west gable is a bellcote.	12th century	The earliest fabric in the church dates from the 12th century, with additions and alterations made in the 16th–19th centuries. The font is from the 12th century and has a 17th-century cover.	II
Ireby Old Church, Ireby	Cumbria; 54.7427°N 3.2071°W	A small, simple, stone church, in front of which is a stone wall. On the far gable is a bellcote with a single bell.	12th century	Only the chancel of this church remains, standing in an isolated field. The rest of the church was demolished in 1845–46, and the chancel was restored in 1880 by Ewan Christian.	I
St Oswald, Kirk Sandall, Doncaster	South Yorkshire; 53.5663°N 1.0815°W	A squat stone church with a gabled porch, beyond which is a low tower with a pyramidal roof, and the body of the church is behind this	12th century	The oldest parts of the church are Norman in style. Additions were made in the 14th century, and in the 16th century the Perpendicular Rokeby chapel was built. The tower was added in 1828, and restorations took place in 1864 and 1934.	II*
St Mary, Stainburn	North Yorkshire; 53.9325°N 1.6246°W	A low church seen from the south, with the nave and a porch on the left, the chancel on the right, and a bellcote on the gable between them	12th century	The chancel arch, some windows and the font are Norman in style. In 1894 a vestry was added, but otherwise restorations and alterations have been minimal.	I
St John, Throapham, Dinnington	South Yorkshire; 53.3824°N 1.2149°W	A stone church from the east seen at a distance in a churchyard, showing the east window and a battlemented west tower	12th century	Although much of the church dates from the 12th century, it contains some Anglo-Saxon fabric. The tower was added in the 15th century, and in 1709 the chancel and porch were rebuilt. Inside the church is a carved coffin lid dating from about 1300.	I
St Peter, Wintringham	North Yorkshire; 54.1468°N 0.6432°W	Part of a stone church seen from the southeast, with a protruding south aisle, and a tower surmounted by a spire	12th century	The chancel dates from the Norman period, and the nave and tower from the 14th century. The tracery in the bell openings is Decorated and that in the west window is Perpendicular in style.	I
St Peter, Edlington	South Yorkshire; 53.4694°N 1.1993°W	A stone church seen from the south. On the left is a tower with a battlemented parapet, in the middle is the nave, also with a battlemented parapet, and on the right is the chancel with a plain parapet	Late 12th century	This church contains Norman carvings, although the style of the church generally was becoming Transitional. Additions were made in the 13th–15th centuries, the later ones in Perpendicular style.	I
St Lawrence (old), York	North Yorkshire; 53.9542°N 1.0685°W	A tower with a round-arched doorway at the bottom, two-light bell openings at the top, surmounted by a low pyramidal roof	Late 12th century	Only the tower of the original church survives; its top storey was added in the early 16th century. The rest of the church was demolished in 1881–83, and the Norman north doorway of the nave was re-erected against the east wall of the tower.	I
Holy Trinity, Coverham	North Yorkshire; 54.2729°N 1.8418°W	A stone church seen from the south with a battlemented tower on the left	13th century	Originating in the 13th century, additions were made in the 14th and 17th centuries, with the tower dating from the 16th century. Most of the internal fittings are Victorian.	II*
St John the Baptist, Stanwick St John	North Yorkshire; 54.5028°N 1.7156°W	A stone church in a graveyard seen from the southwest, with a prominent battlemented tower and the body of the church and porch stretching behind it	13th century	The church stands within the earthworks of an Iron Age settlement, and is a scheduled monument. It was heavily restored in 1868 by Anthony Salvin. In the churchyard are an Anglo-Saxon cross shaft, and two 19th-century wells.	I
Holy Trinity, Wensley	North Yorkshire; 54.3014°N 1.8600°W	A long stone church in a graveyard, see from the northeast, with a north vestry, and a tower at the far end	13th century	This church is built on the foundations of an 8th century Saxon church. Additions or alterations were made to it in the 14th and 15th centuries, and the tower was built in 1719. It contains a richly carved family pew.	I
St Mary, Lead, near Saxton	North Yorkshire; 53.8263°N 1.2963°W	A small chapel-like church seen from the south, with a bellcote at the left, a door and a single window	14th century	It is a small chapel in the middle of a field, containing a collection of 13th-century carvings, and furniture dating from the 18th century. It was saved from destruction in the 1930s by a group of ramblers.	II*
St Mary, Thornton-le-Moors	Cheshire; 53.2650°N 2.8386°W	A red sandstone church seen from the south with a battlemented tower on the left	14th century	The nave, chancel and south aisle date from the 14th century. The tower and a chapel were added in the 16th century, the south porch in the late 17th century and the chancel arch in the 19th century. The church was damaged by fire in 1909 and was largely rebuilt in 1910.	I
Holy Trinity (old), Wentworth	South Yorkshire; 53.4799°N 1.4233°W	A stone church seen from a slight angle, with a flat-topped tower at the left, then the ruined south wall of the nave, and on the right part of the chancel	14th–15th century	The nave of this church is a ruin, but the tower, built in the 14th–15th centuries, and the chancel of 1684 survive intact. The chancel and a chapel were restored in 1925 and contain family memorials.	II*
All Saints, Harewood	West Yorkshire; 53.9003°N 1.5240°W	A long stone church seen from the southeast with a low tower at the far end	c. 1410	The church stands in the park of Harewood House. It was restored in 1862–63 by Sir George Gilbert Scott, and contains a set of six alabaster memorials dating from between 1419 and 1510.	I
St Martin, Whenby	North Yorkshire; 54.1204°N 1.0364°W	A stone church seen from the southeast, with both the west tower and the south aisle battlemented	15th century	St Martin's is mainly Perpendicular in style, and the church was extensively restored between 1871 and 1910. The chancel screen dates from the 15th century, and the screen to the north chapel is Jacobean in style.	II*
St Mary, South Cowton	North Yorkshire; 54.4186°N 1.5497°W	A stone church seen from a slight angle, with an embattled tower on the left, the nave in the centre, and the chancel on the right	1450–70	Built by Sir Richard Conyers, the church was restored in 1883. It contains a font, a rood screen, choirstalls, alabaster effigies, and a painting on the chancel arch, all dating from the 15th century.	I
St Michael, Cowthorpe	North Yorkshire; 53.9685°N 1.3506°W	A stone church seen from the southwest with a prominent battlemented tower at the base of which is a recessed arch containing a large window	1456–58	With its "military" appearance, this church is mainly Perpendicular in style. It contains an unusual Easter Sepulchre, and fragments of medieval heraldic stained glass.	I
St Leonard (old), Langho	Lancashire; 53.8182°N 2.4556°W	A simple low church with a south porch. On the west gable is a bellcote, and on the east gable is a cross	1557	It is thought that much of the stonework and some of the fittings of this church came from nearby Whalley Abbey following the Dissolution of the Monasteries. It was restored in 1879 and a vestry was added.	I
St Werburgh (old), Warburton	Greater Manchester; 53.4021°N 2.4573°W	A brick church with its tower at the east end; this contains a round-headed doorway, an oval window, twin bell openings, and simple pinnacles	Late 16th century	This is one of the few surviving timber-framed churches in England. Additions to the walls in stone were made in 1645, and in brick in 1711, when the tower was also added.	I
St John the Evangelist, Leeds	West Yorkshire; 53.8001°N 1.5423°W	A substantial stone church seen from the northwest. The tower has crocketted pinnacles, and the north wall of the body of the church has a series of large rectangular windows	1632–34	St John's is the oldest church in Leeds city centre, and it contains fine Jacobean fittings. A plan to demolish it in the 19th century was unsuccessful, and it was restored by Richard Norman Shaw in 1866–68.	I
St Ninian, Brougham	Cumbria; 54.6628°N 2.6847°W	A long low simple stone church seen from the southeast with a south porch and a west bellcote	1660	The church is built on a remote site replacing an older Norman church. It is a simple church, almost unaltered since it was built by Lady Anne Clifford in 1659.	I
St John the Baptist (old), Pilling	Lancashire; 53.9290°N 2.9111°W	A simpled small church with a bellcote on the left gable	1717	A small, simple church, it has retained its original Georgian liturgical arrangement. The walls were raised in 1813 for the inclusion of galleries; it is otherwise unaltered.	II*
Holy Trinity, Sunderland	Tyne and Wear; 54.9077°N 1.3688°W	A brick church with stone dressings seen from the south. The west tower has a clock and pinnacles, and along the south face of the body of the church are Georgian-style windows	1718–19	Holy Trinity is built in brick with stone dressings. In 1735 an apse with a Venetian window were added, and a west gallery and new roof in about 1803. Many of the original fittings are still present.	I
St Mary, Tarleton	Lancashire; 53.6748°N 2.8239°W	A Georgian style brick church seen from the southwest with a porch protruding in the foreground, a slim tower topped by a rotunda, and the body of the church extending beyond	1719	This church is constructed in hand-made brick. In 1824 the tower was raised and a bellcote was added; at the same time a porch and vestry were built at the west end. It is Georgian in style, and retains many of its original fittings.	II*
St Martin, Allerton Mauleverer	North Yorkshire; 54.0159°N 1.3668°W	The west end of a stone church with three gable ends, a circular window and a doorway and more windows with round heads	1745–46	The church is situated just outside the grounds of Allerton Castle. It is mainly in Norman revival style with a Perpendicular east window. Inside are four effigies, two of which represent members of the Mauleverer family.	II*
St John the Evangelist, Lancaster	Lancashire; 54.0504°N 2.7990°W	A Georgian style church seen from the south with round-headed windows and a tower on the left surmounted by a spirelet	1754–55	St John's originated as a chapel of ease to Lancaster Priory. A tower and spire designed by Thomas Harrison were added in 1784. The interior was restored in 1955 by Sir Albert Richardson, but the church closed in 1981.	II*
St George, Carrington	Greater Manchester; 53.4300°N 2.4110°W	A plain brick church with tall Georgian-style windows	1757–59	Founded as a chapel of ease, it is now redundant, and stands amongst derelict industrial buildings near the Manchester Ship Canal.	II*
Becconsall Old Church, Hesketh Bank	Lancashire; 53.7025°N 2.8312°W	A small brick church seen from the southwest with a small porch, a bellcote, and large round-headed windows	1764	Designed in Georgian style, the church was built on the site of a former chantry chapel. It became redundant in 1926 when a new church, also dedicated to All Saints, was built on a different site.	II
St Thomas (Heights Chapel), Friarmere, Delph	Greater Manchester; 53.5782°N 2.0284°W	A two-storey stone church with round-headed windows and a bellcote on the near gable	1765	Standing on a hillside, this was built to serve people who otherwise had a long journey to attend church. It is in Georgian style, and a bellcote was added in the 19th century.	II*
St Andrew, Shotley, Greymare Hill, near Consett	Northumberland; 54.8915°N 1.9310°W	A small stone church seen from the southwest with a south transept as large as the nave	1769	St Andrew's stands in an isolated position on a hill at a height of 960 feet (293 m). It was built to replace an earlier church. During the 19th century it suffered from subsidence caused by mine workings.	II
Christ Church, Macclesfield	Cheshire; 53.2586°N 2.1305°W	A two-storey brick church with a tall slim tower. It has clock faces and a battlemented parapet	1775–76	Charles Roe, who played a major part in developing the silk industry in the town, paid for the building of the church. It was one of the earliest to use cast iron for the columns supporting the galleries. The tower is disproportionately high to compete with the height of the tower of nearby St Michael's Church.	II*
All Saints (old), Skelton-in-Cleveland	North Yorkshire; 54.5623°N 0.9925°W	A plain stone church seen through a churchyard with a battlemented tower	1785	All Saints was built on the site of an earlier church and incorporates some of its fabric. The transept was used as a family pew and contains box pews and a fireplace. The three-decker pulpit and tester date from 1785.	II*
St Stephen (old), Robin Hood's Bay, Fylingdales	North Yorkshire; 54.4402°N 0.5497°W	A small stone church standing in a churchyard on top of a hill. On the near gable is a bell-cupola.	1821–22	The church stands in an elevated position overlooking the town and the sea. Its interior has not been altered since it was built; it contains galleries, box pews and a three-decker pulpit.	I
Holy Trinity, Blackburn	Lancashire; 53.7511°N 2.4746°W	A substantial stone church seen from the south; from the left is a tower with pinnacles, a nave with clerestory, a large south transept, and a short chancel	1837–46	A Commissioners' church, this was designed by Edmund Sharpe. Its ceiling is divided into 80 panels, each of which contains a painted coat of arms. The organ came from the Hanover Square Rooms in London.	II
St Mary, Roecliffe	North Yorkshire; 54.0885°N 1.4277°W	A small simple, stone church seen from the southwest, showing a bellcote, buttresses, and a round-arched doorway and west window, each flanked by columns	1843	St Mary's is designed in Neo-Norman style. Its Jacobean pulpit came from Holy Trinity Church, Hull, and the vestry door and the marble steps leading up to the chancel came from York Minster.	II*
Christ Church, Heaton Norris, Stockport	Greater Manchester; 53.4144°N 2.1678°W	An elaborately decorated tower in light stone with dark stone dressings, windows of varying shapes and sizes, pinnacles, and a spire	1846	Only the tower and part of the aisle walls have survived. It was a Commissioners' church and designed by William Hayley. The church was badly damaged by a fire in 1977, leading to its partial demolition.	II
St Gregory, Vale of Lune, near Sedbergh	Cumbria; 54.3240°N 2.5638°W	A small stone church with a porch and a bellcote in the foreground, and the body of the church, on which is a glazed lantern on the roof, receding into the background	1850	This was built as a chapel for the Upton family of Ingmire Hall. In its early days it served the navvies building the Ingleton Branch Line of the London and North Western Railway.	II
St John the Evangelist, Cadeby	South Yorkshire; 53.4989°N 1.2254°W	A small stone church seen from the south, with an extensive roof, small lancet windows, a prominent gabled porch, and a central bellcote	1856	St John's was designed by Sir George Gilbert Scott for Sir Joseph Copley. The interior contains carvings by J. Birnie Philip and many of the original fittings.	II
All Souls, Halifax	West Yorkshire; 53.7304°N 1.8628°W	A stone church seen from a slight angle at the southwest, with a tower and tall spire on the left and the body of the church extending to the right	1856–59	The local industrialist Edward Akroyd commissioned Sir George Gilbert Scott to design this church which was intended to be the centrepiece of his model village of Akroydon. The spire is 236 feet (72 m) high, and all the windows contain stained glass. Scott considered it to be his finest church.	I
St Stephen, Copley	West Yorkshire; 53.6972°N 1.8731°W	A stone church seen through foliage with an apse to the left, a nave and chancel with a clerestory, and a bellcote towards the left	1863	W. H. Crossland designed this church for Edward Akroyd. Standing on a hillside overlooking the River Calder it is tall and narrow with a polygonal apse.	II*
St Stephen, Low Elswick, Newcastle upon Tyne	Tyne and Wear; 54.9635°N 1.6401°W	A tower with a stair turret, pinnacles and a spire	1868	Only the tower of this church has survived. Its foundation stone was laid by Sir William Armstrong, and it was dedicated by Charles Baring, Bishop of Durham.	II
St Edmond, Rochdale	Greater Manchester; 53.6210°N 2.1655°W	A church tower with pinnacles and a tall stair turret rising above brick buildings in the foreground	1870–73	The church was designed by J. Medland Taylor for Albert Hudson Royds, a local banker and prominent Freemason. It is constructed in sandstone with tiled roofs, at a cost of £28,000. The church has a cruciform plan with a tower at the crossing. It is notable for its combination of Gothic Revival architectural features with symbols of Freemasonry. The church closed in 2009.	I
Christ the Consoler, Skelton-on-Ure	North Yorkshire; 54.1062°N 1.4510°W	A stone church seen from the northeast with a large east window, a clerestory, and a tower with pinnacles and a spire	1871–76	The church stands in the grounds of Newby Hall. Frederick Vyner, the son of the hall's owner, was kidnapped and murdered by Greek bandits in 1870. The money his mother collected for the ransom was instead used to pay for this church in his memory. William Burges was commissioned as the architect.	I
St Andrew, East Heslerton	North Yorkshire; 54.1773°N 0.5826°W	A stone church seen from the northeast with a broad tower and spire, a chancel with an apse and, between them a small vestry	1877	St Andrew's was designed by G. E. Street for Sir Tatton Sykes of Sledmere House. The four statues on the tower were originally intended for the north porch of Bristol Cathedral.	I
All Souls, Bolton	Greater Manchester; 53.5937°N 2.4339°W	A broad church in brick with stone dressings, seen from the northeast, with a canted apse, a crocketted pinnacle, and in the distance a tower, also with crocketted pinnacles	1880–81	Thomas Greenhalgh, an Evangelical mill-owner, commissioned Paley and Austin to design the church. The nave has no pillars, making it one of the widest unsupported parish churches in England.	II*
Christ Church (old), Waterloo	Merseyside; 53.4709°N 3.0237°W	The tower and part of the body of a sandstone church seen from the north between trees	1891–99	Built to replace an older church which had become structurally unsound, this was designed by Paley, Austin and Paley. Since being declared redundant it has suffered from neglect and vandalism, but it is now supported by a group known as The Friends of Old Christ Church who organise events and activities.	II*

== See also ==
- List of churches preserved by the Churches Conservation Trust in the East of England
- List of churches preserved by the Churches Conservation Trust in the English Midlands
- List of churches preserved by the Churches Conservation Trust in Southeast England
- List of churches preserved by the Churches Conservation Trust in Southwest England

== Notes ==
^{A} This is the period, or where possible the date, of the earliest existing part of the building (excluding small amounts of fabric or re-used material).
