= Uldale =

Village in Cumbria, England

Coordinates: 54.72°N 03.17°W

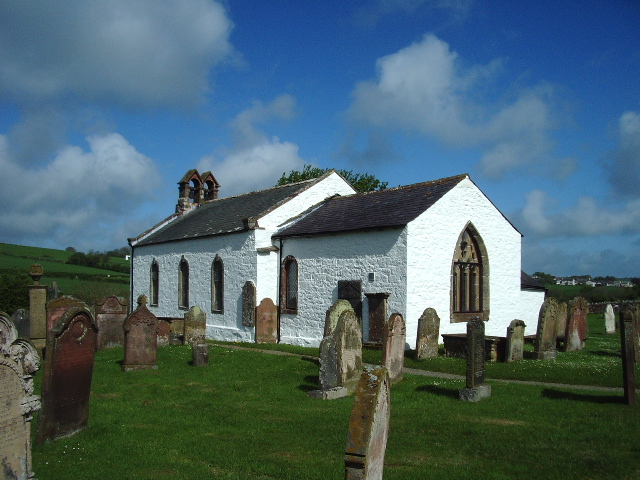
- St James Church, Uldale

- Location in Allerdale, Cumbria Location within Cumbria
- OS grid reference: NY2436
- Civil parish: Ireby and Uldale
- Unitary authority: Cumberland
- Ceremonial county: Cumbria
- Region: North West
- Country: England
- Sovereign state: United Kingdom
- Post town: WIGTON
- Postcode district: CA7
- Dialling code: 016973
- Police: Cumbria
- Fire: Cumbria
- Ambulance: North West
- UK Parliament: Penrith and Solway

Uldale is a small village and former civil parish in the Cumberland district, in the ceremonial county of Cumbria, England. It is about 5 miles (8 km) from Caldbeck, 2 miles (3 km) from Ireby with which it now forms the civil parish of Ireby and Uldale together with Aughertree. The Uldale Fells are in the vicinity, and to the southeast are Chapelhouse Reservoir and Over Water. It is located just inside the Lake District National Park. In 1931 the parish had a population of 217.

Uldale has a place in literature as the occasional home of Judith Paris, a heroine of the Herries Chronicles, the saga of a Cumbrian family written by Hugh Walpole in the 1930s.

== Buildings ==
St. James' Church (the "old church") is located 1 mile (2 km) outside Uldale, yet only 0.5 miles (1 km) from Ireby. It has a Grade II listing. A school was founded in 1726 on the current site of Dale House, but later moved to a larger building funded by the Cape family and many local famIlies.

The Old Church of England School was built in 1895 and served as the village School for over 100 years until closure in the 1990s. The building was set for demolition but was saved in 2010 when it was transformed into a tea room + gallery.

== Governance ==
Uldale is part of the parliamentary constituency of Penrith and Solway.

For Local Government purposes it is part of the Cumberland unitary authority area.

The village forms part of the civil parish of Ireby and Uldale and has its own Parish Council along with Ireby, Ireby and Uldale Parish Council.

On 1 April 1934 the parish was abolished to form Ireby.

== Notable people ==
- Jonathan Cape

== See also ==
- Listed buildings in Ireby and Uldale
- Little Cockup
- Chapelhouse Reservoir
