= Listed buildings in Ireby and Uldale =

Ireby and Uldale is a civil parish in the Cumberland district in Cumbria, England. It contains 35 listed buildings that are recorded in the National Heritage List for England. Of these, one is listed at Grade I, the highest of the three grades, two are at Grade II*, the middle grade, and the others are at Grade II, the lowest grade. The parish is mainly rural, and contains the villages and smaller settlements of Ireby, High Ireby, Uldale, and Ruthwaite. Most of the listed buildings are houses, cottages, farmhouses, farm buildings, and associated structures. The other listed buildings include churches and associated structures, a market cross, a war memorial, and a hotel.

== Key ==
Grade	Criteria
I	Buildings of exceptional interest, sometimes considered to be internationally important
II*	Particularly important buildings of more than special interest
II	Buildings of national importance and special interest

== Buildings ==
Name and location	Photograph	Date	Notes	Grade
Ireby Old Church; 54.74267°N 3.20710°W		12th century	The nave, north aisle and porch were demolished in 1845, leaving only the chancel. This was restored in 1880 by Ewan Christian, but the church became redundant in 1972. It is in mixed sandstone and limestone on a partly chamfered plinth, and has a green slate roof. On the west gable is an open bellcote. Medieval grave slabs are built into the walls. The church, and the surrounding churchyard and its contents, are a scheduled monument.	I
St James' Church, Uldale; 54.73059°N 3.18152°W		12th century	The church was altered in 1730, additions were made in 1837 when the chancel was rebuilt, and the church was restored in 1914 by J. H. Martindale. It is in whitewashed rubble and has a green slate roof with coped gables. The church consists of a nave, a chancel, and a north vestry, and there is a double bellcote on the west gable. The east window is in Decorated style.	II
Aisle columns, Ireby Old Church; 54.74277°N 3.20726°W	—	13th century	When the church was reduced in size in 1845, the aisle columns were used as gate posts for a house in Ireby village, and were returned to their original location in 1977. They consist of two octagonal sandstone monolithic columns with bases and capitals.	II*
Orthwaite Hall and barn 54.69709°N 3.16105°W	—	Late 16th or early 17th century (probable)	A house was added to the farmhouse in 1675, and this has since been converted into a barn, The building is in mixed slate and limestone rubble, the barn being rendered, and with a green slate roof. The house has two storeys and six bays and contains a doorway with an architrave and a segmental pediment. The windows are mullioned and contain casements in architraves with a pulvinated frieze and a cornice, The barn is at right-angles to the left, and it contains a doorway with a chamfered alternate-block surround and a lintel with a keystone.	II*
Butter Cross; 54.73777°N 3.18535°W		17th century (probable)	A market cross in red sandstone. It has a stepped plinth, an octagonal head, and a 19th-century restored cross head, its design being based on the font in St James' Church.	II
Ireby Hall and barns 54.73766°N 3.18672°W	—	Mid 17th century (probable)	The farmhouse and barns were altered and extended in the 19th century; they are rendered and have Welsh slate roofs. The house has two storeys and three bays, a three-bay extension to the right, and another extension at the rear. The doorway in the original part has a chamfered surround, and in the extension is a doorway with a Tuscan porch. The windows are sashes. Flanking the house on each side are L-shaped barns, giving the building a U-shaped plan, These contain through archways, doorways, loft doors, and casement windows.	II
Moot Hall; 54.73769°N 3.18513°W		17th century	The former moot hall was extended by the addition of a wing to the left in the early 19th century, and a wing to the right in the late 19th century, and it has since been divided into three dwellings. The building is rendered with a green slate roof, it has two storeys, and each wing has two bays. The windows on the front are casements, the central doorway has an architrave and a segmental pediment, and above it is a coat of arms. At the rear are mullioned windows, some with the mullions removed.	II
Smithy Cottage and adjoining former smithy 54.72189°N 3.16623°W	—	Mid or late 17th century	The building is in rubble with green slate roofs. The house has two storeys and four bays, a single-bay former stable to the left incorporated into the house, and the former smithy at right-angles to the right. The doorway has a Tudor arched lintel, and the windows are a mix of sashes and casements. The former smithy has a garage door and a casement window.	II
John Peel Cottage and barn 54.72034°N 3.18428°W	—	Late 17th century	Originally a farmhouse, later a house and a barn, it is stuccoed with a green slate roof. The house is in two storeys and three bays, and has mullioned windows with chamfered surrounds. The lower barn is to the right, and has a central cart entrance with a wooden lintel. It was the home of John Peel.	II
Kiln Brow and barn 54.72466°N 3.19724°W	—	Late 17th century	The farmhouse and barn are in rendered limestone and have a green slate roof. The house has two storeys and four bays, and contains casement windows. The barn to the left has a blocked doorway converted into a window, and ventilation slits.	II
Mains Hall; 54.73753°N 3.18498°W	—	Late 17th century	A roughcast limestone house with a green slate roof, it has two storeys and three bays. The doorway has an architrave, above it is an oval plaque, and the mullioned windows have chamfered surrounds. Inside the house is an inglenook and a bressumer.	II
Rose Cottage; 54.72036°N 3.18392°W	—	Late 17th century	A rendered house with a green slate roof, in two storeys and two bays. The surrounds of the doorway and windows are chamfered, and the original mullions have been removed and some windows have 20th-century replacements. There is also a small fire window.	II
Town Head and former stable 54.73189°N 3.15525°W	—	Late 17th century	A farmhouse and former stable in sandstone with quoins, and a green slate roof with coped gables. There are two storeys; the house has two bays with a single-bay extension to the right and a single-bay former stable to the left. Some windows are sashes, others are casements, and in the former stable is a loft door. Inside the house is a bressumer.	II
Standingstone Cottage and Eardon Cottage; 54.73993°N 3.18439°W	—	1684	Originally a house and a stable, later converted into two houses. The building is roughcast with a green slate roof, and has two storeys. The original house has been divided into two, the right two bays forming Eardon Cottage, and the former stable has been incorporated into the other cottage. The original doorway has a panelled frieze and a cornice. In the original house the windows are sashes, and in the stable they are casements. Inside the house is a bressumer.	II
Low Longlands and barn 54.71295°N 3.13991°W	—	1688	The farmhouse and barn are in cobble rubble, the house being rendered, and they have a tiled roof. The house has two storeys and two bays, with a two-bay extension to the right, and a two-bay barn further to the right. There is a doorway with a chamfered surround and a dated lintel. Some windows are sashes, others are casements. In the barn are a cart entrance, a doorway, a loft door, and a pigeon hole.	II
Road Farmhouse; 54.72012°N 3.18409°W	—	1690	A stuccoed farmhouse with a green slate roof, in two storeys and four bays. The doorway has a dated and inscribed lintel, and the windows are sashes. There is also a small fire window. Inside the house are an inglenook and a bressumer.	II
Lower Ruthwaite Farmhouse and barn 54.72022°N 3.18362°W	—	1691	The farmhouse and barn are rendered with green slate roofs. The house has two storeys and four bays, and the barn is at a right-angle on the right, giving an L-shaped plan. The windows are casements, and the doorway has a porch, an architrave, and a dated lintel. The barn has a projecting cart entrance, a doorway and windows.	II
Longlands Cottage and barn 54.71357°N 3.13919°W	—	1694	The farmhouse is roughcast on large plinth stones, and has a roof of slate, partly green slate and partly Welsh. There are two storeys and two bays, with an outshut to the rear. At the rear is a doorway with a chamfered surround and a dated lintel. In the outshut is a mullioned window and windows with mullions removed; the other windows are modern. The barn to the left is in mixed limestone and cobble rubble masonry. At its rear is a cart entrance, a doorway and a casement window. Inside the house is an inglenook and a bressumer.	II
Ruthwaite Farmhouse; 54.72011°N 3.18476°W	—	Late 17th or early 18th century	A rendered farmhouse with a tile roof. It has two storeys and three bays, and a rear extension, giving it a T-shaped plan. Some of the windows are mullioned and others are sashes.	II
Ruthwaite Cottage and barn 54.71984°N 3.18526°W	—	Early 18th century	The farmhouse and barn have green slate roofs. The farmhouse is roughcast, and has two storeys and two bays. The doorway has an architrave, and the windows are sashes. The barn to the right has a large cart entrance.	II
Whent House; 54.74000°N 3.18439°W	—	Early 18th century	A roughcast house with a green slate roof, in two storeys and two bays. The windows are sashes, one of which has retained its original chamfered surround.	II
Dale View and Hemp Garth; 54.73988°N 3.18408°W	—	1726	A row of three houses, later converted into two, they are roughcast with a green slate roof. They have two storeys, Dale View to the right has five bays, and Hemp Garth has three. Most of the doorways and windows have chamfered surrounds, and one doorway has an inscribed lintel. The windows in Dale View are sashes, and those in Hemp Garth are casements; the latter house also having a porch.	II
Croft House Farmhouse and barns 54.73964°N 3.18469°W	—	Mid 18th century	The farmhouse and barns are roughcast with green slate roofs. The house has two storeys and two bays, with an L-shaped barn and dairy to the left, and a lower barn to the right. The windows are sashes. In the left barn is a through arch and a casement window.	II
Dash Farmhouse and barn 54.67912°N 3.13631°W	—	Mid or late 18th century	The farmhouse and barn are rendered with a green slate roof. The house has two storeys and three bays, with an L-shaped barn to the right. The doorway and some windows have chamfered surrounds, the windows being sashes. In the barn is a doorway, a casement window, and a loft door reached by projecting slate steps.	II
Newbiggin Grange; 54.75439°N 3.22265°W	—	Late 18th century	A farmhouse built in rubble, rendered at the rear, on earlier foundations, with large plinth stones and a green slate roof. There are two storeys and three bays, with a single-bay extension to the right, and a lower two-bay extension to the left. Above the doorway is a fanlight, and the windows are sashes.	II
Chapel House Farmhouse; 54.71391°N 3.15221°W	—	Late 18th or early 19th century	The farmhouse is in mixed slate and cobble rubble, with quoins and a green slate roof. There are two storeys and three bays. The windows are sashes, and at the rear is a round-headed stair window.	II
Lowthwaite; 54.70965°N 3.14690°W	—	Late 18th or early 19th century	A farmhouse in rubble with a green slate roof. It has two storeys and three bays, and an extension at the rear. The windows are horizontally sliding sashes with flattened segmental arches.	II
Mirkholme Farmhouse; 54.68405°N 3.15834°W	—	Late 18th or early 19th century	The farmhouse is in rubble with angle pilasters and a green slate roof. It has two storeys and three bays, and contains sash windows.	II
Townend; 54.72178°N 3.17084°W	—	Late 18th or early 19th century	A stuccoed farmhouse with quoins, an eaves cornice, and a green slate roof with coped gables. There are two storeys and three bays, and the windows are sashes. The doorway has an architrave, a cornice on consoles, and a pediment.	II
Ellenside House; 54.74038°N 3.18277°W	—	Early 19th century	A stuccoed house on a chamfered plinth with quoins and a hipped green slate roof. There are two storeys and three bays with a rear extension giving an L-shaped plan. The doorway has a fanlight, in the ground floor are French windows, and along the front is a verandah on cast iron supports. Elsewhere the windows are sashes. The rear extension is in sandstone, and against the rear wall is a mounting block.	II
Garden wall and drinking trough, Moot Hall; 54.73772°N 3.18492°W	—	Early 19th century	The wall dates from the later part of the 18th century. It is a low wall in mixed limestone and sandstone with occasional sandstone uprights, and runs round three sides of the garden. In the centre is an oval sandstone trough with a shaped back and a cast iron spout with a lion's head.	II
Uldale Hall and barn 54.72171°N 3.16750°W	—	Early 19th century	The farmhouse and barn have a green slate roof with coped gables. The house is stuccoed with a string course and rusticated quoins. There are two storeys and three bays, a doorway with pilasters, and sash windows in architraves. The barn is in rubble and contains doorways and loft doors.	II
The Marshalls; 54.71514°N 3.18487°W	—	Early to mid 19th century	A stuccoed house with quoins, and a green slate roof with coped gables, in two storeys and two bays. It has a projecting porch with open arches on each side and a dentilled cornice. The windows are in Tudor style with hood moulds, those in the ground floor with two lights.	II
Overwater Hall Hotel and garden terrace 54.70077°N 3.17540°W		1840	Originally a country house, later used as a hotel, it is in rendered sandstone on an ashlar plinth. The hotel has two storeys, and three bays flanked by three-bay bow-fronted wings, and with a rear wing, giving an L-shaped plan. On the front are angle pilasters, a string course, a cornice, and a battlemented parapet. The central bay projects forward as a porch with four half-fluted Doric columns, above which is a coat of arms, and a three-light window with pilasters. The windows are sashes. To the left of the hotel is a garden terrace with a balustrade, and at the rear is a round-headed stair window.	II
War memorial, Ireby; 54.74203°N 3.18515°W		1921	The war memorial stands in the churchyard of St James' Church, Ireby immediately to the east of the church. It is in grey granite, and consists of a Celtic cross on a tapering shaft on a tapering four-sided plinth, in all about 2.5 metres (8 ft 2 in) high. On the front of the head of the cross is knotwork carving, and on the front of the shaft and the plinth are inscriptions and the names of those lost in the two World Wars.	II
