= Aughertree =

Village in Cumbria, England

Coordinates: 54.73°N 03.16°W

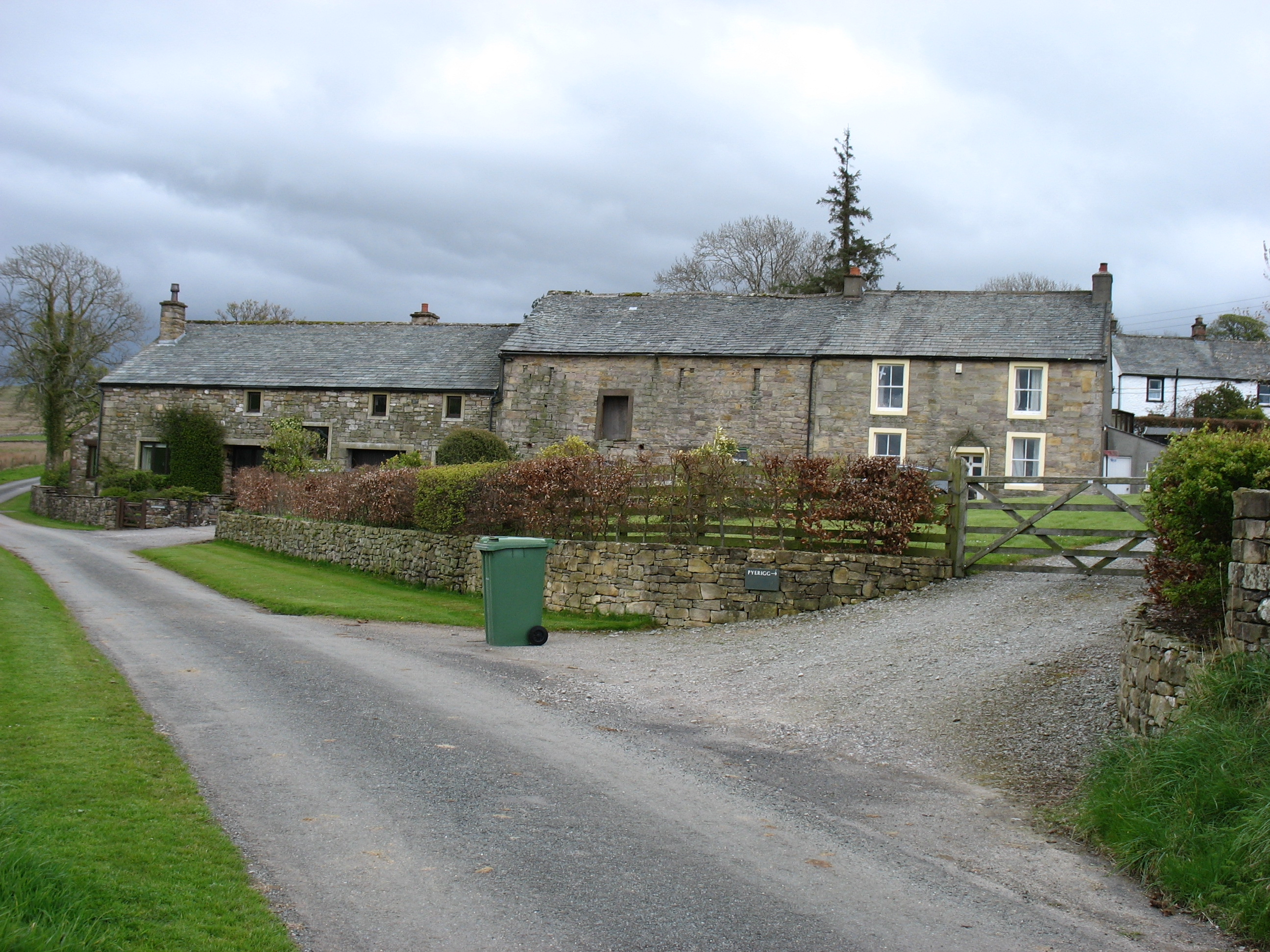
- Cottages

- Location in Allerdale, Cumbria Location within Cumbria
- OS grid reference: NY2538
- Civil parish: Ireby and Uldale
- Unitary authority: Cumberland
- Ceremonial county: Cumbria
- Region: North West
- Country: England
- Sovereign state: United Kingdom
- Post town: WIGTON
- Postcode district: CA7
- Dialling code: 016973
- Police: Cumbria
- Fire: Cumbria
- Ambulance: North West
- UK Parliament: Penrith and Solway

Aughertree (/ˈæfərtriː/ AF-ər-tree) is a village in northern Cumbria, England. It is situated near to the villages of Caldbeck and Torpenhow, but closer to the main local centre Ireby and is in the parish of Ireby and Uldale.

There are at least three Iron Age settlements on the nearby fell, a Neolithic causeway along with several burial mounds that have been extensively excavated in earlier centuries but without sufficient recording or controls.

It used to be a much larger village with several taverns or pubs but none now remain. Some sites of former houses and farms can be seen but these are long gone.

A historic funeral road to Uldale Old Church starts in the hamlet and follows a footpath and bridleway.

== Governance ==
Aughertree is part of the parliamentary constituency of Penrith and Solway.

For Local Government purposes it is in the Cumberland unitary authority area.
