= Chapelhouse Reservoir =

Reservoir in Cumbria, England

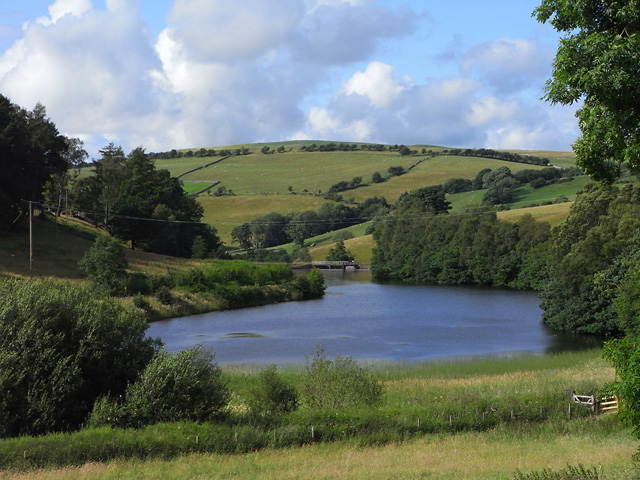
- Chapelhouse Reservoir

- Location in the Lake District National Park Location in Allerdale, Cumbria
- Location: Cumbria
- Coordinates: 54°42′35″N 3°8′57″W
- Type: reservoir
- Basin countries: United Kingdom
- Max. length: 0.27 m (11 in)

Chapelhouse Reservoir is a water reservoir near Uldale in Cumbria, England.

== History ==
The reservoir, which is around 435 metres (1,427 ft) long, was built by John Laing & Son in around 1900. It involved damming the River Ellen above Uldale to provide water for Aspatria and Silloth. It is named after Chapelhouse Farm which is close by, and it is owned by United Utilities. As part of the United Utilities project to supply West Cumbria from Thirlmere, the extraction of water from Chapelhouse Reservoir ceased in October 2022.

Decommissioning of Chapelhouse Reservoir, along with Overwater and Crummock Water, is expected to begin in 2025.

== Sources ==
- Ritchie, Berry (1997). The Good Builder: The John Laing Story. James & James.
