= Bulmer (wapentake) =

Ancient division of Yorkshire, England

- Wapentake
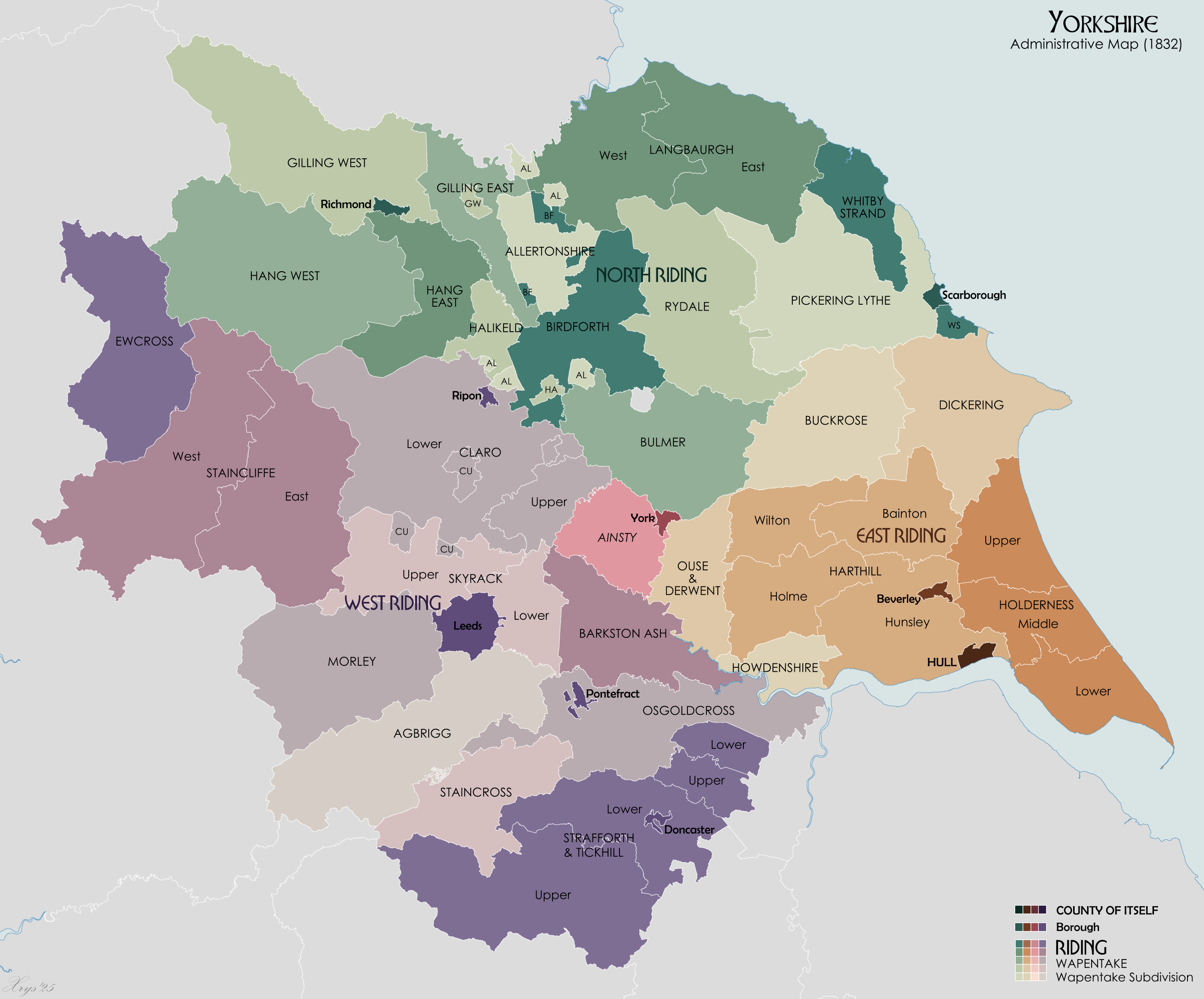
- Wapentakes of North Yorkshire in 1832

Bulmer was a wapentake of the North Riding of Yorkshire. The most southerly wapentake of the riding, in 1859, it had an area of 153,085 acres (61,951 ha). Its meeting place was the village of Bulmer, possibly by a ford which was later replaced by Spital Bridge.

In Domesday, the wapentake was named "Bolesford". It was first recorded as "Bulmer" in 1165/6. By the 13th century, Clifton, Heworth, Osbaldwick, Overton, Rawcliffe, Stockton-on-the-Forest, and Wigginton had been added to the wapentake, while Cold Kirby, Gate Helmsley, and Hildenley were removed. Later, Gate Helmsley was returned to Bulmer, and Clifton, Heworth and Rawcliffe became part of the City of York. The wapentake thereafter consisted of the parishes of Alne, Bossall, Brafferton, Brandsby with Stearsby, Bulmer with Henderskelfe, Crambe, Crayke, Dalby with Skewsby, Easingwold, Foston with Thornton-le-Clay, Gate Helmsley, Haxby, Holtby, Huntington, Huttons Ambo, Marton with Moxby, Myton-upon-Swale, Newton-on-Ouse, Osbaldwick, Overton, Sheriff Hutton, Stillington, Stockton-on-the-Forest, Strensall, Sutton-on-the-Forest, Terrington, Thormanby, Upper Helmsley, Warthill, Whenby, and Wigginton.
