= All Saints Church, Hesketh Bank =

Coordinates: 53.7027°N 2.8400°W

All Saints Church
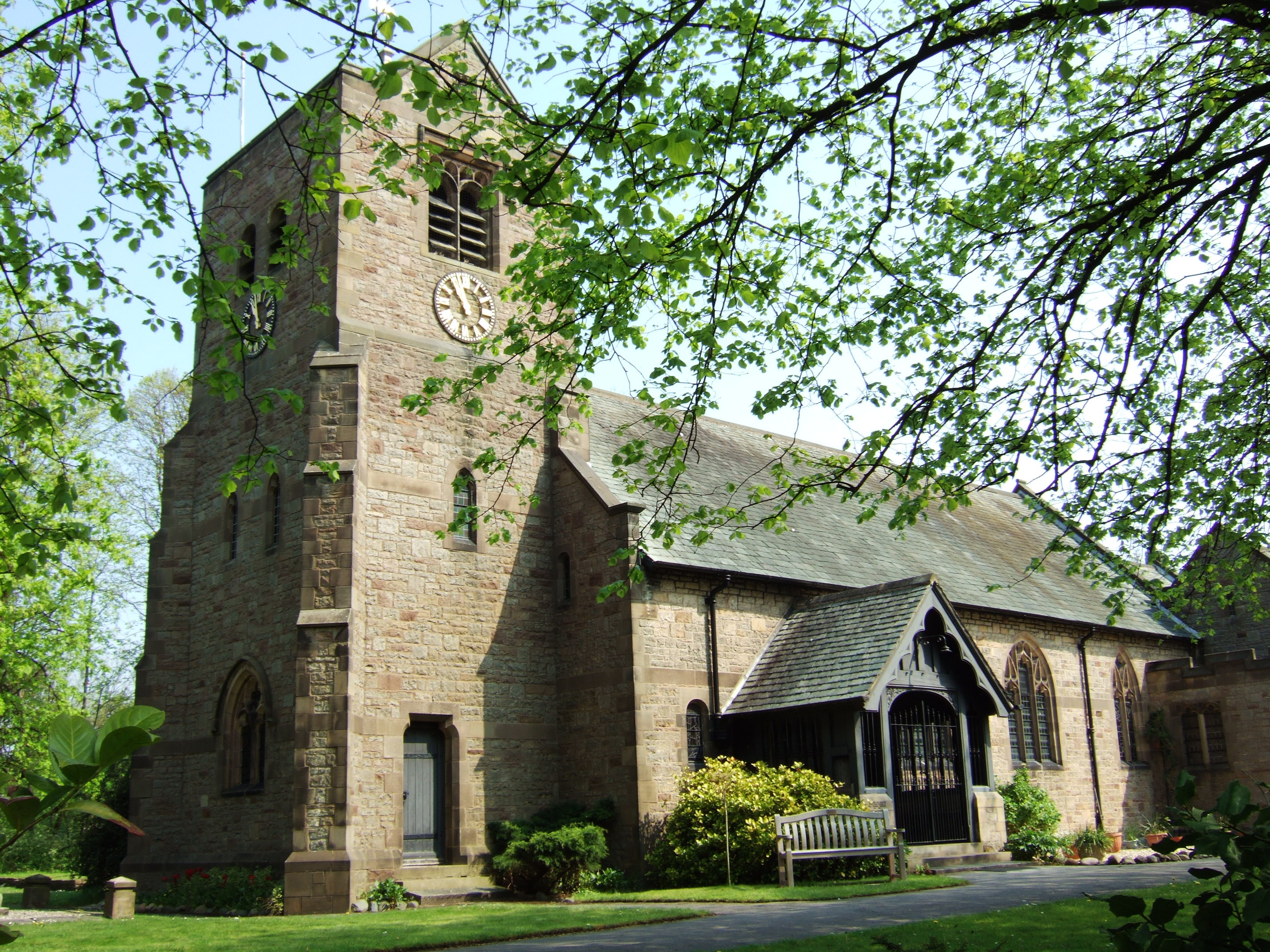
- All Saints Church, Hesketh Bank, from the southwest

- Location in West Lancashire
- OS grid reference: SD 44643 23244
- Location: Station Road, Hesketh Bank, Lancashire
- Country: England
- Denomination: Anglican
- Website: All Saints

History
- Status: Parish church

Architecture
- Functional status: Active
- Architect: Austin and Paley
- Architectural type: Church
- Style: Gothic Revival
- Groundbreaking: 1923
- Completed: 1936

Administration
- Province: York
- Diocese: Blackburn
- Archdeaconry: Blackburn
- Deanery: Leyland
- Parish: Hesketh with Becconsall

Clergy
- Priest: Revd Nicholas Davis

All Saints Church is in Station Road, Hesketh Bank, Lancashire, England. It is an active Anglican parish church in the deanery of Leyland, the archdeaconry of Blackburn, and the diocese of Blackburn.

== History ==
The church was designed by the Lancaster architect Henry Paley of Austin and Paley, and built between 1925 and 1926. Plans had been made in 1923 for a church with a spire, which would have cost about £6,500 (equivalent to £340,000 in 2025), but these were scaled back, and the planned spire was replaced by a tower with a saddleback roof. The new church replaced a smaller church built in 1765, and the site was given by Major T. Fermor-Hesketh. The tower was completed by the same architect in 1935 at a cost of £721.

== Architecture ==
The authors of the Buildings of England series state that this a small church, but that its broad west tower is "impressive". The tower is supported by stepped angle buttresses, and it has a pyramidal roof recessed on two sides. The windows contain tracery based on the Decorated and Perpendicular styles.

== See also ==
- List of ecclesiastical works by Austin and Paley (1916–44)
- Becconsall Old Church
