= Ireby and Uldale =

Civil parish in Cumbria, England

Coordinates: 54°43′44″N 03°10′41″W

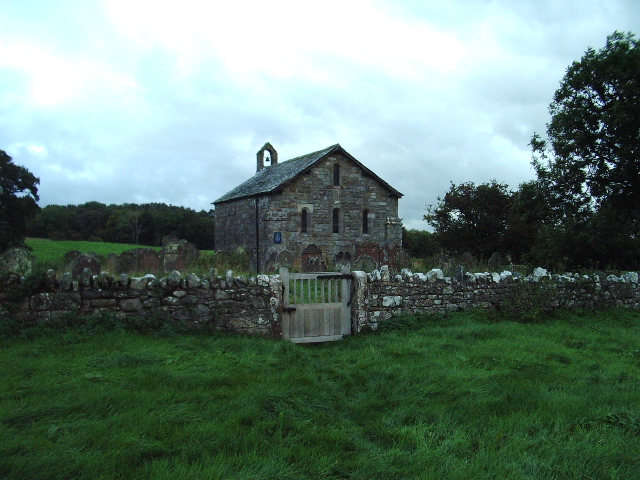
- Ireby Old Chancel

- Location within Cumbria
- Population: 407 (2021 census)
- Civil parish: Ireby and Uldale
- Unitary authority: Cumberland
- Ceremonial county: Cumbria
- Region: North West
- Country: England
- Sovereign state: United Kingdom
- Police: Cumbria
- Fire: Cumbria
- Ambulance: North West

Ireby and Uldale is a civil parish in the Cumberland district, in the ceremonial county of Cumbria, England. The parish includes Aughertree, High Ireby, Ireby, Longlands, Orthwaite, Ruthwaite and Uldale. The population, including neighbouring Bewaldeth and Snittlegarth at the 2011 Census was 458.

Part of the parish lies within the Skiddaw Group SSSI (Site of Special Scientific Interest).

== Governance ==
Ireby and Uldale is part of the parliamentary constituency of Penrith and Solway. From 1974 to 2023 it was in Allerdale district.

Ireby and Uldale has its own Parish Council; Ireby and Uldale Parish Council.

== See also ==
- Listed buildings in Ireby and Uldale
