= Becconsall Old Church =

Redundant church in the village of Hesketh Bank, Lancashire, England

Coordinates: 53.7025°N 2.8312°W

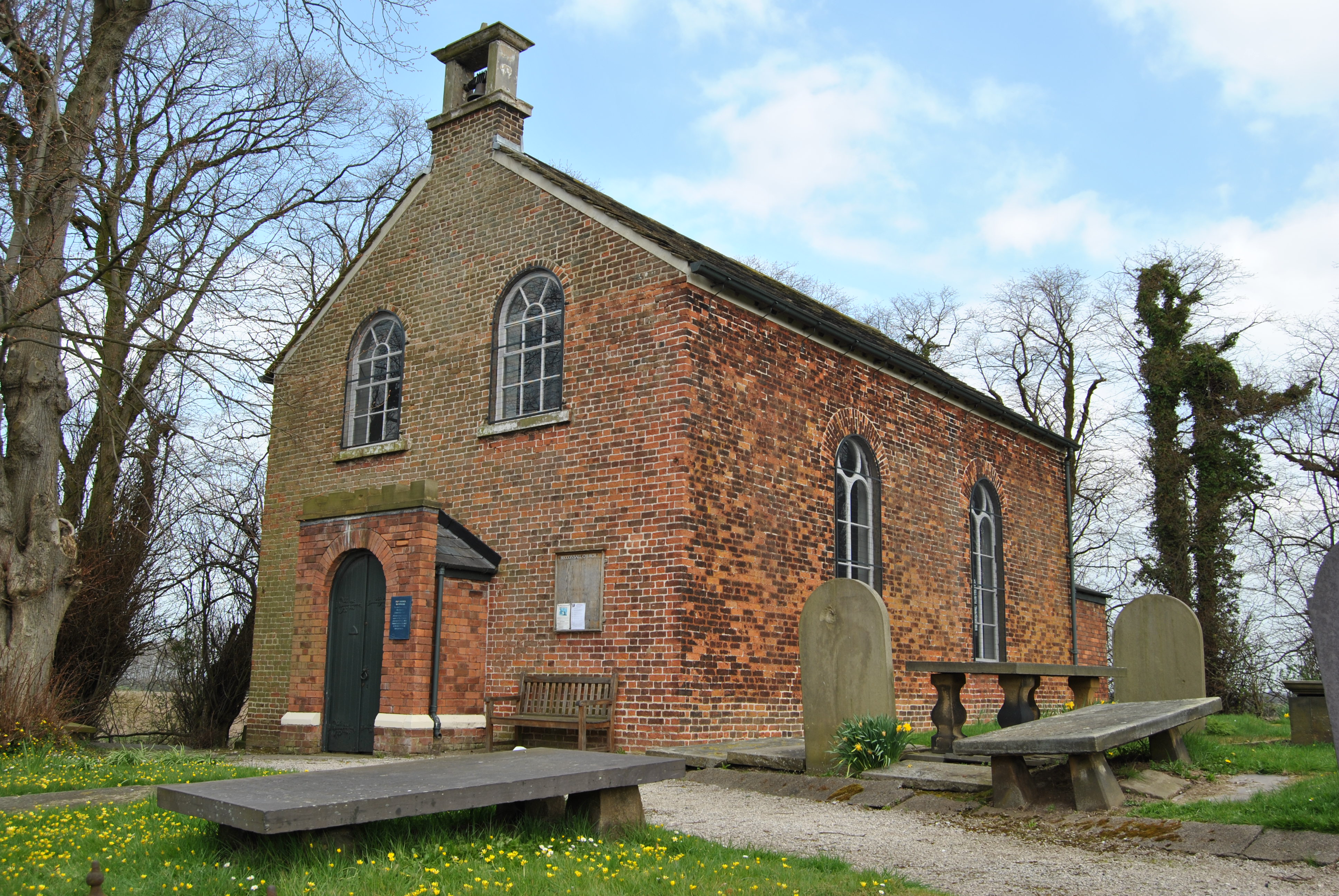
- Becconsall Old Church from the southwest

- Location in West Lancashire
- OS grid reference: NZ 274 513
- Location: Hesketh Bank, Lancashire
- Country: England
- Denomination: Anglican
- Website: Churches Conservation Trust

History
- Dedication: All Saints

Architecture
- Functional status: Redundant
- Heritage designation: Grade II
- Designated: 11 October 1968
- Architectural type: Church
- Style: Georgian
- Construction cost: £90 (£14,200 in 2025)

Specifications
- Length: 36 feet 6 inches (11 m)
- Width: 24 feet (7 m)
- Materials: Brick, stone slate roof

Becconsall Old Church is a redundant church in the village of Hesketh Bank, Lancashire, England. It is recorded in the National Heritage List for England as a designated Grade II listed building, and is in the care of the Churches Conservation Trust. It is situated on a lane leading to a boatyard on the River Douglas.

== History ==
The church was built in 1764 on the site of a former chantry chapel, which had been built in the 16th century as the private chapel of the Becconsall family. The present church cost £90 (equivalent to £14,200),, £60 of which was subscribed by local farmers, and £30 by a levy on the parish. It is constructed in handmade bricks that were supplied by Sir Thomas Hesketh, the lord of the manor. A porch was added to the west end during the 20th century. The church is dedicated to All Saints, but became redundant when a new church with the same dedication was built on a different site in 1926. After this, the old church was only used for funerals and for services on "Old Church Sunday". During the Second World War a bomb fell in the churchyard, damaging gravestones and causing minor damage to the exterior of the church, with shrapnel damage to the gravestones. By 1985 the church was in such a bad state of repair that it had to be closed. It was taken into the care of the charity the Churches Conservation Trust in the 1990s. The charity carried out repairs and the church was reopened in 1995 for the Old Church Sunday services to be resumed.

== Architecture ==
The church is constructed in red brick in English garden wall bond with a stone slate roof. Its plan consists of a simple two-bay rectangular nave with a small sanctuary, a porch at the west end, and a small vestry at the northeast corner. The nave measures 36 feet 6 inches (11 m) by 24 feet (7 m), with the sanctuary being 8 feet (2 m) by 15 feet (5 m). The porch has a round-headed doorway and above it are two round-headed windows. On the apex of the west gable is a small bellcote. On each side of the church are two large round-headed windows, and at the east end is a large Venetian window. Inside the church is a west gallery supported by four fluted wooden pillars. The font, dating from the 18th century, is the form of a vase, and is made from Coade stone. Also in the church are a pulpit, a lectern, two pews, an altar, and some panelling. The bellcote contains a single bell that had been removed but was returned to the church by the Trust.

== External features ==
In the churchyard is a stone sundial dated 1776. It consists of a square baluster-shaped pedestal with a brass plate. The gnomon is missing. The sundial is listed at Grade II.

== See also ==
- Listed buildings in Hesketh-with-Becconsall
- All Saints Church, Becconsall
- List of churches preserved by the Churches Conservation Trust in Northern England
