= Christ Church, Heaton Norris =

Redundant church in Greater Manchester, England

Coordinates: 53.4144°N 2.1678°W

Christ Church
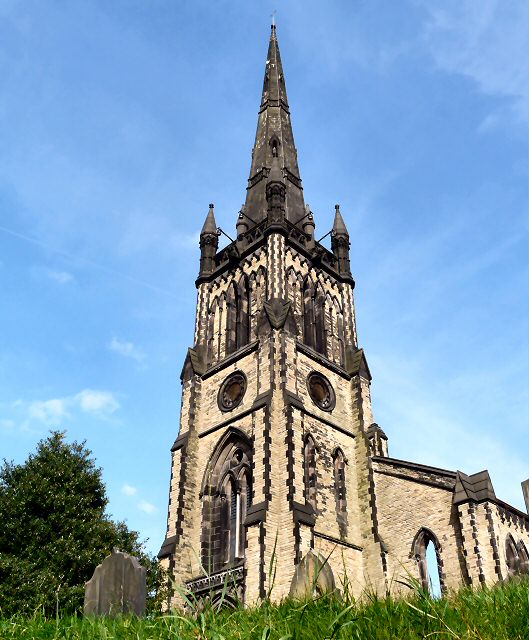
- The tower of the church in 2009

- Location in Greater Manchester
- OS grid reference: SJ 889 908
- Location: Wellington Road North, Heaton Norris, Stockport, Greater Manchester
- Country: England
- Denomination: Anglican
- Website: Churches Conservation Trust

Architecture
- Functional status: Redundant
- Heritage designation: Grade II
- Designated: 10 March 1975
- Architect: William Hayley
- Architectural type: Church
- Style: Gothic Revival (Early English style)
- Groundbreaking: 1844
- Completed: 1846
- Construction cost: c. £7,000 (equivalent to £706,000 in 2025)

Specifications
- Materials: Sandstone, Welsh slate

Christ Church consists of the remains of a redundant Anglican church on Wellington Road North in Heaton Norris, a suburb of Stockport, Greater Manchester, England. Only the tower and part of the walls of the aisles survive. They are located on the crest of a hill on the main road linking Stockport with Manchester. The church remains are recorded in the National Heritage List for England as a designated Grade II listed building, and are under the care of the Churches Conservation Trust.

== History ==
The church was built between 1844 and 1846 on land donated by Wilbraham Egerton of Tatton Park. It cost about £7,000 (equivalent to £706,000 in 2025), and was a Commissioners' church; the Church Building Commission providing a grant of £500 towards its building. It was designed by the Manchester architect William Hayley. As originally built, it consisted of a nave, north and south aisles, north and south transepts, a chancel, and a west tower with a spire.

By the 1970s the fabric of the church was in very poor condition, including the effects of dry rot. Attempts were made to convert it into a centre for the use of the community, but these were unsuccessful, and in 1977 it was badly damaged by a fire. Following this, it was demolished apart from the tower and spire, and parts of the adjoining walls. The foundations of the other walls have been preserved to show its original plan. Few of the fittings or furniture have survived; they were either destroyed in the fire or have been stolen. Several of the memorial plaques from within the church had, however, been removed prior to the fire and are now in All Saints' Church, Heaton Norris, along with the Christ Church Mother's Union banner, which was restored in 2014. The five clock bells, made by Warner in 1896, were stolen in 1977. The church was declared redundant on 20 July 1973, and the remains of the church were vested in the Trust on 23 May 1979.

== Architecture ==
Christ Church is constructed in yellow sandstone with a Welsh slate roof. Its architectural style is Early English. The tower is in four stages, and it has a tall, slender spire. On the west side of the lowest stage is a portal, and above this in the next stage is a west window with plate tracery. On the north and south sides of this stage are paired lancet windows. In the third stage are circular openings that formerly housed the clock faces and in the top stage are paired bell openings. On the summit is a pierced parapet, with tall pinnacles at the corners and smaller intermediate pinnacles. In the Buildings of England series, it is stated to be Hayley's "most ambitious surviving work".

== External features ==
The churchyard contains the war graves of five soldiers of the First World War.

== See also ==
- List of churches preserved by the Churches Conservation Trust in Northern England
- Listed buildings in Stockport
