= Listed buildings in Whenby =

Whenby is a civil parish in the county of North Yorkshire, England. It contains two listed buildings that are recorded in the National Heritage List for England. Of these, one is listed at Grade II*, the middle of the three grades, and the other is at Grade II, the lowest grade. The parish contains the village of Whenby and the surrounding area. Both the listed buildings are in the village, and consist of a church, and a farmhouse with an outbuilding.

== Key ==
Grade	Criteria
II*	Particularly important buildings of more than special interest
II	Buildings of national importance and special interest

== Buildings ==
Name and location	Photograph	Date	Notes	Grade
St Martin's Church; 54.12037°N 1.03638°W		15th century	The church has been altered and extended through the centuries, including restorations in1871 and in about 1910. It is built in ironstone with Welsh slate roofs, and consists of a nave and a chancel in one, and a continuous north aisle, a south porch and a west tower. The tower has three stages, a chamfered plinth, stepped angle buttresses, a blocked west doorway, windows on the middle stage, bell openings and an embattled parapet. There are also embattled parapets on the nave and the chancel. The porch is gabled, and has two two-light windows on each side, a monogram on the gable, and bench tables inside.	II*
The Manor House and outbuilding 54.12196°N 1.03966°W		Mid-18th century	The farmhouse is in orange-red brick on the front, with a floor band and dentilled eaves, and in sandstone elsewhere, with quoins. The roof is in pantile with raised verges and tumbled brickwork. There are two storeys and four bays. On the front is a doorway with a divided fanlight and sash windows, all the openings on the front with segmental arches. The outbuilding has reversed crow-stepped gables.	II
