= Hesketh Bank =

Village in Lancashire, England

Coordinates: 53.708°N 2.849°W

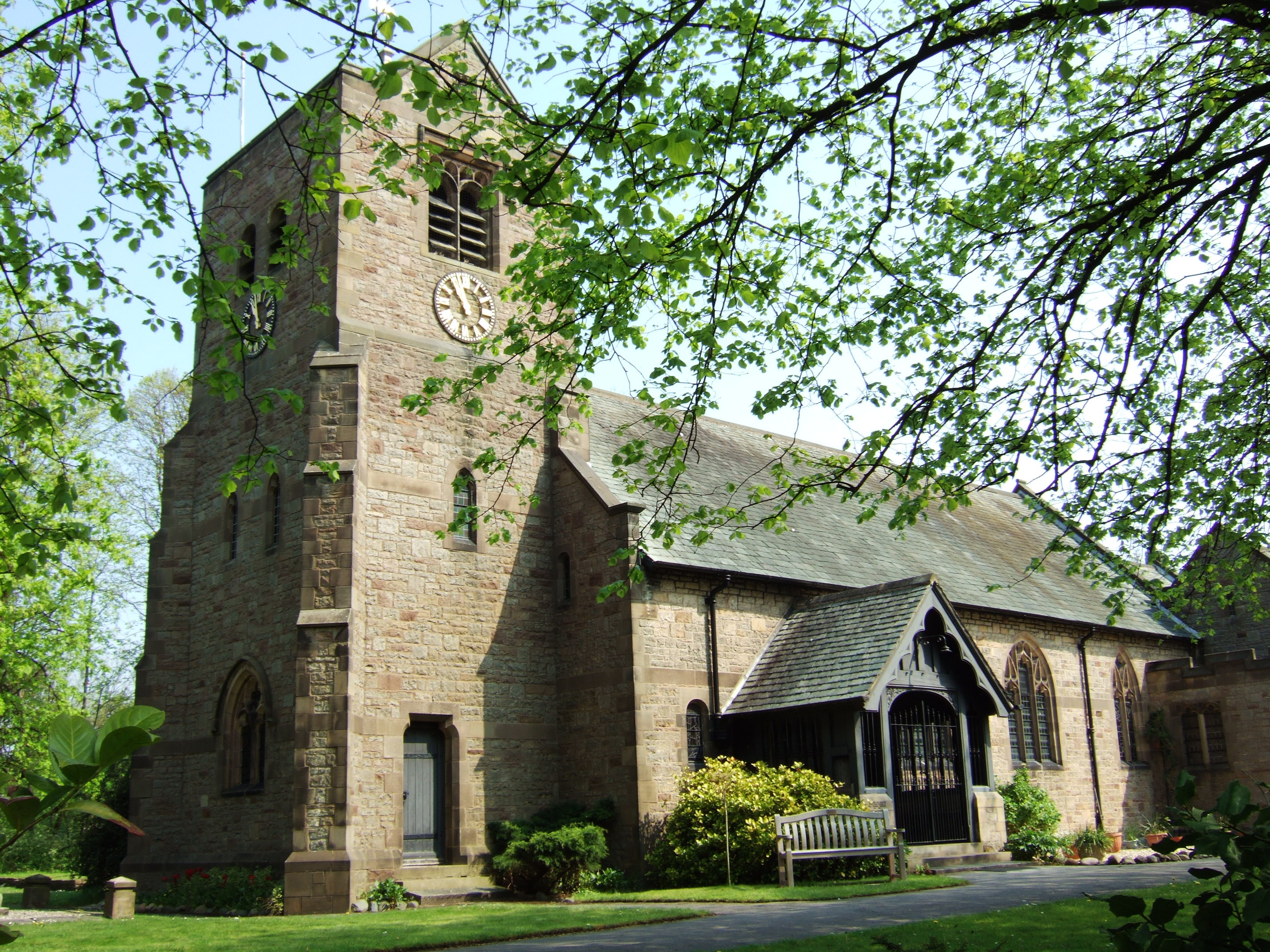
- All Saints Church

- Location in West Lancashire Location within Lancashire
- Population: 4,041 (2011)
- OS grid reference: SD439238
- Civil parish: Hesketh with Becconsall
- District: West Lancashire
- Shire county: Lancashire
- Region: North West
- Country: England
- Sovereign state: United Kingdom
- Post town: PRESTON
- Postcode district: PR4
- Dialling code: 01772
- Police: Lancashire
- Fire: Lancashire
- Ambulance: North West
- UK Parliament: Southport

Hesketh Bank is a village in the West Lancashire district of Lancashire, England, 7 miles (11 km) north-east of Southport and 7 miles (11 km) south-west of Preston. The village is within the civil parish of Hesketh-with-Becconsall, which includes the village of Becconsall immediately to the south and which borders the Ribble Estuary to the north. The parish had a population of 4,187 at the 2021 census. Hesketh Bank, Becconsall, and the village of Tarleton to the south form a single built-up area with a population of 8,755.

== Toponymy ==
Hesketh was first recorded in 1288 as Heschath. The name is derived either from Old Norse hest shei meaning "race course", or from a plural of the Welsh hesg, meaning "sedges".

== History ==
The village of Hesketh is known to have existed in the 13th century. Hesketh Bank had a substantial brick-making industry using the local boulder clay, bricks being transported by the West Lancashire Railway which opened in 1878.

Due to its geographical location, close to the cities of Preston and Liverpool, the village suffered during the Second World War. Stray bombs hit the old church in 1943, and landed along Becconsall Lane, causing extensive damage to the housing there.

== Former brickworks site and regeneration ==
The former brickworks site at Hesketh Bank, historically associated with brick production and associated transport infrastructure, has been the focus of heritage-led regeneration proposals in the early 21st century. The site, formerly operated as Henry Alty’s Brickworks, played a significant role in the local economy and was linked to river and rail transport networks used for the distribution of building materials.

In recent years, parts of the former brickworks land have been incorporated into proposals for Becconsall Heritage Park, a long-term project intended to create a publicly accessible heritage and environmental space. The project aims to preserve and interpret the industrial and social history of the area while providing woodland, walking routes and educational features. Development of the park has been planned in stages, with early phases involving community engagement and environmental planting.

Strategic planning documents produced for West Lancashire have identified the former brickworks and surrounding land as part of a wider landscape suitable for recreational and environmental enhancement. A feasibility study examining the potential for a linear park between Tarleton and Hesketh Bank highlighted opportunities for improved public access, biodiversity enhancement, and the reuse of former industrial land, including areas adjacent to the brickworks site.

The site has also been subject to residential development proposals. Planning documentation, including design and access statements for the former brickworks land, has outlined housing-led redevelopment options while referencing site constraints, heritage considerations, and surrounding infrastructure. These proposals form part of broader discussions on land use and development within Hesketh Bank.

=== Second World War ===
According to the Becconsall Heritage Park project, a World War II air-raid shelter survives on the park site, and volunteers have been excavating the shelter’s entrances as part of site restoration work.

== Landmarks ==
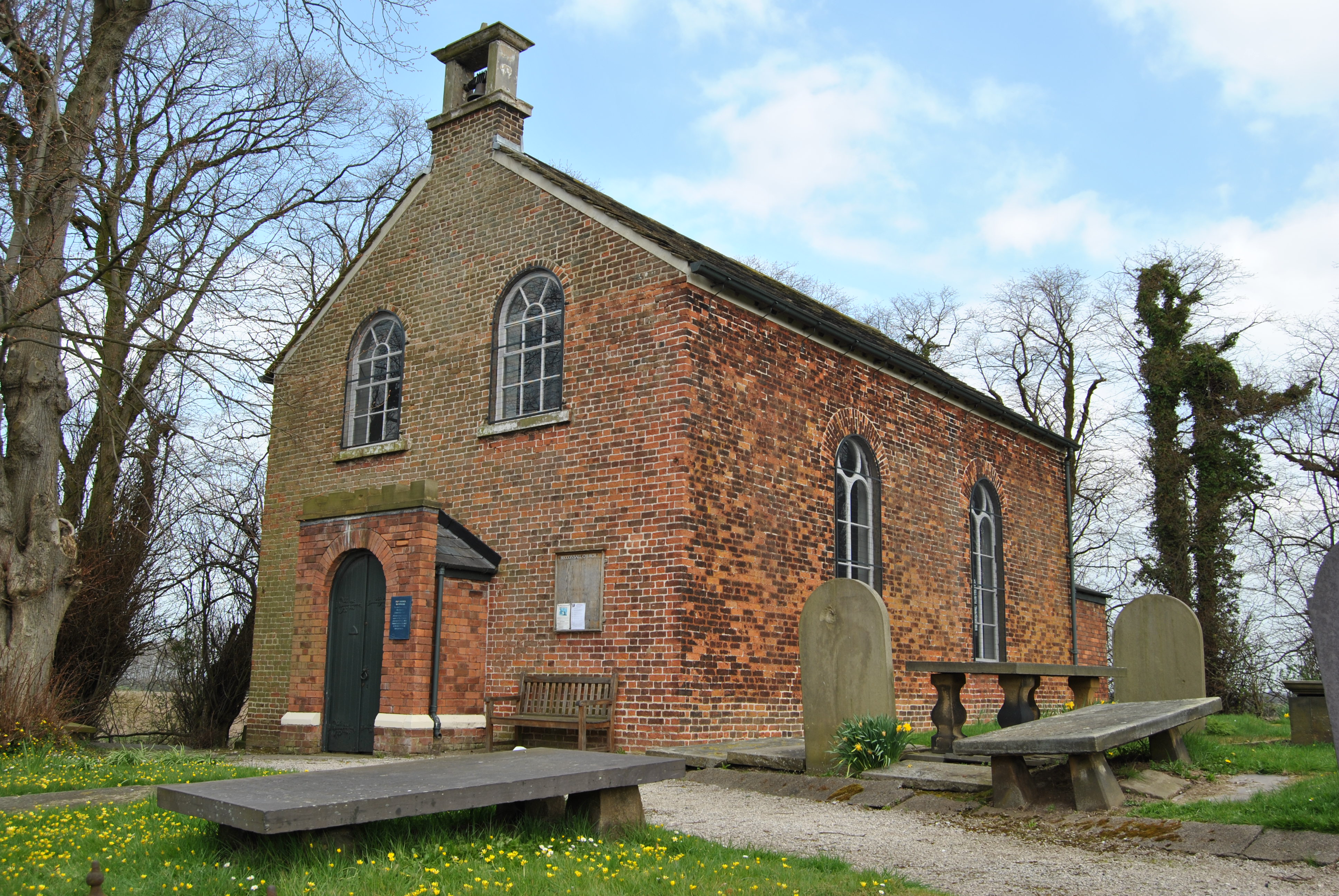
Becconsall Old Church in April 2010

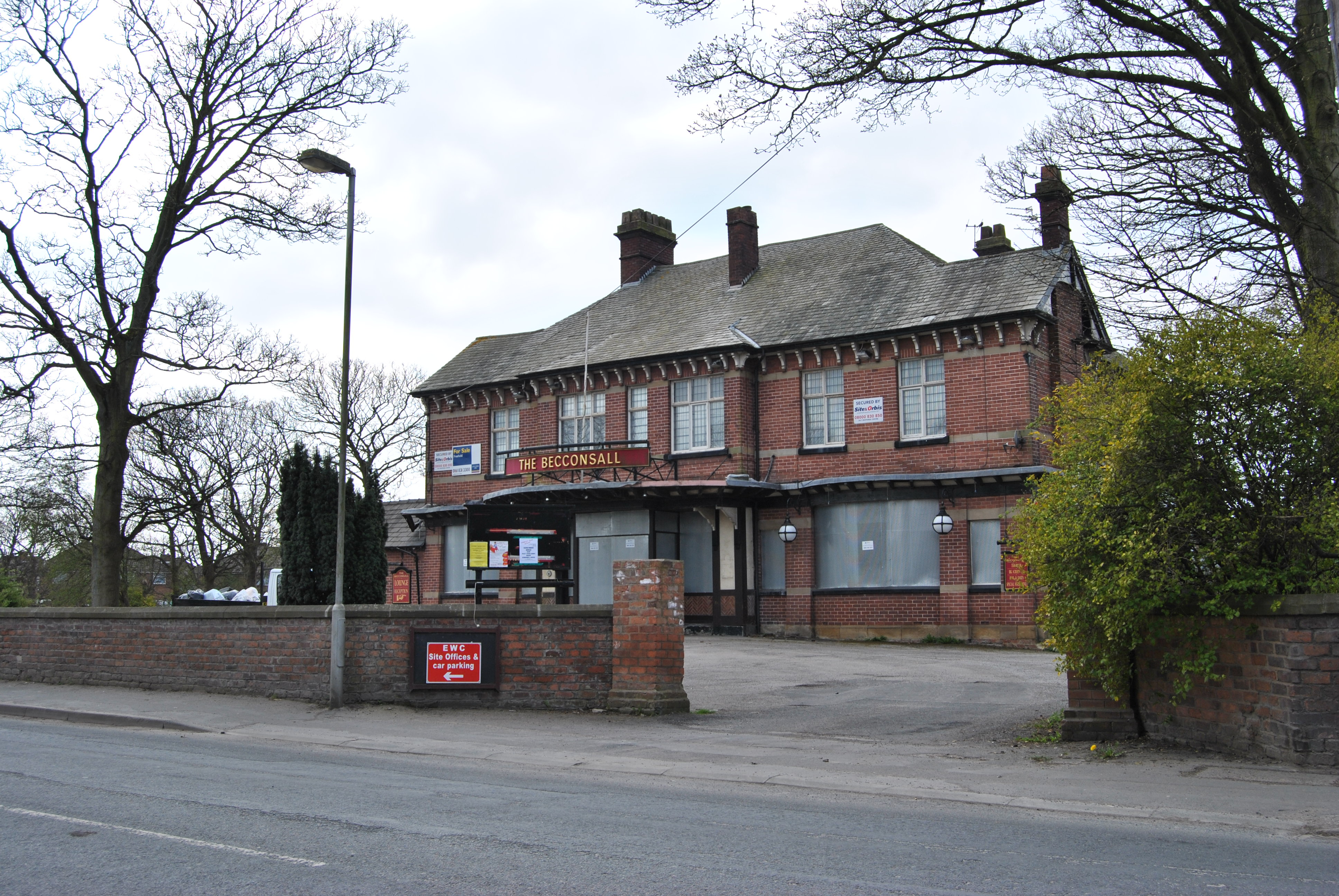
Pub

The village has some architectural gems such as Becconsall Old Church which was hit by bomb shrapnel during World War II, All Saints Church on Station Road replaced the old church and is of some architectural significance as is the Becconsall Public House, which shut in June 2009 and was subsequently demolished. The former pub site was redeveloped as housing, keeping the name alive as Becconsall Gardens.

The West Lancashire Light Railway is a narrow gauge railway that is located in Hesketh Bank at the site of the former brick works, near but not on the line of the former railway.

== Geography ==
Hesketh Bank lies just to the north of the larger village of Tarleton and the village of Banks (North Meols).

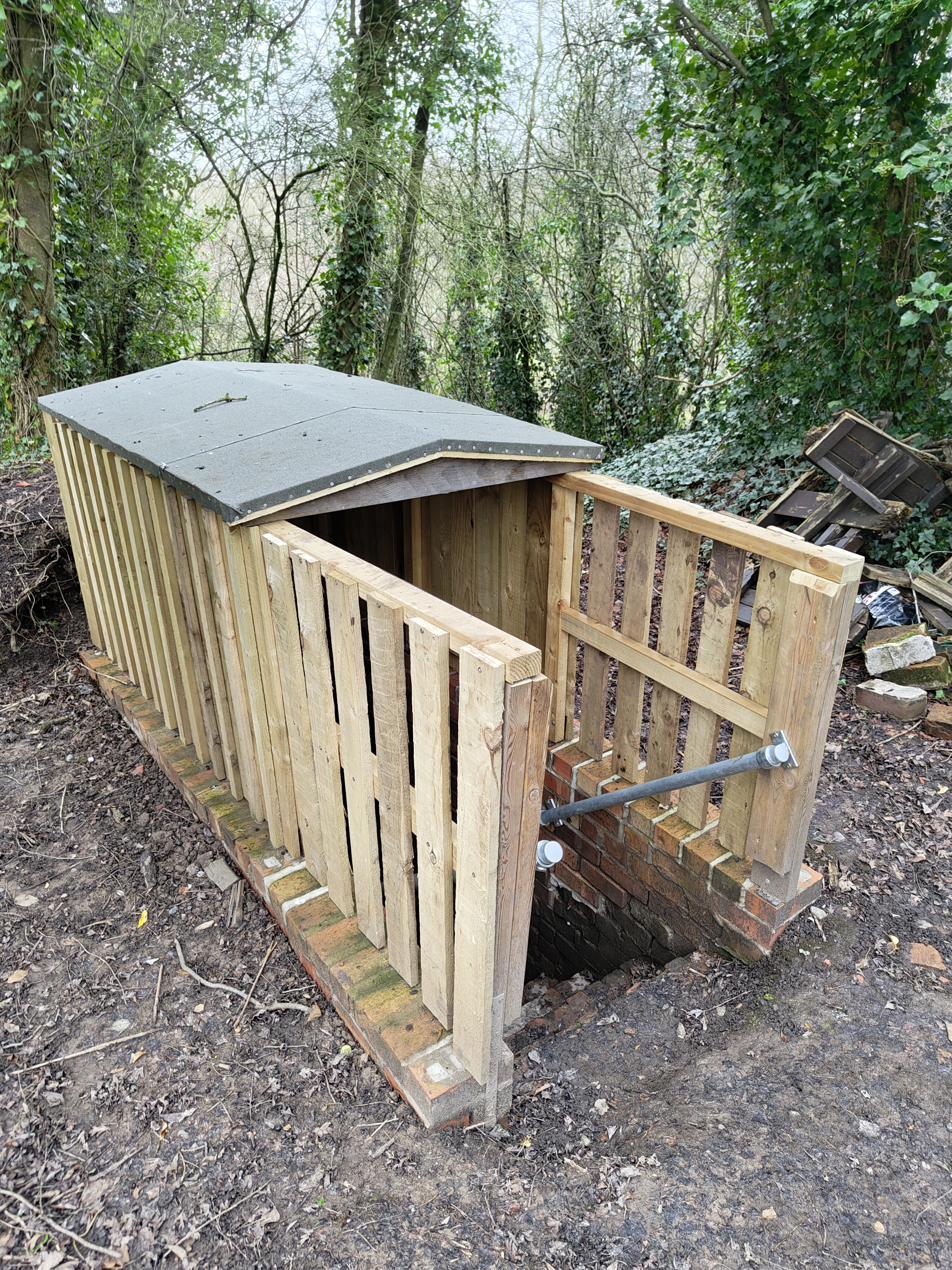

During the Second World War, an air-raid shelter was constructed on land associated with the brickworks at Hesketh Bank to provide protection for workers and local residents during bombing raids. The shelter reflects the wider use of reinforced concrete communal shelters built across industrial and transport-linked sites in Lancashire during the war, particularly where employment or strategic infrastructure was concentrated.

Local historical accounts describe the shelter as a substantial underground structure, designed to withstand nearby blast effects and provide short-term refuge during air-raid warnings. Its location near the brickworks reflects the perceived vulnerability of industrial facilities and associated transport routes to aerial attack, even in rural and semi-rural communities such as Hesketh Bank. Although the village did not experience sustained bombing, the presence of the shelter illustrates wartime civil defence preparations and the impact of national air-raid precaution policy on smaller settlements.

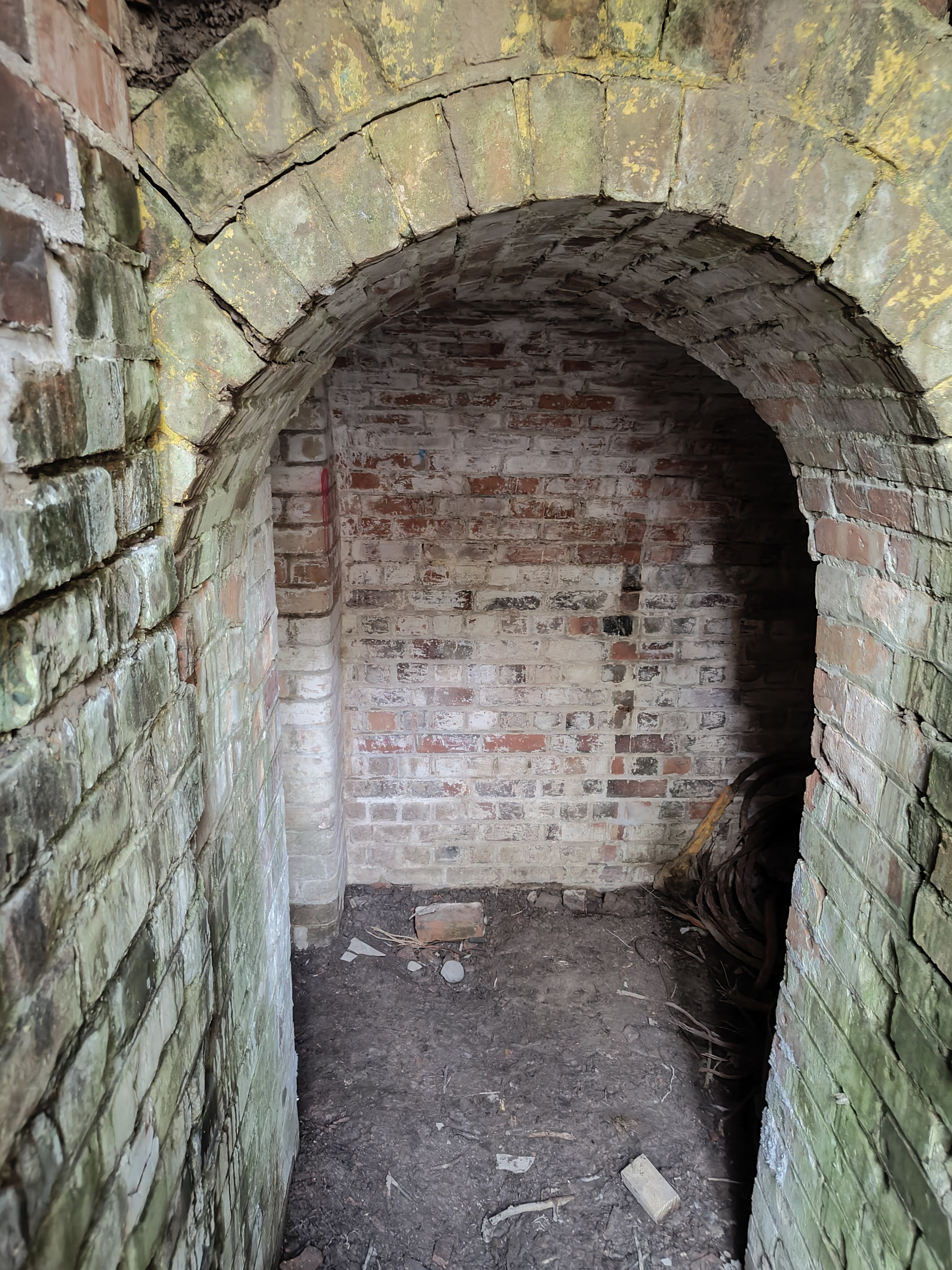
Inside the air raid shelter in Hesketh Bank

The remains of the shelter have been referenced in later heritage and regeneration documentation, where it is identified as a surviving feature of the site’s wartime history. Heritage-led proposals for the former brickworks area have noted the shelter’s potential value as an interpretive element, contributing to public understanding of civilian life and industrial continuity during the Second World War.

== Economy ==
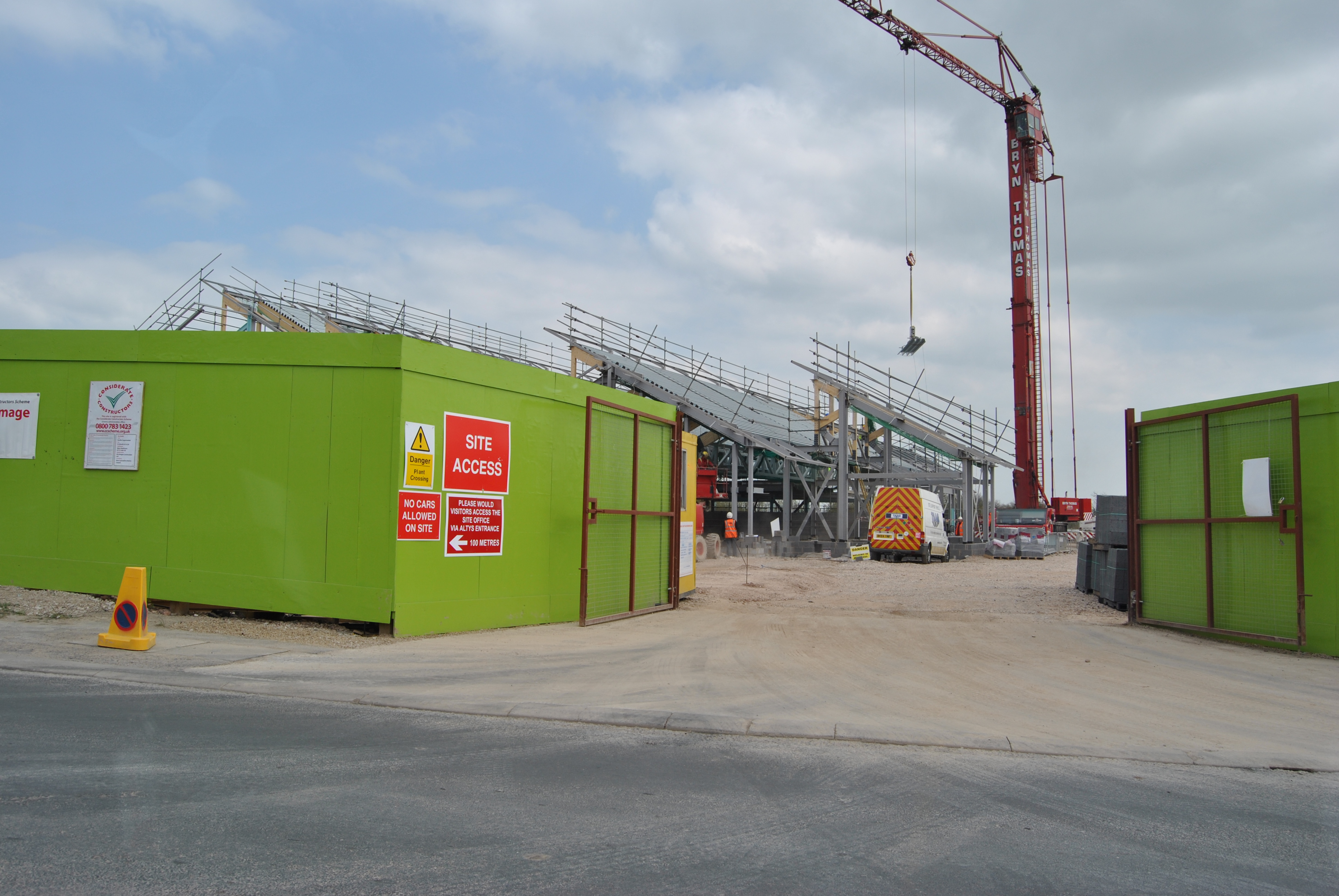
Booths store under construction April 2010 on the railway station site

Due to the village's position on the West Lancashire Coastal Plain it has a rich soil, suitable for the farming of flowers and vegetables – this is still the main economic activity in the area.

== Transport ==
The village is located just off the A59 Preston to Liverpool road and the A565 Southport Road has meant it has also developed as a commuter town.

Hesketh Bank railway station was once a stop on the West Lancashire Railway, which ran between Preston and Southport. The railway opened in 1878 was closed almost a century later, in 1964. The station site is now occupied by a housing estate.

== Leisure ==
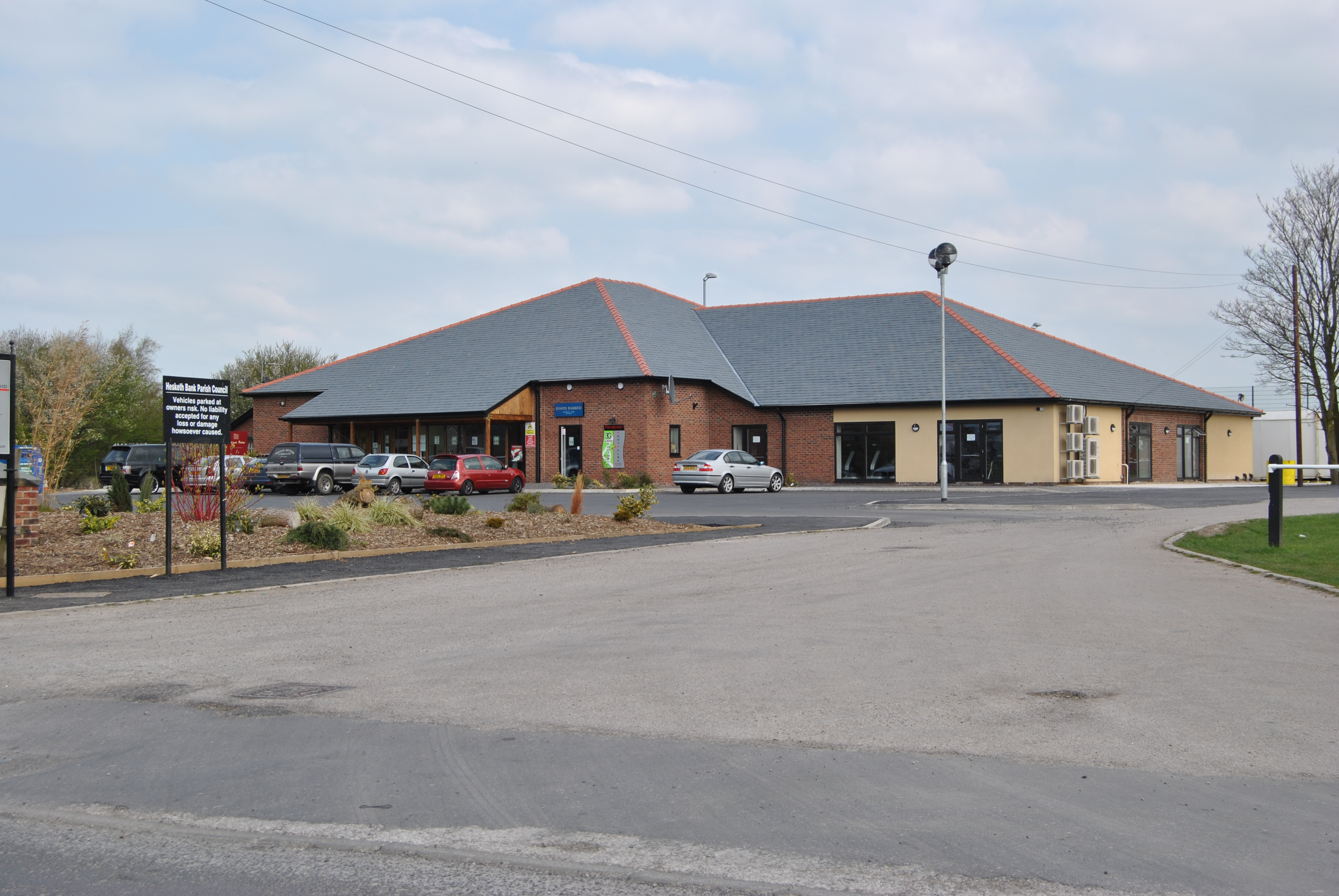
Hesketh Bank Football Club in April 2010

The village is home to football, cricket, badminton and crown green bowls clubs, the Hesketh Bank Silver Band and the West Lancashire Light Railway.

== See also ==
- Listed buildings in Hesketh-with-Becconsall
