= St Martin's Church, Whenby =

Coordinates: 54.1204°N 1.0364°W

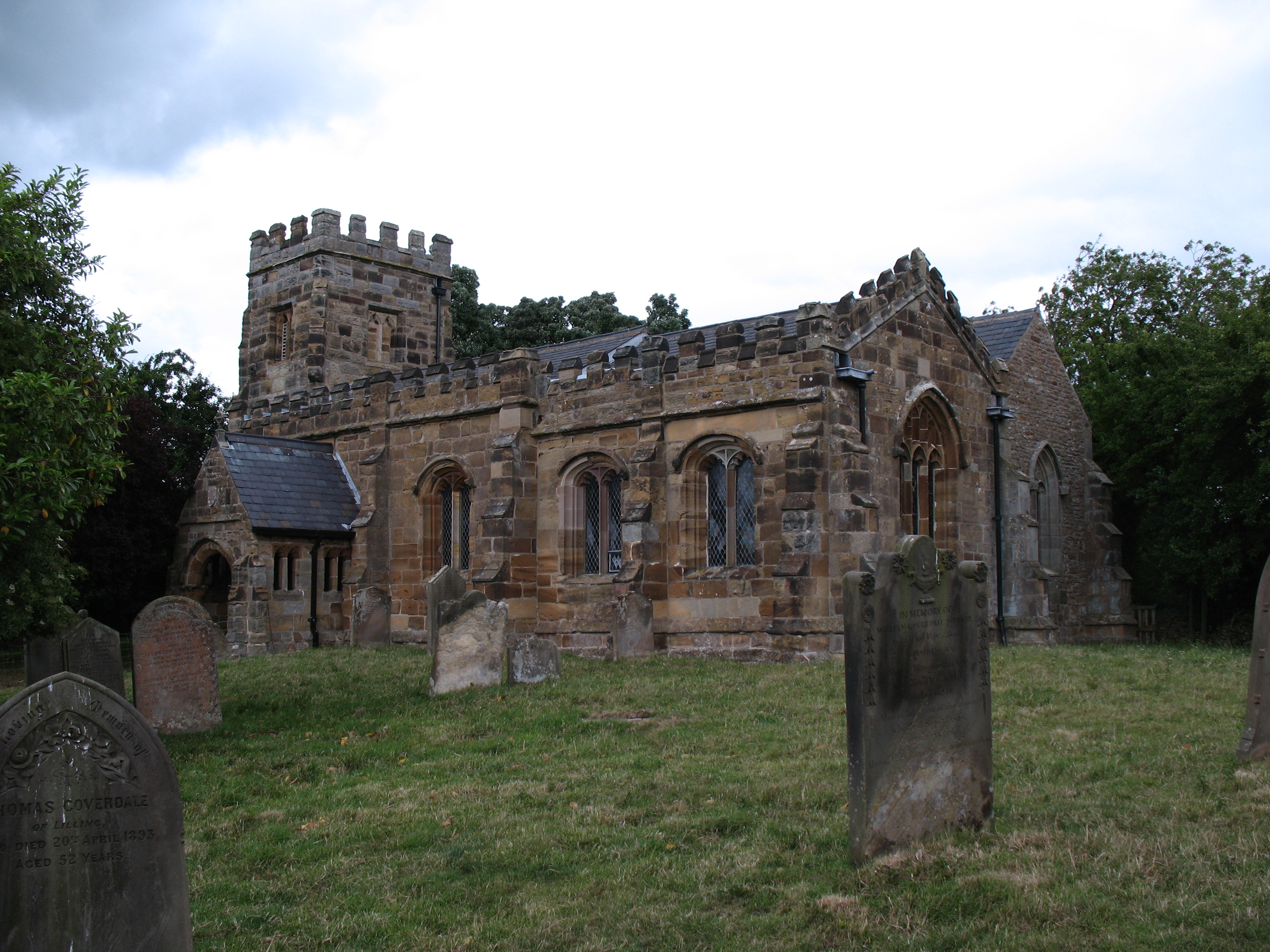
- St Martin's Church, Whenby, from the southeast

- Location in North Yorkshire
- OS grid reference: SE 630 698
- Location: Whenby, North Yorkshire
- Country: England
- Denomination: Anglican
- Website: Churches Conservation Trust

History
- Dedication: Saint Martin

Architecture
- Functional status: Redundant
- Heritage designation: Grade II*
- Designated: 11 May 1960
- Architectural type: Church
- Style: Gothic

Specifications
- Materials: Ironstone, Welsh slate roofs

St Martin's Church is a redundant Anglican church in the village of Whenby, North Yorkshire, England. It is recorded in the National Heritage List for England as a designated Grade II* listed building, and is under the care of the Churches Conservation Trust.

== History ==
It is considered that the church was reconstructed in the 15th century on the site of an earlier church. It was extensively restored between 1871 and 1910. St Martin's was declared redundant on 1 April 1982, and was vested in the Trust on 19 October 1983.

== Architecture ==
=== Structure ===
The church is constructed in ironstone with Welsh slate roofs. Its plan consists of a two-bay nave, a two-bay chancel, an aisle running to the north of the nave and the chancel, a south porch and a west tower. The architectural style is Perpendicular. The east end of the aisle forms a chapel. The tower is in two stages, it has angle buttresses and an embattled parapet. In the bottom stage is a blocked west doorway with a pointed arch. The upper stage has a single-light bell opening on the north side, and two-light bell openings on the other sides. The nave and aisle have two-light windows and a north door. In the chancel is a three-light east window, and two-light windows on its south wall. The chapel has a two-light east and north windows. The porch is considered to be particularly elaborate. The exterior of the church is embattled throughout. Inside the church is a tower arch, but no chancel arch. Between the nave and the aisle is a two-bay arcade, and a similar arcade divides the chapel from the chancel.

=== Fittings and furniture ===
There are oak screens between the nave and the chancel, and between the aisle and the chapel. The former screen dates from the 15th century, while the latter screen is Jacobean in style. In the south wall of the chancel is a piscina. The font dates from the 15th century and has an octagonal bowl. The oak benches in the nave date probably from the 16th century. The church contains a parish chest from the same period. Over the south door are the coat of arms of George III dated 1821, which is a year after he died. In the north wall of the tower is the cast iron door of a safe. There is a ring of three bells. The oldest of these is dated from about 1380. The others were cast in 1694 by Samuel I Smith, and by John Warner & Sons in 1913.

== See also ==
- Grade II* listed churches in North Yorkshire (district)
- Listed buildings in Whenby
- List of churches preserved by the Churches Conservation Trust in Northern England
