= St Thomas' Church, Friarmere =

Coordinates: 53.5782°N 2.0284°W

St Thomas' Church, Friarmere (Heights Chapel)
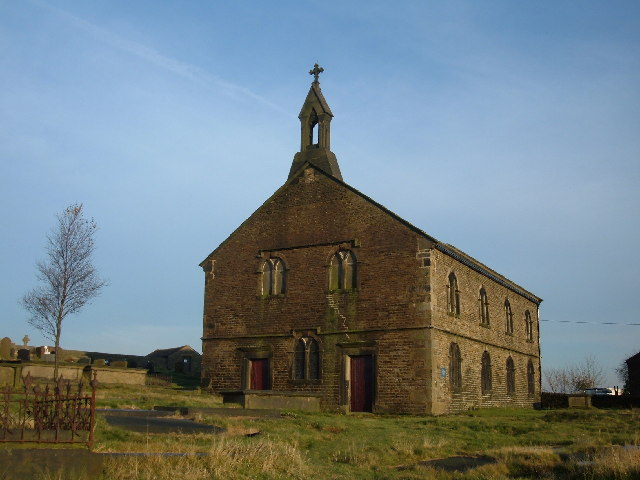
- St Thomas' Church, Friarmere, from the southwest

- Location in Greater Manchester
- OS grid reference: SD 982 090
- Location: Delph, Greater Manchester
- Country: England
- Denomination: Anglican
- Website: Churches Conservation Trust

Architecture
- Functional status: Redundant
- Heritage designation: Grade II*
- Designated: 19 June 1967
- Architectural type: Church
- Style: Georgian
- Groundbreaking: 1765
- Completed: 19th century

Specifications
- Materials: Stone, with stone slate roofs

St Thomas' Church, Friarmere, also known as Heights Chapel, is a redundant Anglican church standing on a hillside overlooking the village of Delph, Greater Manchester, England. It is recorded in the National Heritage List for England as a designated Grade II* listed building, and is under the care of the Churches Conservation Trust.

== History ==
The church was built in 1765 to serve a growing local population who otherwise had to go to church in Rochdale or Saddleworth. A bellcote was added to the exterior in the 19th century, and fittings were added to the interior during the same century. Many of these fittings were removed to the new parish church in Delph when the old church was closed. The old church was declared redundant on 16 April 1970, and was vested in the Trust on 24 May 1972.

== Architecture ==
St Thomas' is constructed in stone with a stone slate roof. Its plan consists of a simple rectangular nave in two storeys, a small chancel with canted sides, and a vestry wing. The nave is four bays long by two bays wide, and has quoins at the corners. The west front has two doors over which are lintels inscribed with the date 1765. Between these is a round-headed two-light window and in the upper storey are two similar windows. Above these is a coped gable on which is a single bellcote surmounted by a cross. Along the north and south sides are two tiers of four windows similar to those on the west front. There is a Venetian window on the east wall of the chancel and a similar window on the east wall of the vestry. Inside the church are galleries on three sides, which are carried on Tuscan columns. On the walls are plaque memorials to the Buckley family.

== External features ==
The churchyard contains the war graves of a Royal Scots Fusiliers soldier of World War I and a Royal Navy officer of World War II.

== See also ==
- Grade II* listed buildings in Greater Manchester
- List of churches preserved by the Churches Conservation Trust in Northern England
