= Ireby Old Church =

Coordinates: 54.7427°N 3.2071°W

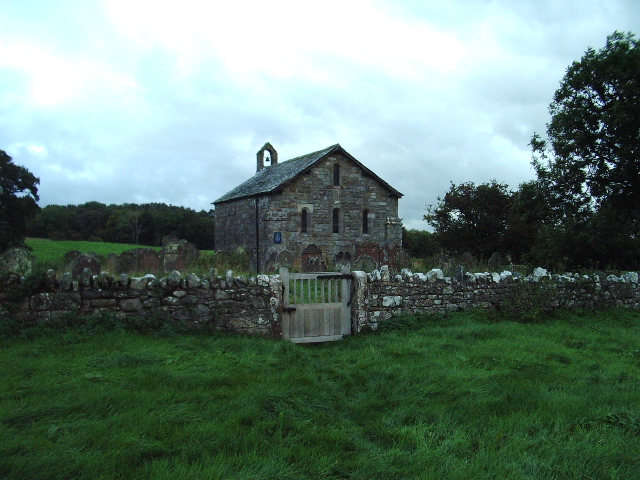
- Ireby Old Church from the east

- Location in Cumbria
- OS grid reference: NY 224 394
- Location: Near Ireby, Cumbria
- Country: England
- Denomination: Anglican
- Website: Churches Conservation Trust

Architecture
- Functional status: Redundant
- Heritage designation: Grade I
- Designated: 11 April 1967
- Architect: Ewan Christian (restoration)
- Architectural type: Church
- Style: Norman
- Groundbreaking: 12th century
- Completed: 1880
- Closed: 1971

Specifications
- Materials: Sandstone and limestone blocks, slate roof

Ireby Old Church is a redundant Anglican church, of which only the chancel remains. It stands in an isolated position 1 mile (2 km) to the west of the hamlet of Ireby, Cumbria, England. It is recorded in the National Heritage List for England as a designated Grade I listed building, and is under the care of the Churches Conservation Trust.

== History ==
The church was built in the 12th century, altered in 1845–46, and restored in 1880 by Ewan Christian. In 1845–46 the nave, north aisle and porch were demolished. At this time the font, piscina and some carvings were removed to a new church built in the village. The church was declared redundant on 11 June 1971, and was vested in the Trust on 7 November 1972.

== Architecture ==
Ireby Old Church is constructed in blocks of sandstone and limestone, and it has a green slate roof. Only the former two-bay chancel remains. At its west end is an open bellcote. The door is at the west end in the blocked former chancel arch. It has a 19th-century surround over which is a re-used 12th-century tympanum and a built-in medieval grave slab. In the north wall is a blocked doorway, and a square window dating from the 18th century. The east wall contains three small round-headed windows, with one similar window above; this wall contains more built-in medieval slabs. Inside the church, the east wall contains a restored three-bay arcade. Also built into the east wall is a stone altar shelf over which is a carved medieval cross. There are two blocked 13th-century windows in the south wall; these are not visible from the exterior. Memorials include a wall plaque dated 1626 and an aedicule (small shrine) dated 1769.

== External features ==
In the churchyard are two 13th-century octagonal columns with capitals that formerly stood in the nave of the church. In 1845–46 they were moved to the village where they acted as gateposts for a house. In 1933–34, excavations revealed the former bases of these columns and, following the 1972 restoration, the columns were returned to their original positions, now to the west of the church. They are listed Grade II*.

== See also ==
- Grade I listed churches in Cumbria
- Grade I listed buildings in Cumbria
- Listed buildings in Ireby and Uldale
- List of churches preserved by the Churches Conservation Trust in Northern England
