= Listed buildings in Hesketh-with-Becconsall =

Hesketh-with-Becconsall is a civil parish in the West Lancashire district of Lancashire, England. It contains six listed buildings that are recorded in the National Heritage List for England. All the listed buildings are designated at Grade II, the lowest of the three grades, which is applied to "buildings of national importance and special interest". The parish contains the villages of Becconsall and Hesketh Bank and the surrounding countryside. The listed buildings comprise three houses, a church, and a sundial in the churchyard,

== Buildings ==
Name and location	Photograph	Date	Notes
Bank Farmhouse; 53.70542°N 2.86031°W	—	1684	The farmhouse is mainly in brick with some stone, and has a felted roof. It has two storeys and three bays with a two-storey gabled porch on the front. The porch contains a doorway converted into a window, a datestone, and a small window. The windows have segmental heads and most are casements.
Ferry House; 53.70216°N 2.83191°W	—	Early 18th century	The former house of the ferryman is in brick with a roof mainly of slate and some stone-slate. It has a T-shaped plan, two storeys and two bays. Most of the windows are casements with segmental heads. The doorway also has a segmental head. At the rear is a full-height gabled stair turret.
Becconsall Hall Farmhouse; 53.70315°N 2.83281°W	—	Mid to late 18th century	The farmhouse has incorporated some 17th-century material. It is in brick with stone quoins and has a slate roof. There are two storeys and two bays, and on the front is a porch that was added later. The windows have segmental heads, and most contain casements. The left gable wall contains a re-set datestone, and at the rear is a two-storey porch.
Old Church of All Saints; 53.70250°N 2.83114°W		1764	The church is in brick with a stone-slate roof, and has a rectangular two-bay plan with a small sanctuary, and a small vestry at the northeast corner. At the west end is a 20th-century brick porch and a round-headed chamfered doorway. Above this are two round-headed gallery windows, and on the apex of the gable is a small bellcote. On the sides of the church are two round-headed windows, and at the east end is a large Venetian window. Inside the church is a west gallery. The church is now redundant.
Sundial; 53.70241°N 2.83121°W	—	1776	The sundial is in the churchyard of the Old Church of All Saints. It is in stone, and has a square baluster-shaped pedestal. On the top is a dated brass plate; the gnomon is missing.
War memorial 53.70266°N 2.84030°W		c. 1920	The war memorial is in the churchyard of All Saints' Church, near the west end of the church. It is in granite, and has a two-stepped square base, a plinth, and a tapering shaft carrying a Celtic cross, which is decorated with interlace and knotwork. There is an inscription on the front face of the plinth, and on the front of the shaft are the names of those lost in the World Wars. The memorial stands in a square enclosure surrounded by a kerb that has a stone post with a pyramidal cap at each corner.
