= Whenby =

Village and civil parish in North Yorkshire, England

Coordinates: 54.1203°N 1.03676°W

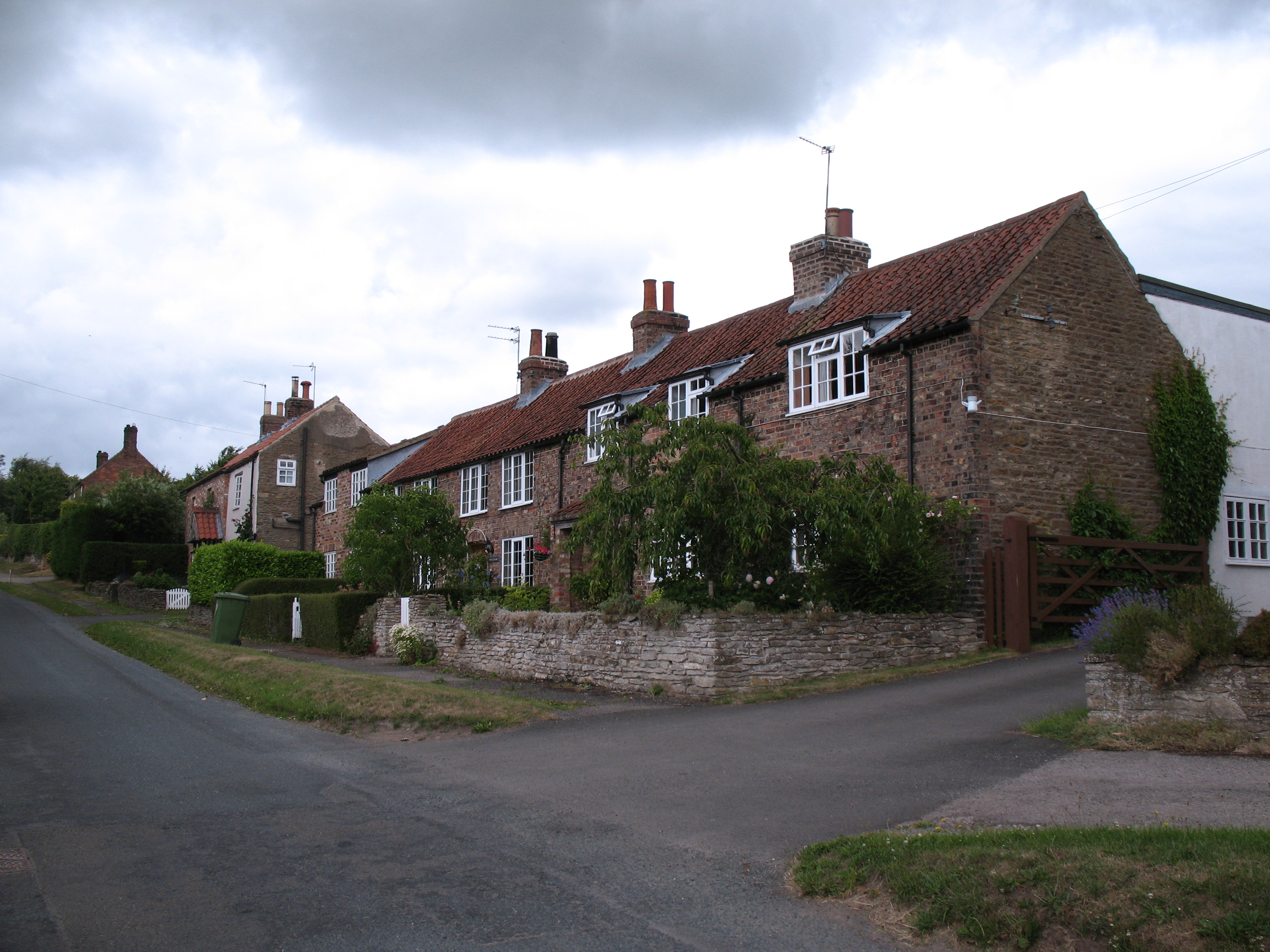
- Main Street, Whenby

- Location within North Yorkshire
- Population: 222 (2011 census)
- OS grid reference: SE630698
- Unitary authority: North Yorkshire
- Region: Yorkshire and the Humber
- Country: England
- Sovereign state: United Kingdom
- Post town: York
- Postcode district: YO61
- Police: North Yorkshire
- Fire: North Yorkshire
- Ambulance: Yorkshire
- UK Parliament: Wetherby and Easingwold

Whenby is a civil parish and village in North Yorkshire, England, 12 miles (19 km) north of York and 8 miles (13 km) east of Easingwold. The village and parish lies between Sheriff Hutton and Brandsby, just south of the Howardian Hills. According to the 2011 census, the parish has an area of 4,860 acres (1,966 ha),.

The 15th century parish church was declared redundant in 1983. It is now maintained by the Churches Conservation Trust.

== History ==
Although Whenby was recorded in the Domesday Book of 1086, no particular details are shown about the settlement. The first part of the name derives from Old Norse Kona (a woman) and the suffix by, which is Old English for steadings or farm, so literally Woman's Farm.

The area was in the possession of the de Nevil family in the 13th century, and passed through several noble families (Moryn, Barton, Thomas etc) until it passed through marriage to the Radclyffe family of Derwentwater. However, the lands around Whenby were forfeited to the crown in 1715 after James Radclyffe, 3rd Earl of Derwentwater was found guilty of treason. Radclyffe took part in the Jacobite Uprising, was tried, found guilty, attainted and executed.

== Geography ==
Whenby has approximately 20 houses, most of these are old cottages, and all but three are on the north and east side of Main Street. All surrounding land is farmland, and strict planning permissions prevent any development. The surface is undulating, and the soil generally a rich clay loam, and the parish is an average of 200 feet (61 m) above sea level. Whilst parts of the parish are within the Howardian Hills AONB, the village itself is just outside it to the south.

== Parish church ==
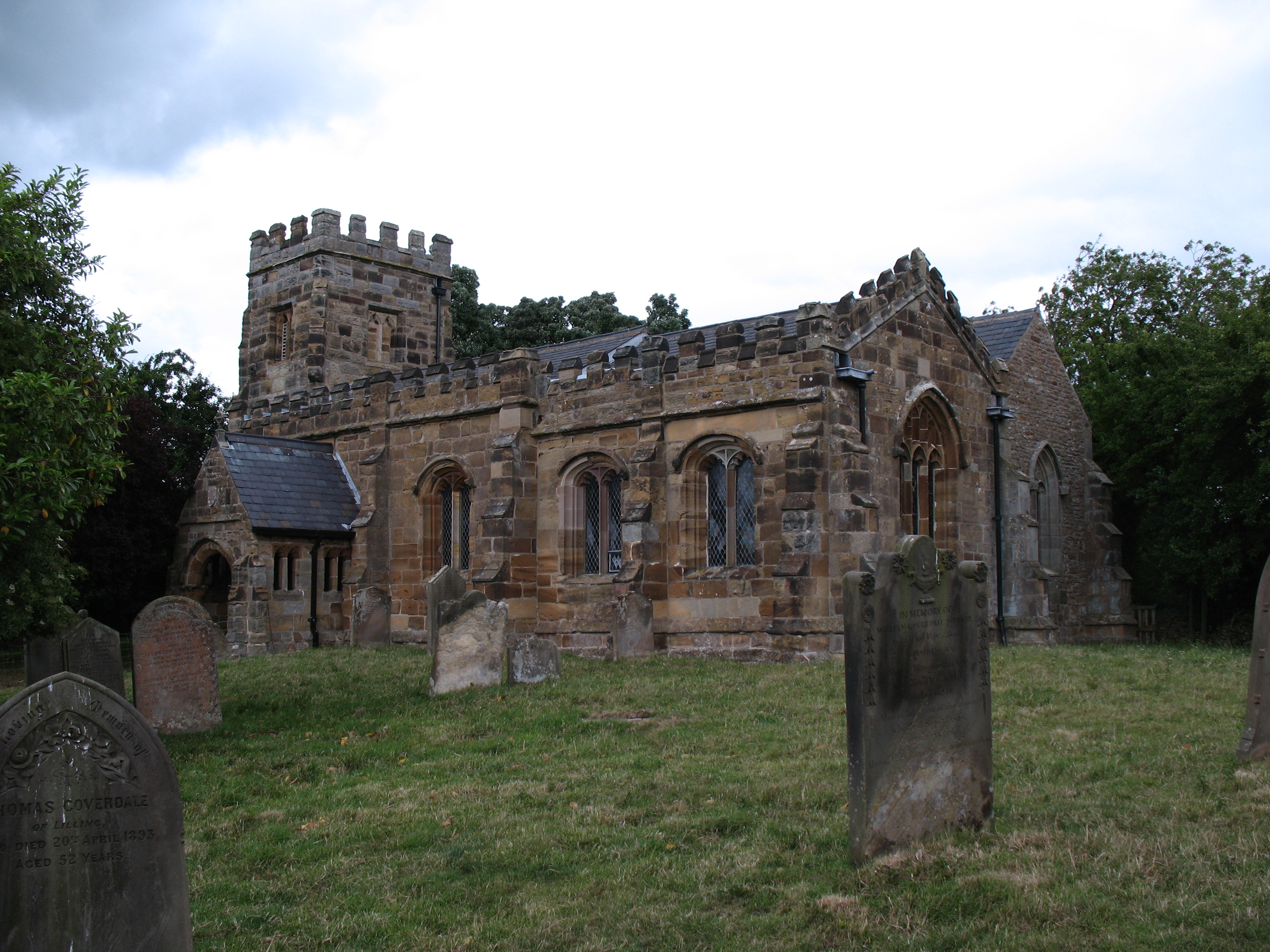
St Martin's Church

St Martin's Church is a redundant Anglican church, which still has its stained glass windows and fittings. It was built around 1400, although a church has existed on the site since 1250. St Martin’s has a chancel, north aisle, porch, nave, mortuary chapel, and a tower, containing three bells. It was restored, at a cost of £700, in 1871, when a north aisle of stone was added. The principal entrance is by the north porch, though Nikolaus Pevsner described the south porch as its best feature. There is a doorway of ancient date, which is generally supposed to have been used for public access to the church, or in connection with the priest's house. It is a grade II* listed building. Although declared redundant in October 1983, it still forms part of the ecclesiastical parish of Dalby with Whenby, and is maintained by the Churches Conservation Trust.

== Governance ==
In the Domesday Book, the settlement was recorded as in the Hundred of Bulford, later recorded as the wapentake of Bulmer. It was recorded as a parish within the Easingwold district of the North Riding of Yorkshire until 1974, when it was moved into the new county of North Yorkshire. From 1974 to 2023 it was part of Hambleton District. It is now administered by the unitary North Yorkshire Council.

The area is represented in the United Kingdom Parliament as part of the Thirsk and Malton constituency.

== See also ==
- Listed buildings in Whenby
