= High Ireby =

Coordinates: 54.7238°N 3.1957°W

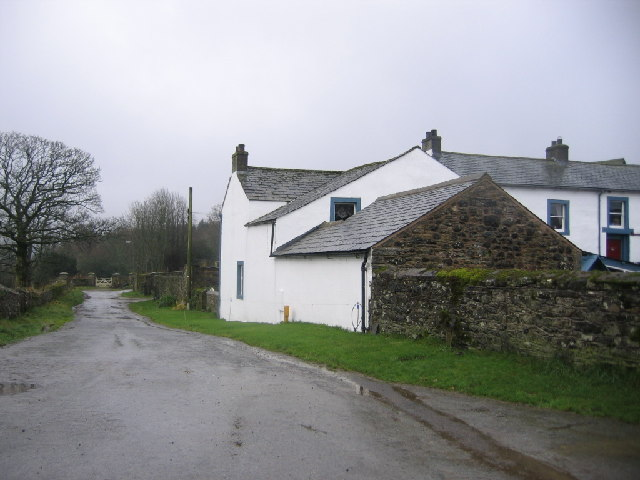

- Location within Cumbria
- Civil parish: Ireby and Uldale
- Unitary authority: Cumberland
- Ceremonial county: Cumbria
- Region: North West
- Country: England
- Sovereign state: United Kingdom
- Police: Cumbria
- Fire: Cumbria
- Ambulance: North West

High Ireby is a hamlet in the civil parish of Ireby and Uldale, in the Cumberland district, in the ceremonial county of Cumbria, England. It is 15 miles from Carlisle.

== History ==
The name "Ireby" means 'Irish farm/settlement'. The manor was "Ireby Alta" or "High Ireby". High Ireby was historically a township in the ancient parish of Ireby, in 1866, the legal definition of 'parish' was changed to be the areas used for administering the poor laws, and so High Ireby became a civil parish. In 1894 High Ireby became part of the Wigton Rural District of Cumberland, on 1 April 1934 the parish was abolished to form Ireby. At the 1931 census (the last before the abolition of the parish), High Ireby had a population of 125. In 1974 High Ireby became part of Allerdale non-metropolitan district in the non-metropolitan county of Cumbria. In 2023 High Ireby became part of Cumberland district.

The de Ireby family held the manor for several generations.
