= Ireby, Cumbria =

Village in Cumbria, England

Coordinates: 54.739°N 03.184°W

Ireby
- Village
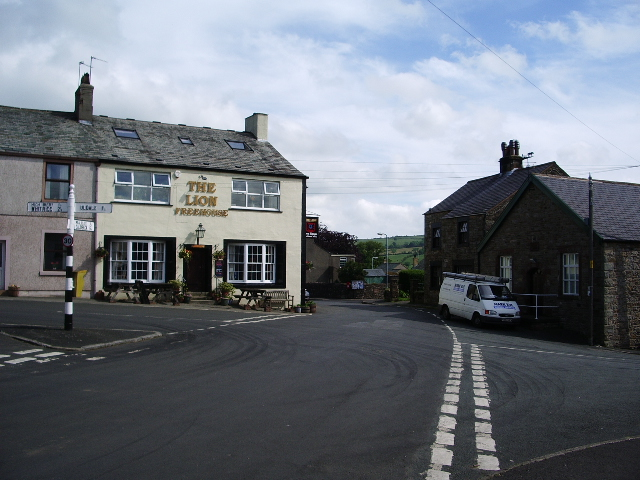
- The Lion public house and crossroads, Ireby

- Location within Cumbria
- OS grid reference: NY238390
- Civil parish: Ireby and Uldale
- Unitary authority: Cumberland
- Ceremonial county: Cumbria
- Region: North West
- Country: England
- Sovereign state: United Kingdom
- Post town: WIGTON
- Postcode district: CA7
- Dialling code: 016973
- Police: Cumbria
- Fire: Cumbria
- Ambulance: North West
- UK Parliament: Penrith and Solway

Ireby is a village in the Cumberland district of Cumbria, England with a population of around 180. It is located above the River Ellen, just outside the Lake District National Park, in the area locally called Back o'Skiddaw, with views to the Caldbeck Fells. The nearest towns are Wigton, 7 miles (11 km) away, and Cockermouth and Keswick, both 12 miles (19 km) away.

It was granted a market charter in 1237.

== Amenities ==
Ireby has two village halls, the main Globe Assembly Hall and the smaller Women's Institutes Hall.

Ireby had a music festival attracting a wide range of popular musicians and capacity audiences. In 2010, the Festival had Kate Rusby playing. Due to restrictions following the covid epidemic the festival was discontinued.

The village pub, which had been a haunt of John Peel, was reopened in 2016 after a long period of closure. It closed again in November 2025.

== Governance ==
Ireby is in the parliamentary constituency of Penrith and Solway. In the December 2019 general election, the Tory candidate for Workington, Mark Jenkinson, was elected the MP, overturning a 9.4 per cent Labour majority from the 2017 election to eject shadow environment secretary Sue Hayman by a margin of 4,136 votes. Until the December 2019 general election The Labour Party had won the seat in the constituency in every general election since 1979.The Conservative Party had only been elected once in Workington since World War II, at the 1976 by-election. In the 2024 United Kingdom general election, under new constituency boundaries Penrith and Solway went back to Labour.

Before Brexit, its residents were covered by the North West England European Parliamentary Constituency.

For Local Government purposes, it is in the Bothel and Wharrels electoral ward of Cumberland Council. Historically, it was in Allerdale district of Cumbria between 1974 and 2023, and the Wigton Rural District of Cumberland from 1894 to 1974.

The village forms part of the civil parish of Ireby and Uldale and has its own Parish Council along with Uldale, Ireby and Uldale Parish Council.

== In popular culture ==
A documentary series, Cumbrian Tales, was commissioned by the BBC in 1998, but taken off air after one episode due to "conflict of interest". The six-part series was eventually screened on ITV in 1999.

== See also ==
- Listed buildings in Ireby and Uldale
- Ireby Old Church
