= Listed buildings in Hornby-with-Farleton =

Hornby-with-Farleton is a civil parish in Lancaster, Lancashire, England. It contains 37 listed buildings that are recorded in the National Heritage List for England. Of these, two are listed at Grade I, the highest of the three grades, one is at Grade II*, the middle grade, and the others are at Grade II, the lowest grade.

The parish contains the village of Hornby and the smaller settlement of Farleton, and is otherwise rural. Most of the listed buildings are in Main Street, Hornby, and a high proportion of these are houses. The major building in the parish is the country house of Hornby Castle; this and associated structures are listed. The River Wenning passes through the parish, and the bridge crossing it is listed. Other listed buildings include a cross and three cross bases, two churches and associated structures, a public house, a hotel, a village institute, a drinking fountain, a toll house, a former police station, and three milestones.

== Key ==
Grade	Criteria
I	Buildings of exceptional interest, sometimes considered to be internationally important
II*	Particularly important buildings of more than special interest
II	Buildings of national importance and special interest

== Buildings ==
Name and location	Photograph	Date	Notes	Grade
Cross base 54.11132°N 2.63602°W	—	8th or 9th century	The cross base is in the churchyard of St Margaret's Church. It is in sandstone, roughly square, and tapers to a height of about 2 metres (6 ft 7 in). At the top is a socket, and each side is decorated with an arch on shafts containing a carving.	II*
Cross; 54.10020°N 2.62763°W		Medieval (probable)	The cross base and head are on the east side of Moss Lane, and are in sandstone. The base is an irregular boulder with a socket containing a short shaft to which the cross head is fixed with cement mortar.	II
Cross base 54.09972°N 2.65356°W	—	Medieval	The cross base is on the south side of the A683 road. It is in sandstone and consists of an irregular boulder with a rectangular socket for a shaft, which is missing.	II
Cross base 54.10522°N 2.63270°W		Medieval	The cross base is southeast of the crossroads of Hornby Road (B6480) and Moss Lane. It is in sandstone and consists of a large irregular boulder with a rectangular socket for a shaft, which is missing.	II
St Margaret's Church; 54.11143°N 2.63629°W		1514	The oldest part of the church is the tower, the nave was rebuilt in 1817, and the arcades and clerestory were added in 1889 by Paley, Austin and Paley. It is in sandstone and consists of a nave and apsidal chancel with a clerestory, aisles, and a west tower. The tower is octagonal, in three stages with a west doorway, gargoyles, and an embattled parapet with pinnacles.	I
Hornby Castle; 54.11130°N 2.63243°W		16th century	The oldest part of the country house is the polygonal tower. The house was repaired, altered and enlarged during the 19th century by Sharpe and Paley and their successors in their Lancaster practice. It is in sandstone with slate roofs, and is in Perpendicular style. The house has an irregular plan around a courtyard, and the windows are either mullioned or mullioned and transomed. Other features include a square tower, another, smaller, polygonal tower, embattled parapets, bay windows, an oriel window, and a partly blocked Venetian window.	I
House to north of Castle Hotel; 54.11101°N 2.63667°W	—	1687	The stone house has a slate roof, three storeys and three bays. Most of the windows are sashes with plain surrounds. The central doorway is moulded and has an inscribed battlemented lintel.	II
Yew Tree Cottage; 54.10904°N 2.63600°W	—	1700	The house is in stone with a slate rood, and has two storeys and three bays. Most of the windows are sashes. The central doorway has an inscribed battlemented lintel. Inside is a bressumer and other original features.	II
Farleton Farmhouse; 54.09832°N 2.65452°W	—	1731	A stone house with a stone-slate roof in two storeys and three bays. There is a central gabled porch above which is a group of windows in Venetian style, the lower part of the central window being replaced by a datestone. The mullions have been removed from the other windows.	II
Hornby Hall Cottage; 54.11191°N 2.63760°W	—	Mid 1730s	The house was formerly part of Hornby Hall, the rest of which has been demolished. It is in sandstone with a hipped slate roof, in two storeys. The west wall is rendered; this and the south wall have chamfered quoins. Most of the windows are sashes, and there is a stair window.	II
26, 28 and 30 Main Street; 54.10912°N 2.63560°W	—	Early to mid 18th century	A house and former bank in sandstone with a slate roof. They are in two storeys, the house has two bays and the former bank has three. The windows are mullioned. The door to the house has a moulded surround, and a lintel decorated with a rosette. Above both doors is a slate hood on brackets.	II
11 and 13 Main Street; 54.10873°N 2.63602°W	—	Mid 18th century	A house and shop in sandstone with a stone-slate roof. They are in two storeys and have a front of three bays. The windows are mullioned, and in the right bay is a modern shop front. The central bay contains two doorways with plain surrounds.	II
19 and 21 Main Street; 54.10893°N 2.63601°W	—	Mid 18th century	A pair of sandstone houses with a slate roof in two storeys. No 19 has two bays, mullioned windows, and a doorway with an arched lintel containing a fluted false keystone, and a cornice. No 21 has one bay and a doorway with a plain surround and a pitched slate hood.	II
41 and 43 Main Street; 54.11050°N 2.63640°W	—	18th century (probable)	A pair of houses opposite the entrance to Hornby Castle that were refronted with an embattled parapet in the 19th century. They are stuccoed with a stone-slate roof, in two storeys, and each house has a two-bay front. Some of the windows are mullioned. The doorway of No 43 has an inscribed keystone.	II
45 and 47 Main Street; 54.11065°N 2.63650°W	—	Mid 18th century	Originally one house, later divided into two flats, it is in sandstone with a stone-slate roof. There are two storeys and the original part of the house has three bays. The windows are mullioned, and the door has a plain surround. There is an additional bay on the left side.	II
58 and 60 Main Street; 54.11104°N 2.63628°W	—	Mid 18th century	A pair of sandstone houses with a stone-slate roof, No 60 being of a later date. Both houses have two storeys and two bays. No. 58 Has mullioned windows, a blocked doorway between the bays, and an entrance on the right side. No 60 has sash windows and a doorway with a moulded surround.	II
Camp House Farmhouse; 54.10408°N 2.65167°W	—	Mid 18th century	A stone house with a tiled roof, in two storeys and three bays. The windows are mullioned, and the central doorway has an architrave. At the rear is a tall stair window.	II
11 Station Road and garage 54.10775°N 2.63566°W	—	1754	A sandstone house with a garage attached to the right, it has a modern tiled roof, and is in two storeys. The house has two bays and contains sash windows. The doorway has a plain surround, and above it is an inscribed plaque. The garage has one bay, and a wide entrance with a basket arch with a sash window above.	II
Hornby Bridge; 54.10962°N 2.63592°W		1769	The bridge carries the A683 road over the River Wenning, and was widened on the west side during the Second World War. It is in sandstone, incorporating some earlier material, and consists of three segmental arches with triangular cutwaters. The bridge has a solid parapet with coping.	II
Castle Hotel; 54.11088°N 2.63650°W		Late 18th century	The hotel is in sandstone with a slate roof, and has three storeys and a front of three bays. The door and windows have pain surrounds, the windows being sashes. To the right is a recessed single-bay extension that has a first floor doorway reached by a flight of external stone steps.	II
St Mary's Presbytery; 54.11139°N 2.63700°W	—	1777	The presbytery, designed by Edward Batty, is in sandstone with a slate roof. It has two storeys with an attic, and three bays. The central doorway is flanked by Venetian windows with Gothick tracery, and in the upper floor there are three-light windows in the outer bays. On the corners of the building are quoins, and at the top is a cornice.	II
Royal Oak Hotel; 54.11259°N 2.63731°W		1781	The public house is in sandstone with a tiled roof. The main part has two storeys and two bays with a central moulded doorway. To the right is a lower two-storey extension with a wide central doorway flanked by modern mullioned windows. The other windows are sashes.	II
St Mary's Church; 54.11129°N 2.63713°W		1820	A Roman Catholic church in sandstone with a slate roof. The porch has a Venetian opening consisting of a door flanked by windows. On the sides of the entrance are corbels, one supporting a bust of Emperor Constantine, and the other of Oswald of Northumbria.	II
Toll House; 54.10060°N 2.64968°W		1823	The toll house was built on the Lancaster to Richmond Turnpike. It is in sandstone with a stone-slate roof. The house has a central two-bay part in two storeys, and flanking single-storey bays under a catslide roof. The ground floor windows have round heads, and the upper floor windows are rectangular. In the right hand bay is a doorway.	II
Lawnds; 54.12027°N 2.63722°W	—	Early 19th century	A country house in sandstone with a hipped slate roof. There are two storeys and a symmetrical three-bay front. The house is flanked by two-storey one-bay pavilions, linked to the house by walls containing windows. The house has a central single-storey porch with an embattled parapet and round corner turrets.	II
Park Cottage; 54.11444°N 2.63473°W	—	1842	Originally two houses, it is in sandstone with a hipped slate roof, and has two storeys and four bays. There are chamfered quoins, and cross-windows. The remaining door is in the first bay and has a gabled porch. On the left side is a single-storey lean-to.	II
56 Main Street; 54.11102°N 2.63599°W	—	1850	Originally a vicarage, the house is in sandstone with a stone-slate roof. It has two storeys and an attic, and three bays, the right bay being gabled. The windows are mullioned and most have Tudor arched heads. Above the central doorway is a plaque carved with foliage, a motto, and an inscription.	II
Lodge, gate piers, and walls 54.11055°N 2.63598°W		Mid 19th century	The buildings are at the entrance to the drive of Hornby Castle, and are in sandstone. The lodge has a slate roof and an embattled parapet, and is in two storeys. Facing the road is a canted projection with mullioned and transomed windows. At the rear is an embattled circular turret. There are two pairs of gate piers, the inner pair being larger, all with iron finials. Flanking these are concave walls, also embattled.	II
Milestone, Main Street; 54.11096°N 2.63632°W		Mid 19th century	The milestone is on the east side of Main Street. It is in sandstone and has a triangular plan with a sloping top. The top is inscribed "HORNBY", and the faces have the distances in miles to Lancaster, Kirkby Lonsdale and Ingleton.	II
Milestone, A683; 54.10045°N 2.65029°W	—	c. mid 19th century	The milestone is on the south side of the A683 road. It is in sandstone and has a triangular plan with a sloping top. The top is inscribed "HORNBY". The milestone is partly embedded, and the legible inscriptions on the faces are "TO LANCASTER" AND "TO HORNBY".	II
Milestone, A683; 54.12406°N 2.63096°W	—	c. mid 19th century	The milestone is on the east side of the A683 road. It is in sandstone and has a triangular plan with a sloping top. The top is inscribed "HORNBY", and the faces have the distances in miles to Hornby, Lancaster, Kirkby Lonsdale and Ingleton.	II
Wall with three gateways 54.11091°N 2.63551°W	—	Mid 19th century	This formed the original entrance to Hornby Castle. It is in sandstone with a coping. There is a central wide entrance with a Tudor arch that is flanked by smaller gateways. Above the central arch is a re-set stone carved with a date and an eagle's claw.	II
Terrace wall, Hornby Castle; 54.11113°N 2.63271°W	—	Mid to late 19th century	The sandstone wall is on the southwest and southeast sides of the terrace. There are steps at both ends of the southwest wall, each in three flights with octagonal piers. The southeast wall has one flight of steps, and at the north end is a semicircular outshut treated as a bastion.	II
Drinking fountain 54.10828°N 2.63599°W		Late 19th century	The drinking fountain is in sandstone. The spout, in the form of a lion's head, is in a recess with a pointed arch. The trough has a wall, segmental in shape, and around it is wall. In the wall is a plaque carved with a cat holding a rat.	II
Police Station; 54.10822°N 2.63694°W		Late 19th century	The former police station is in sandstone with a slate roof, in two storeys and three bays. In the first bay is a single-storey canted bay window. The third bay projects slightly and has a hipped roof. The windows are mullioned or mullioned and transomed. The doorway on the right side has a Tudor arched head and a pediment.	II
Hornby Village Institute; 54.10891°N 2.63556°W		1914–16	Designed by Austin and Paley, the building is in local stone with a hipped slate roof, and is in Jacobean style. It was extended to the rear in 2005. The building has two storeys and a front of three bays. The central bay projects forward and contains a porch with a round-headed doorway approached by two steps, and flanked by pilasters. Above this is a four-light window, an inscribed plaque, and a semicircular pediment containing s crest. Each outer bay contains a four-light window with a shallow pediment.	II
War memorial 54.11148°N 2.63677°W		1920	The war memorial is in sandstone and contains medieval remains. It has an octagonal base on two square steps. The shaft is octagonal and tapering, with a square gabled head carved with figures. On the top is a cross. There are plaques commemorating both world wars.	II
