= Hornby Castle, Lancashire =

Country house in Lancashire, England

Hornby Castle
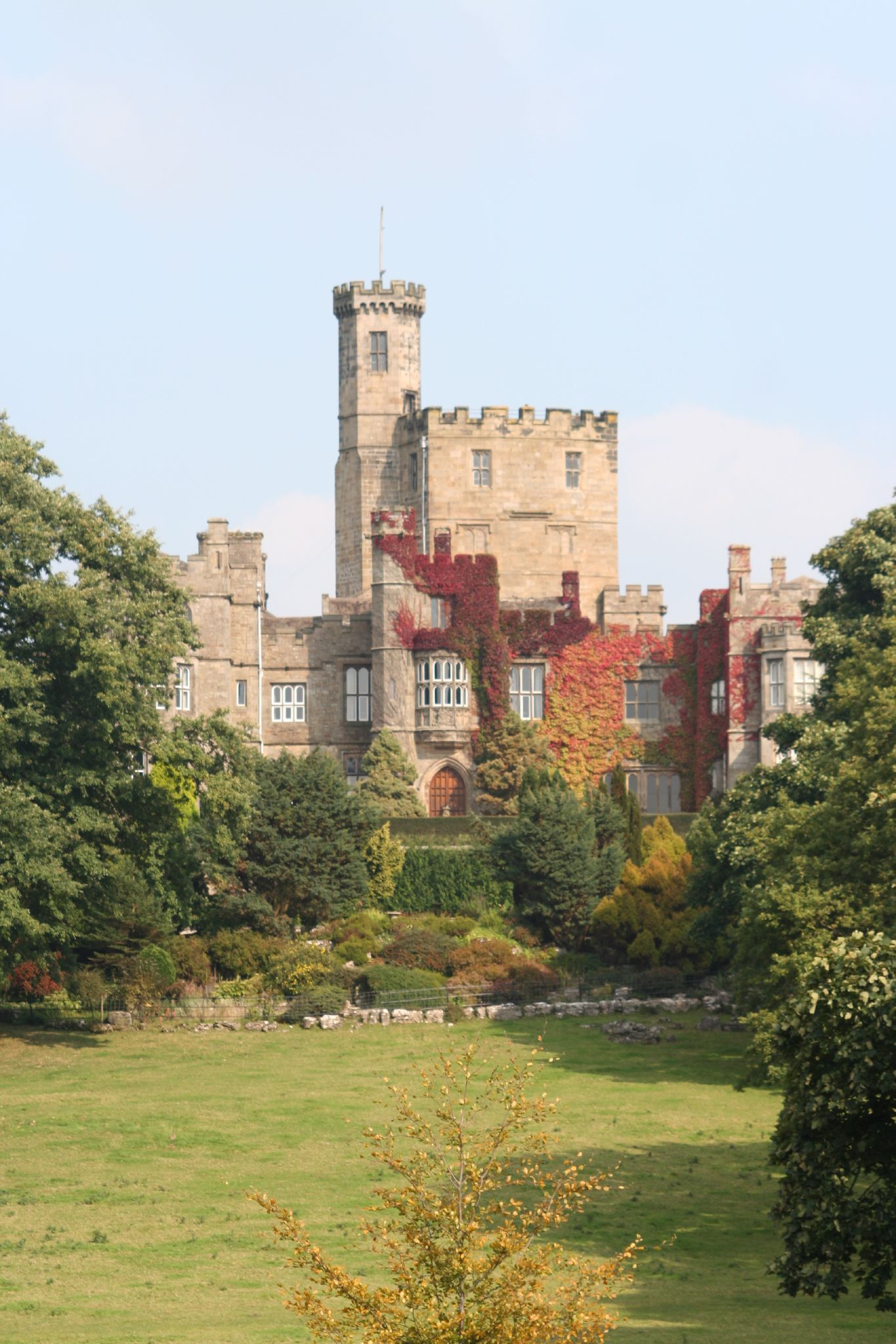
- Southwest front of Hornby Castle

- Location in the City of Lancaster district
- 54.1114°N 2.6323°W
- Location: Hornby, Lancashire, England
- OS grid reference: SD 588,686

History
- Founded: 13th century
- Rebuilt: About 1720

Site notes
- Architect: Sharpe and Paley
- Architectural styles: Gothic, Gothic Revival
- Restored: 1847–50
- Restored by: Pudsey Dawson

Listed Building – Grade I
- Official name: Hornby Castle
- Designated: 4 October 1967
- Reference no.: 1317655

Listed Building – Grade II
- Official name: Terrace wall on southeast and southwest sides of Hornby Castle
- Designated: 4 December 1985
- Reference no.: 1071687

Listed Building – Grade II
- Official name: No 54, pairs of gate piers and walls adjoining former entrance to Hornby Castle Drive
- Designated: 4 December 1985
- Reference no.: 1071654

Hornby Castle is a country house, developed from a medieval castle, standing to the east of the village of Hornby in the Lune Valley, Lancashire, England. It occupies a position overlooking the village in a curve of the River Wenning. The house is recorded in the National Heritage List for England as a designated Grade I listed building.

== History ==
It is thought that the castle was originally built for the Neville family in the 13th century; this is the most likely date of the base of the tower at the back of the castle. In 1285, Margaret de Neville was the owner and "had writ for livery" at Hornby Castle. The polygonal tower rising from this base dates from the 16th century, and was probably built for Sir Edward Stanley, 1st Baron Monteagle. His son, the second Baron Monteagle, took part in suppressing the Rising of the North in 1536. The third Baron Monteagle sold off a lot of the land and on his death in 1581 was succeeded by an only daughter, Elizabeth, who married Edward Parker, 12th Baron Morley. Their son William was made the fourth Baron Monteagle and became famous as the peer who was forewarned about the Gunpowder Plot in 1605. His son Henry was a zealous Royalist at the start of the Civil War and his estates were afterwards declared forfeit and sold. During the war itself, the castle was captured by Colonel Assheton in 1643 and occupied in 1648 by the Duke of Hamilton and his Scottish army. Although the castle was afterwards recovered by the family, Henry's son Thomas was forced by straitened financial circumstances to sell the castle to Robert Brudenell, 2nd Earl of Cardigan in 1663. Brudenell's grandson sold it in 1713 to the infamous Colonel Charteris. His daughter Janet married James Wemyss, 5th Earl of Wemyss and gave the castle to their second son Francis (who took the surname of Charteris) and remodelled the castle in about 1720. In 1789, Charteris sold Hornby to John Marsden, known as "Silly Marsden", of Wennington Hall, who was under the control of his aunt and her husband, the ambitious George Wright. Marsden sold Wennington to pay for Hornby. After a long legal battle over Marsden's will (he had died in 1826), Admiral Sandford Tatham regained control of the property in 1838 from George Wright's family. He died in 1840, leaving it to his nephew Pudsey Dawson the younger, High Sheriff of Lancashire for 1845.

Dawson commissioned the Lancaster architects Sharpe and Paley to rebuild much of the structure; this was carried out between 1847 and 1850. The architects retained the older parts, including the polygonal tower, but demolished or remodelled the section constructed for Charteris. This included rebuilding the front of the castle, adding wings and a portico, and replacing the round tower with a square one. The cost was at least £1,300 (equivalent to £140,000 in 2025). In 1859, the castle was inherited by Pudsey's nephew, Richard Pudsey Dawson, who sold it to John Foster, a Bradford mill owner. Under his ownership, the successors in the architectural practice, Paley and Austin, made additions in 1879–82 on the west side of the building, and further alterations were made in 1890 by W. and R. Mawson of Bradford. The castle then descended via his son William Foster (1821–1884) to William's son Colonel William Henry Foster, High Sheriff for 1891 and MP for Lancaster from 1895 to 1900.

In the middle of the 20th century, some of the rooms in the east parts of the house were removed to create a courtyard. At the same time, the main internal staircase was removed.

== Architecture ==
=== Exterior ===
The house is constructed in sandstone rubble and it has slate roofs. Its architectural style is Perpendicular. The plan is irregular. The building is mainly in two storeys, and much of it has a battlemented parapet. The entrance front faces southwest and is almost symmetrical, with seven bays. The lateral bays project forward, as does the central three-storey porch. All the windows are mullioned, or mullioned and transomed. The lateral bays have bay windows, the upper floors of which are canted. The left bay has an additional pair of windows above the bay window. On each side of the porch are two bays containing varying types of windows. The porch has an octagonal turret on the left and a diagonal buttress on the right. In the middle storey is an oriel window, above which is a three-light window. Behind the porch, and slightly off-set to the left, is a square tower, and to its left is the taller, narrower, polygonal tower. The windows in the square tower include a partly blocked Venetian window. The courtyard created in the 20th century is behind the three right bays.

=== Interior ===
The porch has a vaulted ceiling with foliated bosses. The hall is entered through a Tudor arch containing a Gothic-style glazed timber screen. The hall contains a sandstone fireplace with a Tudor arch. Its windows contain stained glass dating from the late 19th century and moved here in the 20th century. To the left of the hall is the Library containing woodwork said to be by Gillows. The upper floor includes a billiard room with Gothic decoration. Also on the upper floor is a drawing room with a barrel vault and pendents.

=== External features ===
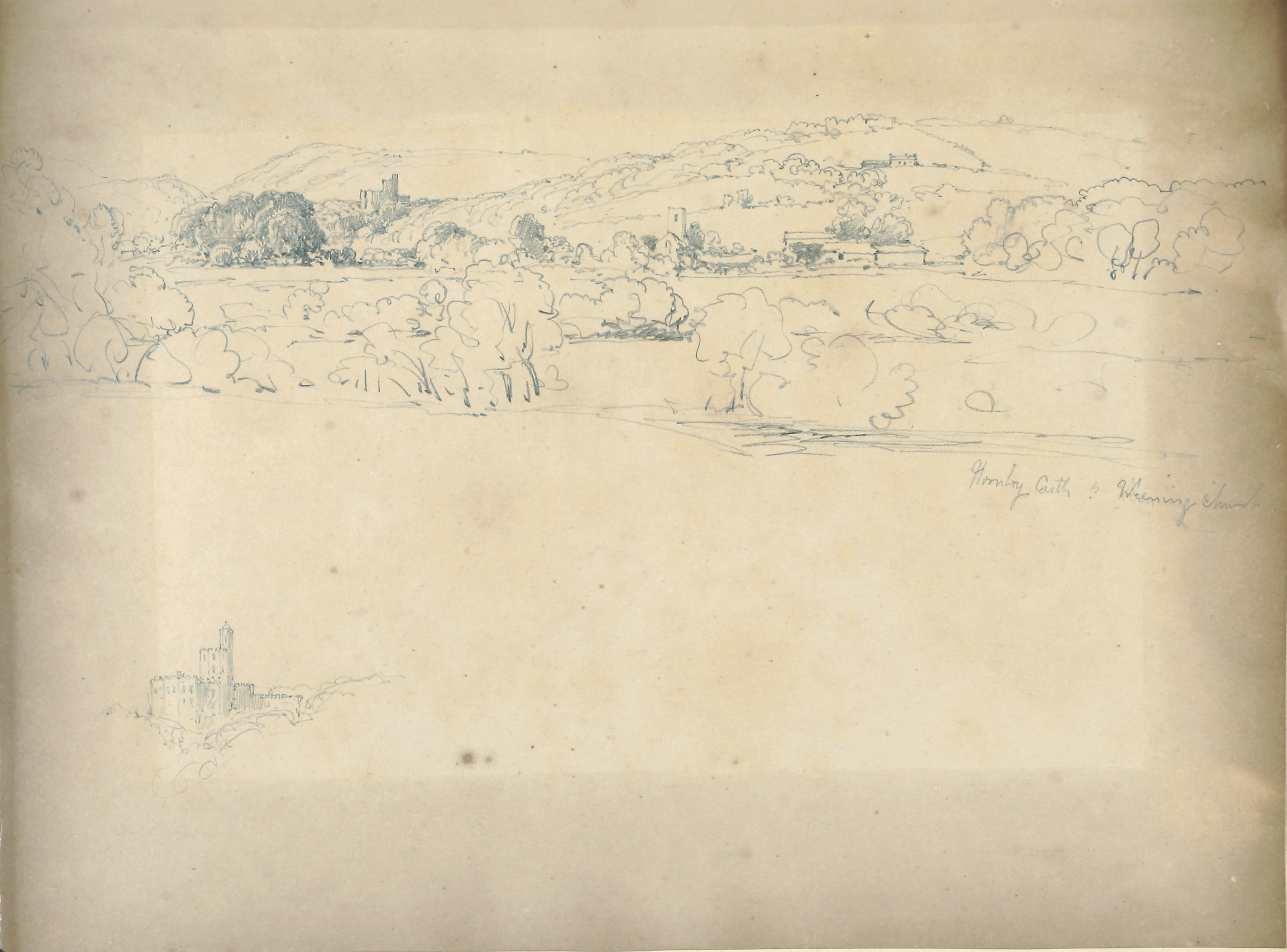
Sketches (1845 or 1846) of Hornby Castle, with St Margaret's Church, attributed to Henry Harris Lines

To the northeast of the main building is the earlier courtyard, now surrounded by apartments. It is entered by a gatehouse with a pointed arch. On the southwest and southeast sides of the house is a terrace with sandstone walls dating from the 19th century. Three flights of steps lead down from the terrace, and at the north end is a small semicircular building acting as a bastion. The walls are listed at Grade II. At the entrance to the drive formerly leading to the castle is a lodge and gate piers. The lodge has a canted front, a steep slated roof, and an embattled turret. The gate piers are carved with roundels containing green men and the crest of Pudsey Dawson. The lodge, gate piers and adjoining wall are also listed at Grade II.

== Present day ==
Hornby Castle is privately owned. The gardens are opened for special events on advertised dates.

== See also ==
- Grade I listed buildings in Lancashire
- Listed buildings in Hornby-with-Farleton
