= Listed buildings in Bentham, North Yorkshire =

Bentham is a civil parish in the county of North Yorkshire, England. It contains 54 listed buildings that are recorded in the National Heritage List for England. Of these, two are listed at Grade II*, the middle of the three grades, and the others are at Grade II, the lowest grade. The parish contains the settlements of High Bentham and Low Bentham, and the surrounding countryside. Most of the listed buildings are houses, cottages, shops, farmhouses and farm buildings. The others include churches, a plague stone, public houses, bridges, a Quaker meeting house, a masonic hall, railway boundary posts and a school.

== Key ==
Grade	Criteria
II*	Particularly important buildings of more than special interest
II	Buildings of national importance and special interest

== Buildings ==
Name and location	Photograph	Date	Notes	Grade
St John the Baptist Church; 54.11809°N 2.54498°W		15th century	The oldest part of the church is the tower, the rest being restored and largely rebuilt by R. Norman Shaw in 1876–78. The church is built in stone with a slate roof, and consists of a nave with a clerestory, north and south aisles, a north porch, a chancel with a north vestry and a south chapel, and a west tower. The tower is in Perpendicular style, with three stages, diagonal buttresses, and a west doorway above which is a three light window. The two-light bell openings have trefoil heads with mouchettes in the spandrels, and hood moulds, and at the top is an embattled parapet with four crocketed pinnacles.	II*
Ashfield Cottages, 6 and 7 Main Street; 54.11855°N 2.51425°W	—	1635	A pair of rendered cottages, with stone dressings and a stone slate roof. No. 6 has three bays, and No. 7 has one. The central doorway in No. 6 has a doorway with a chamfered surround, and a decorated, initialled and dated lintel. In the ground floor are mullioned windows, and the upper floor contains sashes. No. 7 has a doorway with a plain surround and three-light mullioned windows.	II
Ashfield Cottages, 4 and 5 Main Street; 54.11852°N 2.51409°W	—	17th century	A barn, later a pair of cottages, in stone, the right cottage rendered, with a tile roof. There are two storeys and two bays. The left doorway has a chamfered surround and a massive lintel, the right doorway has a moulded surround and a decorated lintel, and the windows are sashes.	II
Gill Farmhouse; 54.13533°N 2.56178°W	—	17th century	The farmhouse is rendered, with painted stone dressings, and a stone slate roof with shaped gable kneelers. There are two storeys and three bays. The central doorway has a moulded surround and a decorated lintel. The windows are sashes, and have a single light with a chamfered surround, or chamfered mullions.	II
Lane Foot Farmhouse and Cottage; 54.11110°N 2.47667°W	—	17th century	The farmhouse and cottage are in stone with stone slate roofs and two storeys. The windows either have fixed lights or are mullioned with sashes. One window has a moulded surround and a hood mould. The house has two bays, the cottage has one bay, and both have a doorway with a plain surround.	II
Parkinson Farmhouse; 54.11835°N 2.51360°W	—	17th century	The farmhouse is in stone with a stone slate roof, and its rear faces the street. There are two storeys and two bays. The south front has a projecting wing with a porch, and the windows are mullioned containing fixed lights or sashes, some with hood moulds.	II
Plague Stone; 54.11971°N 2.53209°W	—	17th century	This consists of a small basin recessed into a wall, about 15 centimetres (5.9 in) square. The top is curved with a lintel, forming an opening about 20 centimetres (7.9 in) square.	II
Scaleber Farmhouse; 54.13763°N 2.56205°W	—	17th century	The farmhouse is pebbledashed with rendered dressings and a slate roof. There are two storeys, two bays on the front, and four on the left return. The doorway has a moulded surround, a weathered decorated lintel and a hood mould. The windows have been altered; some are mullioned with casements, some mullions have been removed, and there are later sash windows.	II
Bentham Hall; 54.11841°N 2.51566°W	—	Mid to late 17th century	The house is in stone with a stone slate roof, and two storeys. On the right is a gabled bay containing an entrance with a plan surround and mullioned windows, above which is a small window in the gable with a chamfered surround, and three tiers of pigeon holes. To the left is a projecting bay with windows that are fixed or mullioned.	II
Moulterbeck Farmhouse; 54.11219°N 2.51511°W	—	Mid to late 17th century	A farmhouse and barn, later combined, in stone with a slate roof. There are two storeys and five bays, the middle bay projecting under a catslide roof, and a rear wing. The entrance is in the centre and the windows are a mix of fixed lights, sashes, and casements, some with mullions. To the left is a blocked segmental-headed wagon entrance.	II
Ridding Lane Farmhouse; 54.11381°N 2.48976°W		Mid to late 17th century	The farmhouse is in stone with a stone slate roof and two storeys. At the front are two bays, and a central doorway with a moulded surround, a fanlight, a decorated dated and initialled lintel, and a hood mould. At the rear are three bays, and a doorway with a moulded surround and a segmental head, above which is a stair window with a chamfered surround. Most of the windows are casements, some with mullions, some with missing mullions, and there is one sash window.	II
Jubilee Cottage; 54.11833°N 2.51383°W	—	1666	A rendered cottage with painted stone dressings and a stone slate roof. There are two storeys and one bay. The doorway has a chamfered surround and a decorated dated and initialled lintel. To its left is a three-light window with a chamfered surround and mullions, and the upper floor contains a casement window.	II
Former Brown Cow public house 54.11824°N 2.51016°W		Late 17th century	The public house is rendered, with stone dressings and a slate roof with kneelers. There are two storeys and three bays. The central doorway has a moulded surround and a decorated lintel. The windows are mullioned, with three lights and a continuous hood mould on the ground floor, and two lights in the upper floor.	II
Kirkbeck Farmhouse; 54.10914°N 2.53571°W		1676	The farmhouse is in stone with eaves modillions and a stone slate roof. There is an F-shaped plan, with two storeys, a main range of six bays, and two wings, one long and the other shorter. The windows either have a single light, or are mullioned, many with hood moulds. On the left is a doorway with a moulded surround and a basket-arched lintel with initials and the date. To the right is a later gabled porch with two storeys and an attic, a moulded surround, and a weathered lintel with a fleur-de-lis motif. Above this is a stepped mullioned three-light window, the lights with rounded heads, over which is a blocked two-light window in the attic.	II
Calf Cop Farmhouse; 54.12595°N 2.53757°W	—	1680	The farmhouse is in stone with a stone slate roof, two storeys and four bays. On the front is a porch, and a doorway with a moulded surround, a basket-arched head, and a decorated dated and initialled lintel. The windows either have fixed lights, or are casements, some with mullions, and others with mullions missing.	II
Gruskholme; 54.09754°N 2.48858°W		Late 17th to early 18th century	A farmhouse, later a private house, in limewashed stone, with two tiers of throughstones and a stone slate roof. There are two storeys and three bays. The windows are casements, most are mullioned, some mullions are missing, and some have hood moulds.	II
Mewith Head Hall, wall and gate piers 54.09740°N 2.46278°W		1708	A large house in stone, with quoins, a moulded cornice, and a stone slate roof with shaped gable kneelers. The front has six bays, the middle two bays projecting with three storeys, the outer wings with two. The central doorway has a Doric surround, pilasters, a round-headed fanlight with a moulded surround, a frieze with metopes, triglyphs and guttae, and an open segmental pediment. The windows are cross windows with moulded surrounds, mullions and transoms, some with hood moulds. Above the entrance is a slate sundial with an iron gnomon in a moulded architrave. At the rear are four bays, the middle two bays gabled. The garden walls are in stone, the entrances with moulded surrounds. The gate piers have rusticated shafts, and moulded caps, each with a cornice and a ball finial.	II*
Barn, Mewith Head Hall; 54.09736°N 2.46305°W		1708	The barn is in stone, and has a stone slate roof with a kneeler and ball finials. There are three bays, and it contains a segmental-arched wagon entrance, an oval initialled datestone, an entrance to the right with a chamfered surround, and two small casement windows.	II
Barn right of Punch Bowl Inn; 54.11852°N 2.54263°W	—	1708	The barn is in stone with a stone slate roof. In the centre is a segmental-headed wagon entrance, above which is a dated and initialled panel and a hood mould. To the right is an entrance with a chamfered surround.	II
Crow Trees Cottage; 54.12026°N 2.53822°W	—	Early 18th century	A pair of stone cottages with a tile roof, two storeys and four bays. The doorways have plain surrounds, one has a fanlight, and the windows are mullioned sashes and casements.	II
Low Bentham Bridge; 54.11915°N 2.53962°W	—	Early 18th century (probable)	The bridge carries the B6480 road over the River Wenning. It is in stone and consists of two segmental arches. The bridge has a round cutwater on both sides, a string course, and a coped parapet and wing walls with iron railings. On the bridge is an iron boundary plate.	II
Punch Bowl Inn; 54.11872°N 2.54263°W	—	Early 18th century	The inn is in stone with quoins and a slate roof. There are two storeys and three bays. The entrance has a porch flanked by pillars, and the left bay contains 19th-century windows with plain surrounds, a sash window in the ground floor and a casement window|above. To the right of the doorway are 18th-century windows, the upper floor with three lights and mullions. In the right bay are 19th-century windows, and the later outshut to the right contains a re-set decorated, initialled and dated lintel.	II
Bigber Farmhouse; 54.11882°N 2.51511°W	—	1727	The farmhouse is in stone, and has a stone slate roof with gable coping and shaped kneelers on the left. There are two storeys and four bays. The doorway has a moulded surround, and a decorated lintel with initials and the date. Some windows are mullioned, one with a hood mould, and the others are later with plain surrounds.	II
3 Brentwood Cottages and Brentwood End Cottage; 54.11896°N 2.53839°W	—	1730	A pair of stone cottages at the end of a terrace, with shaped eaves modillions and a stone slate roof. There are two storeys and three bays, and the windows are mullioned. Brentwood End Cottage has a doorway with a moulded surround and a dated and initialled lintel, and the windows are casements. The other cottage has a doorway with a plain surround, and the windows are a mix of casements and sashes.	II
Gruskham; 54.09732°N 2.48704°W		Early to mid 18th century	A farmhouse, later a private house, in stone with throughstones and a stone slate roof. There are two storeys and two bays. The front has been altered. The windows at the rear are casements, those in the left bay with chamfered mullions, and the window in the ground floor with a hood mould.	II
Lane House; 54.10348°N 2.50211°W	—	Early to mid 18th century	A stone cottage with a tile roof, two storeys and two bays. In the centre is a gabled porch, and a doorway with a plain surround. The windows are mullioned casements with two or three lights, those in the ground floor with hood moulds. In the right return is a re-set datestone.	II
Former Kings Arms; 54.11794°N 2.51028°W	—	1741	The former public house is on a corner site, it was refronted in 1897, and has been converted for other uses. It is in stone with quoins, a stone slate roof, three storeys, and a front of four bays. The right return is gabled, it has two bays, and contains a doorway with a pulvinated frieze and a pediment, and sash windows. Between the upper floor windows is a stone panel with a moulded surround, containing fluting, and an imitation wood panel inscribed with initials and the date.	II
Church Bridge; 54.11855°N 2.54330°W		Mid 18th century (probable)	The bridge carries the B6480 road over the River Wenning. It is in stone, and consists of two segmental arches, with voussoirs, a string course and a coped parapet. On the downstream side is an angular cutwater.	II
Clifford Hall Cottage; 54.13832°N 2.54222°W	—	18th century	The cottage is rendered, with painted stone dressings and a slate roof. There are two storeys and three bays. The doorway has a plain surround, and the windows are a mix of sashes and casements, some of which are mullioned, and one has a hood mould.	II
Greystonegill Bridge; 54.10904°N 2.47217°W		18th century (probable)	The bridge carries Greystonegill Lane over the River Wenning. It is in stone, and consists of two segmental arches, with three pilasters, a string course, an angular cutwater, a stone parapet and a wing wall.	II
Horse and Farrier Inn; 54.11842°N 2.51478°W		18th century	The inn is rendered, with painted stone dressings and a slate roof. There are two storeys and five bays, the right two bays later and projecting. In the centre of the original part is a gabled porch, the ground floor windows are sashes, and in the upper floor they are casements.	II
Near Sunny Bank Farmhouse; 54.10577°N 2.49056°W	—	Mid 18th century (probable)	The farmhouse is in stone with a Welsh slate roof, two storeys and two bays. The central doorway has a plain surround, the windows are mullioned and contain casements.	II
Former Post Office; 54.11931°N 2.53812°W	—	Mid 18th century	A pair of cottages, previously a cottage and a post office, they are rendered, and have painted stone dressings and a Welsh slate roof. There are two storeys and two bays. The right cottage has a doorway with fluted Doric pilasters and a flat pediment, and the left cottage has a 20th-century shopfront. The windows are sashes, the window above the shopfront with a chamfered surround.	II
Stonegate House, gate piers and wall, and The Lodge; 54.11948°N 2.53730°W	—	Mid 18th century (probable)	A house and former stables, they are rendered, with painted stone dressings and a slate roof. There are two storeys, and each part has three bays. The house has chamfered quoins and a central doorway with a moulded surround. This is flanked by tall bay windows, the roofs extending over the doorway to form a hood. In the upper floor are a single-light windows flanked by three-light mullioned windows, all with casements. The former stables contain a doorway with a Gibbs surround and an initialled lintel, over which is a painted datestone. In the centre is a wagon entrance with a segmental hood and a keystone, and to the right is a doorway and a window with vermiculated surrounds, round heads and keystones. There are also two pitching holes and a mullioned window. In front is a curving coped wall, and millstone grit gate piers on square bases, with octagonal shafts, a band and a fluted cap.	II
Crow Trees Farmhouse; 54.09944°N 2.48088°W		1770	The farmhouse is in stone with a tile roof. There are two storeys, three bays, and a rear outshut. The central doorway has chamfered jambs on square bases, and the windows are sashes, with mullions removed apart from the window to the right of the doorway. The lower floor windows have hood moulds, and above the doorway is a dated initialled panel with a floral motif. At the rear is a transomed stair window, and in the outshut is a re-set decorated basket-arched lintel with a fluted imitation keystone.	II
Barn left of Calf Cop Farmhouse; 54.12603°N 2.53756°W	—	1785	The barn is in stone with a stone slate roof. In the centre is a tall waggon entrance with a segmental head, a dated keystone, and a gabled slate hood on one wood and two stone brackets.	II
Bank View; 54.12023°N 2.53644°W	—	1786	A stone cottage with shaped eaves modillions and a stone slate roof. There are two storeys and two bays. The central doorway has a chamfered surround, and a moulded hood on fluted consoles. The windows are casements in projecting plain surrounds, and between the upper floor windows is a dated and initialled panel.	II
Quaker Meeting House and walls 54.12658°N 2.53757°W	—	1798	The meeting house is in stone with timber gutters on stone corbels and a stone slate roof. There is a single storey, a rectangular plan, and four bays. On the front is a gabled porch on a plinth, with an impost band and a pediment, and the windows are sashes. The meeting house stands in a burial ground that is enclosed by stone walls with half-round copings, and its main entrance has gate piers of stone quoins.	II
1–3 Mount Pleasant; 54.11794°N 2.50802°W	—	Late 18th to early 19th century	A row of three stuccoed cottages with stone dressings, quoins on the right, eaves modillions, and a slate roof with a kneeler on the right. Each house has a doorway with a plain surround, the left house has casement windows, and in the other houses the windows are sashes.	II
4 Mount Pleasant; 54.11793°N 2.50763°W	—	Late 18th to early 19th century	The house is stuccoed and has stone dressings, quoins, eaves modillions, and a stone slate roof with kneelers. There are two storeys and three bays. The doorway and windows, most of which are sashes, have plain surrounds, and in the left bay is a later square bay window.	II
9–10 Mount Pleasant; 54.11789°N 2.50740°W	—	Late 18th to early 19th century	A pair of stuccoed cottages, with quoins, shaped eaves modillions and a stone slate roof. There are two storeys and three bays. On the front are two doorways with plain surrounds, one with a moulded hood, and the windows are sashes with plain surrounds.	II
Gates south of Clifford Hall Cottages; 54.13612°N 2.54167°W	—	c. 1820	The gate piers are in rusticated stone with bands and ball finials. The gates are in cast iron, and have sun motifs with radiating spokes.	II
Ellergill Cottage; 54.11923°N 2.53636°W	—	1820	Three, later two, cottages in stone, with painted stone dressings, and wooden eaves modillions. One cottage has a stone slate roof, and the other a Welsh slate roof. There are two storeys and three bays. The doorways have plain surrounds, the windows are sashes, and in the upper floor is a painted oval plaque with an inscription and the date.	II
Ellergill House; 54.12089°N 2.53447°W	—	Early 19th century	Wings were added to the house later in the 19th century. It is in stone with shaped eaves modillions and a slate roof. There are two storeys, five bays, and recessed flanking wings. The central doorway has a rectangular fanlight, and most of the windows are sashes.	II
Lane House Farmhouse; 54.11645°N 2.49734°W	—	Early 19th century	The farmhouse is rendered, with painted stone dressings and a stone slate roof. There are two storeys and two bays. The central doorway has a plain surround, and the windows are sashes.	II
Masonic Hall; 54.11714°N 2.50952°W	—	Early 19th century	The building is stuccoed, with a sill band, a moulded eaves cornice, and a hipped slate roof. There are two storeys and five bays. In the centre is a Tuscan porch with two engaged and two free-standing columns, and an entablature. Most of the windows are sashes, there are two casement windows, and some windows are blocked.	II
Former Wards Grocers and Pigtails; 54.11813°N 2.51150°W	—	Early 19th century	A house, later two shops, in stone with a tile roof. There are three storeys and three bays. In the centre is a doorway with a plain surround and a rectangular fanlight, flanked by late 19th-century shopfronts. The windows in the upper floors are mullioned, with some mullions missing.	II
Brook Cottage; 54.11911°N 2.53775°W	—	c. 1830	Flanking gabled wings were added to the house later in the century. It is in stone with shaped eaves modillions and a stone slate roof. There are two storeys and three bays. The central doorway has a moulded hood, and the windows are sashes.	II
Sundial Inn; 54.11944°N 2.53700°W		c. 1830	The public house is in painted stone with a slate roof. There are two storeys and three bays. The central doorway has a plain surround on chamfered blocks, and the windows are sashes. Above the doorway is a painted sundial with an iron gnomon. At the rear are the remains of 17th-century mullioned windows.	II
St Margaret's Church; 54.11466°N 2.50836°W		1836–37	The chancel and a chapel were added to the church in 1901–02 by Austin and Paley. The church is built in stone with a slate roof, and consists of a nave, a chancel with a north vestry and a chapel, and a west tower. The tower has three stages, and contains a west doorway with a four-centred arch, a chamfered surround, and a hood mould with carved heads. Above it is a stepped tripartite window, two-light bell openings with hood moulds, and an embattled parapet with octagonal corner turrets. The nave also has embattled parapets.	II
The Ridding; 54.12592°N 2.56003°W		1857	A large house designed by E. G. Paley in Scottish Baronial style. It is in stone on a moulded plinth, with sandstone dressings, and a slate roof with crowstepped gables. There are two storeys and an entrance front of three bays, the left bay incorporating a tower. The doorway has a moulded surround and a hood mould, and the windows are mullioned. The tower has two stages, a rope moulded parapet on shaped corbels, with arrow slits, and clasping turrets with conical roofs. The roof of the tower is steeply pitched and hipped, and has a decorative iron balustrade.	II
Bentham Youth Centre; 54.11843°N 2.51255°W	—	1864	Originally a Quaker Meeting House, later a youth centre, it is stuccoed, with angle pilasters, and a slate roof with a pedimented gable. There are three bays. The central doorway has pilasters and a pediment, and an entrance with a moulded surround. The outer bays contain tall windows with moulded surrounds, an entablature and fixed lights, and there is a panel above the doorway with a similar surround.	II
Boundary posts, Bentham railway station 54.11543°N 2.50979°W		c. 1871	The posts were made for the Midland Railway to form a boundary to the railway track. They are in wrought iron, and are made from railway lines with the ends hammered, and embossed with the initials "MR*.	II
Bentham Grammar School; 54.11762°N 2.54446°W	—	1884–85	Originally a rectory designed by R. Norman Shaw, and later part of a school, it is in stone with a stone slate roof and projecting eaves. There are two storeys, and an E-shaped plan, with a front of six bays, three gables on the front and four at the rear. The gables are coped, and some have shaped kneelers. The entrance has a chamfered surround, a moulded basket-arched head and a hood mould. The windows are mixed; there are some with single lights, others are mullioned and transomed and there are oriel windows, some bowed.	II
