= Mewith Head Hall =

Historic building in Bentham, North Yorkshire, England

Coordinates: 54.097°N 2.463°W

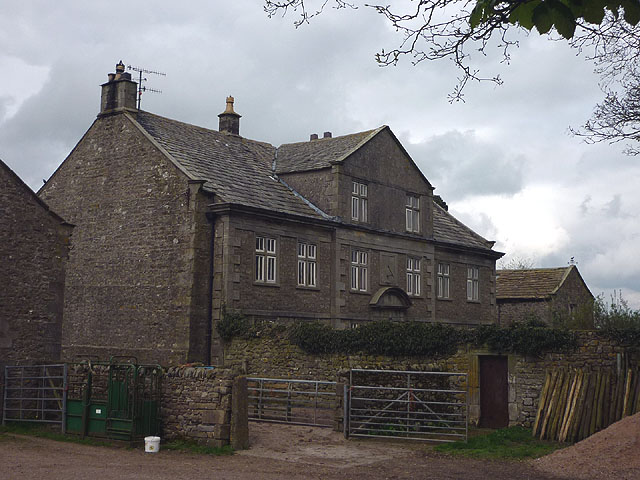
The house, in 2011

Mewith Head Hall is a historic building in Bentham, North Yorkshire, a town in England.

The house was built in the early 18th century for Ralph Baynes, father of John Baynes Garforth. The date "1708" is inscribed above the barn door, and it may well also be the date that the house was completed. The house was altered in the 19th century, and was grade II* listed in 1958.

The three-storey house is built of stone, with a stone slate roof. The central section is two bays wide, and the right and left wings are two bays wide and two storeys high. It has a central staircase plan, and a central doorway with a Doric surround, pilasters, a round-headed fanlight with a moulded surround, a frieze with metopes, triglyphs and guttae, and an open segmental pediment. The windows are cross windows with moulded surrounds, mullions and transoms, some with hood moulds. Above the entrance is a slate sundial with an iron gnomon in a moulded architrave. At the rear are four bays, the middle two bays gabled. The garden walls are in stone, the entrances with moulded surrounds. The gate piers have rusticated shafts, and moulded caps, each with a cornice and a ball finial.

Inside the house, the dining room and principal bedroom have 18th century panelling and fireplaces, and there are also early fireplaces in the kitchen and in a second bedroom. There is a king post roof.

== See also ==
- Grade II* listed buildings in North Yorkshire (district)
- Listed buildings in Bentham, North Yorkshire
