= Margaret de Neville =

English landowner

Margaret de Neville, also Margaret de Longvillers and domina Margareta de Nevill (c. 1252 – February 1318/1319) was an English landowner in Yorkshire and Lancashire during the thirteenth and fourteenth centuries. Her inheritance helped to consolidate the power and influence of the House of Neville.

== Biography ==
Margaret de Longvillers (also spelt Lungvilliers) was born in Farnley, Yorkshire, either in or prior to 1252. She was the daughter and heir of John de Lungvilliers and inherited land in Hornby as well as other property in Lancashire, the West Riding of Yorkshire and Lincolnshire, upon his death in 1255. This included estates at Hornby, Cononley, Farnhill, Gargrave, Cleckheaton, Farnley and Armley. Margaret married Geoffrey de Neville (son of Geoffrey de Neville and Joan of Monmouth) prior to 1267. It was their marriage that consolidated the wealth and position of the House of Neville.

Margaret and Geoffrey had six surviving children. After the death of her husband c.1285, Margaret worked vigorously to keep control of her estates. However this control was on the condition of being granted a licence by the crown should she remarry. In 1285 she "had writ for livery" at Hornby Castle. In 1288/9 she settled the manor of Hutton Magna on herself for life. In 1293 a licence was granted to her so it is likely she remarried. In 1294 she was obliged to provide military service in Gascony, and in 1300 against the Scots.

The Coucher Book of Bolton Abbey has some of her charitable giving recorded in it. When leaving her name there instead of describing herself as 'wife of ...' or 'daughter of ...' Margaret de Neville used her own names, both "domina Margareta de Longvl" and "domina Margareta de Nevill".

Margaret de Neville died in 1318 or 1319 and was possibly buried at Bolton Abbey. At her funeral 1440 gallons of ale were distributed to the poor. The prior of Bolton Priory was an executor of her will. After her death there was a dispute over who would inherit the manor of Farnley.

== Marriage and issue ==
Margaret and Geoffrey had:

- John I de Neville of Hornby married Pernel
- Geoffrey Neville
- Robert I de Neville of Hornby married Isabel, daughter of Robert de Byron
- Edmund de Neville married Isolda, daughter of Robert of Flamborough
- William
- Margaret married Robert de Northmilford

== Sources ==
- Smith, Kathryn Ann (2003). Art, Identity and Devotion in Fourteenth-century England: Three Women and their Books of Hours. University of Toronto Press.
