= The Ridding =

Victorian country house in Bentham, North Yorkshire

Coordinates: 54.1259°N 2.5601°W

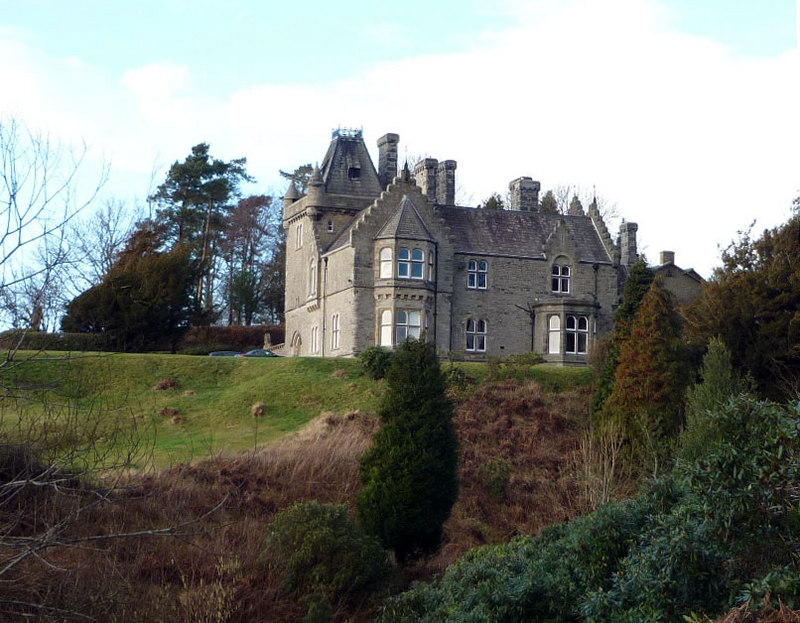
The Ridding

The Ridding is a Victorian country house located in the village of Bentham, North Yorkshire, England. It is recorded in the National Heritage List for England as a designated Grade II listed building.

It was built in Scottish Baronial style for B. H. Bent by E. G. Paley in 1857–60, the only building designed in this style by Paley. It is built of squared rubble with sandstone ashlar dressings and a slate roof. The frontage has three bays in two storeys and incorporates a short two-stage tower at the left.

== History ==
The house was built in 1857–60 for Baldwin Harry Bent. It was later owned by Joseph Teale, a medical doctor, whose only daughter Alice Catherine married Robert Garnett in 1880, who was a justice of the peace for Lancashire and the North Riding. Alice died in 1900 and Robert remarried. He died in 1921 leaving a son Richard Everard Garnett.

== See also ==
- Listed buildings in Bentham, North Yorkshire
- List of non-ecclesiastical works by E. G. Paley
