= Hornby Village Institute =

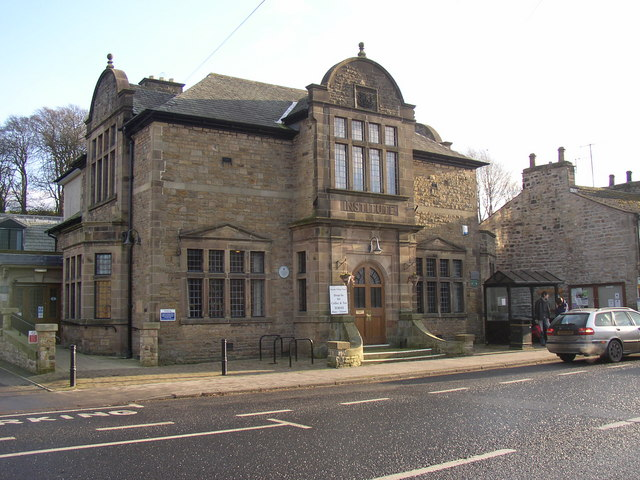

- Location in the City of Lancaster district
- 54.1089°N 2.6356°W
- Location: Main Street, Hornby, Lancashire, England
- OS grid reference: SD 586 683

History
- Built: 1914–16
- Built for: Colonel Foster

Site notes
- Architect: Austin and Paley
- Architectural style: Jacobean
- Governing body: Hornby Village Trust

Listed Building – Grade II
- Designated: 3 October 2003
- Reference no.: 1390686

Hornby Village Institute is a public building in Main Street, Hornby, Lancashire, England. It is considered to be important architecturally, and is recorded in the National Heritage List for England as a designated Grade II listed building.

== History ==
The building was designed by the Lancaster architects Austin and Paley, and was the last public building to be designed by the practice before the death of Hubert Austin in 1915. It was completed in 1916, and was paid for by the lord of the manor, Colonel Foster. By the 1950s more accommodation was needed, and an extension was added to the rear in 1956, helped by a donation from Sir Harold Parkinson of Hornby Castle. Another extension was added in 2005, designed by Harrison Pitt Architects.

== Architecture ==
The original part of the building is in Jacobean style. It is constructed in rubble stone with ashlar dressings and a slate roof. The central bay projects forward and contains a porch with a round-headed entrance flanked by pilasters. Above this are four windows, with the word "INSTITUTE" below. At the top of the bay is a semi-circular pediment containing a crested plaque. The lateral bays have four windows in the lower storey, and blind windows above.

== Present day ==
The building is known as the Hornby Institute Community Resource Centre, and has facilities for meetings, conferences, and performances. Parts of the building are licensed for civil weddings.

== See also ==
- Listed buildings in Hornby-with-Farleton
- List of non-ecclesiastical works by Austin and Paley (1895–1914)
