= List of non-ecclesiastical works by Austin and Paley (1895–1914) =

Austin and Paley was the title of a practice of architects in Lancaster, Lancashire, England, in the late 19th and early 20th centuries. The practice had been founded in 1836 by Edmund Sharpe. The architects during the period covered by this list are Hubert Austin and Henry Paley. Henry Paley had joined the practice as a partner in 1886 when his father, E. G. Paley, was Austin's partner; the practice then became known as Paley, Austin and Paley. E. G. Paley died in 1895, and the practice continued under the title of Austin and Paley. Austin's son joined the practice as a partner in 1914.

This list covers the non-ecclesiastical works executed by the practice during the partnership of Hubert Austin and Henry Paley between 1895 and 1914. These works include additions made to houses, schools and hospitals, a new educational establishment, an orphanage, an office and shop, a hotel, and three crosses of varying types. Because of the location of the practice, their non-ecclesiastical work was in the areas that are now Cumbria, Lancashire, and Greater Manchester, with one example in North Yorkshire.

== Key ==
Grade	Criteria
II*	Particularly important buildings of more than special interest
II	Buildings of national importance and special interest
"—" denotes a work that is not graded.

Name	Location	Photograph	Date	Notes	Grade
St Peter's School	Balmoral Road, Lancaster, Lancashire; 54.0466°N 2.7930°W		1895–97	New Roman Catholic school to accommodate 350 boys.	II
Additional buildings, Ripley School	Lancaster, Lancashire; 54.0393°N 2.8018°W		1896	Additions included cloakrooms, classrooms, a gymnasium and a sanatorium.	II
North Lonsdale Hospital	Barrow-in-Furness, Cumbria		1896–1903	A laundry was added in 1896, a new medical wing in 1899 and a new operating room in 1903. Since mainly demolished and replaced by a new hospital.	II
Village cross	Bootle, Cumbria; 54.2823°N 3.3722°W		1897	A village cross on the site of a former market cross.	II
St George's vicarage	Heaviley, Stockport, Greater Manchester; 53.3897°N 2.1408°W		1897	New vicarage for St George's Church.	II
Girl's Blue Coat School	Middle Street, Lancaster, Lancashire		1897–98	Additions.	—
Rossall School	Rossall, Fleetwood, Lancashire; 53.8957°N 3.0448°W		1897–1902	In 1897 a new school room was added; in 1902 a narthex and porch to the chapel; at an unrecorded date a dining room was built (this was replaced in 1926–28 following a fire).	—
Royal Albert Hospital	Lancaster, Lancashire; 54.0336°N 2.8008°W		1898–1901	South wing (Ashton Wing) added.	—
Nazareth House	Ashton Road, Lancaster, Lancashire		1898–1902	New Roman Catholic orphanage for the Sisters of Nazareth of Hammersmith.	—
Manor house	Halton, Lancashire; 54.0774°N 2.7607°W		1899	Additions.	II*
Foxfield railway station	Foxfield, Cumbria; 54.2587°N 3.2160°W		1900	Additions made to the station.	—
Hampson House	Hampson Green, Forton, Lancashire		c. 1900	House extended.	—
Greenclose	Kirkby Lonsdale, Cumbria		c. 1900	House and surgery.	—
Office and shop	New Street, Lancaster, Lancashire; 54.0500°N 2.8020°W		1901	Head office and shop for Lancaster and Skerton Equitable Industrial Cooperative Society.	II
Llandovery College	Llandovery, Carmarthenshire, Wales; 51.9952°N 3.8008°W		1901–03	Extensions, including an east range, school house and dining room. Alterations to the existing building of 1849–51.	II
Showrooms	North Road, Lancaster, Lancashire; 54.0502°N 2.7989°W		1902	Showroom and workshops in Baroque style. It was designed for William Atkinson, a cycle maker, who opened it as one of the earliest purpose-built car showrooms in the country. Later used as shops and a public house.	—
Alexandra Hotel	Penny Street, Lancaster, Lancashire; 54.0451°N 2.7992°W		1902	New hotel in Jacobean style.	II
Covell Cross	Church Street, Lancaster, Lancashire; 54.050108°N 2.803431°W		1902–03	Commemorative cross to celebrate the coronation of Edward VII.	II
Storey Institute	Meeting House Lane, Lancaster, Lancashire; 54.0487°N 2.8042°W		1903	Additions made.	II
Leeds Grammar School	Leeds, West Yorkshire; 53.8082°N 1.5616°W		1904–05	Extensions to the west of the school.	II
Sedbergh School	Sedbergh, Cumbria; 54.3207°N 2.5286°W		1904–06	Added the Powell Hall and six classrooms at a cost of £11,920.	—
Market cross	Market Square, Kirkby Lonsdale, Cumbria; 54.201823°N 2.596689°W		1905	Alterations made to the market cross.	II
School	Bolton-by-Bowland, Lancashire		1906	Additions made to the school.	II
Lancaster Royal Grammar School	East Road, Lancaster, Lancashire; 54.0471°N 2.7901°W		1906	Additions, including a laboratory.	II
Schools	Heaviley, Stockport, Greater Manchester; 53.3895°N 2.1403°W		1907	Two schools associated with St George's Church.	II
St. Bees School	St Bees, Cumbria; 54.4944°N 3.5925°W		1907–10	A chapel, headmaster's house, library and laboratories were added.	—
Vicarage	Woodplumpton, Lancashire; 53.804°N 2.761°W		1908	Vicarage enlarged.	—
Newland Hall	Galgate, Lancashire; 53.9804°N 2.7591°W		1908–13	A kitchen was added in 1908, followed by an entrance hall and a billiards room in 1913.	—
Church House	96 Church Street, Lancaster, Lancashire; 54.0504°N 2.8040°W		1910	House converted into the church hall for Lancaster Priory.	II
Michael's Fold	Grasmere, Cumbria; 54.4661°N 3.0169°W		1911	Extension to the house for the Misses Paley.	—
Shrewsbury School	Shrewsbury, Shropshire; 52.7049°N 2.7644°W		1913–14	Extension to the swimming baths. New baths were opened in 2007.	—
Hornby Village Institute	Hornby, Lancashire; 54.1089°N 2.6356°W		1914–16	Built in Jacobean style, later extended.	II
Myerscough Hall	Myerscough, Lancashire; 53.8646°N 2.7799°W		Undated	Alterations to the hall.	—

== See also ==
- Lists of works by Sharpe, Paley and Austin
