= Bentham Quaker Meeting House =

Chapel in Bentham, North Yorkshire, England

Coordinates: 54.126555°N 2.53759°W

Bentham Quaker Meeting House is a historic building in Low Bentham, a village in North Yorkshire in England.

The first Quaker meetings in Low Bentham were held in a barn in 1686, then moved to a purpose-built meeting house in 1720. This closed in 1750, but in 1768 a new building at Calf Cop was acquired. This proved to be too small, and it was demolished and replaced with the current building in 1798. In 1886, the Low Bentham meeting was merged with the High Bentham meeting, although the Calf Cop building was retained for occasional worship. In 1975, the High Bentham meeting house was sold. The area's regular meetings returned to the Calf Cop building, which was restored to the designs of Michael Sykes, using the proceeds of the sale of the High Bentham Building.

The building is constructed of stone, with a stone slate roof with timber gutters, and a stone chimneystack. It has a rectangular plan, with a porch on the east side, with access to a cross-passage. South of the passage is the main meeting room, and north is the former women's meeting room, since divided into smaller rooms. The passage also has a staircase, providing access to the gallery of the main meeting room. The porch has a datestone reading "1718", which is believed to have come from the predecessor building. The north and south walls are gabled and blank, while the east and west walls have sash windows: smaller original windows, and larger ones probably dating from the 19th century. Inside, there is an elders' stand with original panelling, and other early features include the staircase, and the balustrade of the balcony. In the meeting room are two 18th-century oak chairs, along with benches, and a heavily altered 18th-century table.

The meeting house has been grade II listed since 1958.

== See also ==
- Listed buildings in Bentham, North Yorkshire
