= St Margaret's Church, High Bentham =

Anglican parish church

Coordinates: 54.1146°N 2.5082°W

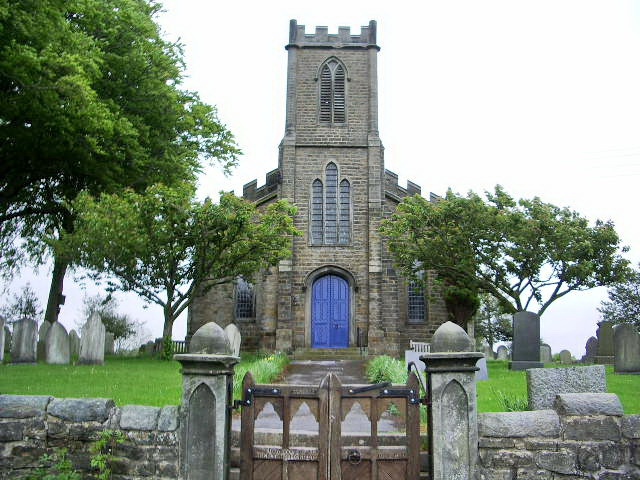
- West end of St Margaret's Church, High Bentham

- Location in North Yorkshire
- OS grid reference: SD 669,689
- Location: Station Road, High Bentham, North Yorkshire
- Country: England
- Denomination: Anglican
- Website: Bentham Churches

History
- Dedication: Saint Margaret

Architecture
- Heritage designation: Grade II
- Designated: 24 June 1988
- Architect(s): Austin and Paley (additions)
- Architectural type: Church
- Style: Gothic Revival
- Groundbreaking: 1837
- Completed: 1902

Specifications
- Materials: Stone, slate roof

Administration
- Province: York
- Diocese: Leeds
- Archdeaconry: Craven
- Deanery: Ewecross
- Parish: St Margaret, Bentham

St Margaret's Church is in Station Road, High Bentham, North Yorkshire, England. It is an Anglican parish church in the deanery of Ewecross, the archdeaconry of Craven, and the Diocese of Leeds. Its benefice is united with that of St John the Baptist, Low Bentham. The church is recorded in the National Heritage List for England as a designated Grade II listed building.

== History ==
St Margaret's was built in 1837. It was extended in 1901–02 by the Lancaster architects Austin and Paley. The additions included a new chancel, transepts, organ chamber and vestries. The plaster ceiling was removed from the nave, which was reseated, and a tower screen and pulpit were installed. These alterations cost £2,014 (equivalent to £210,000 in 2025). The church was closed in 2012 and subsequently converted into two private homes. The congregation either meets at St Boniface's Roman Catholic Church, or at St John's Church in Low Bentham.

== Architecture ==
The church is constructed in stone, with a slate roof. Its plan consists of a four-bay nave, a two-bay chancel with a north vestry and a south chapel, and a west tower. The tower has octagonal angle turrets, and an embattled parapet. It is in three stages, with a west doorway in the bottom stage. The middle stage contains a stepped triple window, and in the top stage are two-light bell openings. Along the sides of the nave are four two-light lancet windows. The chapel has two-light windows on the north and south sides, and a three-light window on the east. The east end of the chancel has a four-light window containing trefoil plate tracery. The two-manual pipe organ was built in 1893, and rebuilt in 1937 by Henry Ainscough of Preston.

== See also ==
- Listed buildings in Bentham, North Yorkshire
- List of ecclesiastical works by Austin and Paley (1895–1914)
