= Listed buildings in Wennington, Lancashire =

Wennington is a civil parish in Lancaster, Lancashire, England. It contains nine listed buildings that are recorded in the National Heritage List for England. All of the listed buildings are designated at Grade II, the lowest of the three grades, which is applied to "buildings of national importance and special interest". The parish contains the village of Wennington, and is otherwise rural. The River Wenning passes through the parish, and the bridge crossing it is listed. The other listed buildings consist of houses, buildings on a model farm, a boundary stone, and an animal pound.

== Buildings ==
Name and location	Photograph	Date	Notes
Oak Cottage and Garden Cottage and former barn 54.12523°N 2.58704°W		Late 17th century	Two sandstone cottages with a stone-slate roof in two storeys. Both cottages have mullioned windows, and doorways with chamfered surrounds and inscribed battlemented lintels. To the right of Oak Cottage is a barn that has a wide entrance with a segmental arch now incorporated into the cottage.
Oak Cottage; 54.12477°N 2.58602°W	—	1720	A pebbledashed stone house with a slate roof, in two storeys and two bays. The windows are sashes, and the doorway has a moulded surround and an inscribed lintel.
Old Wennington; 54.13806°N 2.56425°W		Early 18th century (possible)	A house in sandstone with a slate roof, in two storeys and two bays. Most of the mullions have been lost from the windows, and the doorway has long-and-short jambs.
Boundary stone 54.12383°N 2.58838°W	—	Early 19th century	The stone marks the boundary with the parish of Tatham. It is in sandstone with a roughly rectangular plan. The stone has a flat top and an inscription on the front.
Wennington Bridge; 54.12429°N 2.58759°W		Early 19th century	The bridge carries the B6480 road over the River Wenning. It is in sandstone, and consists of three segmental arches. The central arch is the largest, and has rounded cutwaters. The bridge has a solid parapet with coping.
Cattle pens, Moss Farm; 54.13176°N 2.58254°W	—	1845	The integrated cattle pens and stable are on a former model farm. They are in local freestone with Ulverston slate. The buildings have a single storey in three ranges forming a U-shaped plan. There are various openings.
Former mill, Moss House; 54.13200°N 2.58256°W		1845	The building included a steam-powered saw mill, a corn mill, a smithy and ancillary rooms on a model farm. It is in local freestone with Ulverston slate. It has two storeys and a symmetrical front of eight bays, the central four bays being gabled. There are two wide wagon entrances with elliptical heads and keystones, and other doorways and windows. At the rear is an engine house.
Pound; 54.12447°N 2.58722°W	—	19th century	The pound is in sandstone and has a weathered coping. It has a quadrilateral plan, and there is a gateway on the north side.
Wennington Hall; 54.12907°N 2.59146°W		1855–56	A country house by E. G. Paley, later used as a school. It is in sandstone, with roofs mainly of stone-slate. The main range has three storeys and a moulded doorway with a pointed arch. To the right is a cross-wing with a two-storey canted bay window. Behind the main range is a tower with a corner turret and an embattled parapet. To the left of the main range is the former single-storey stable court, and to the left of this is a two-storey gatehouse with an embattled parapet and a corner turret.
