= Farleton =

Farleton may refer to:

- Farleton, Cumbria, England
- Farleton, Lancashire, England
