= Henry Marsden =

Henry Marsden may refer to:

- Henry Rowland Marsden (1823–1876), philanthropist and mayor of Leeds, England
- Henry Marsden (MP) (c. 1625–1688), English landowner and Member of Parliament
