= St John the Baptist's Church, Low Bentham =

Anglican church in Low Bentham, England

Coordinates: 54°07′05″N 2°32′42″W

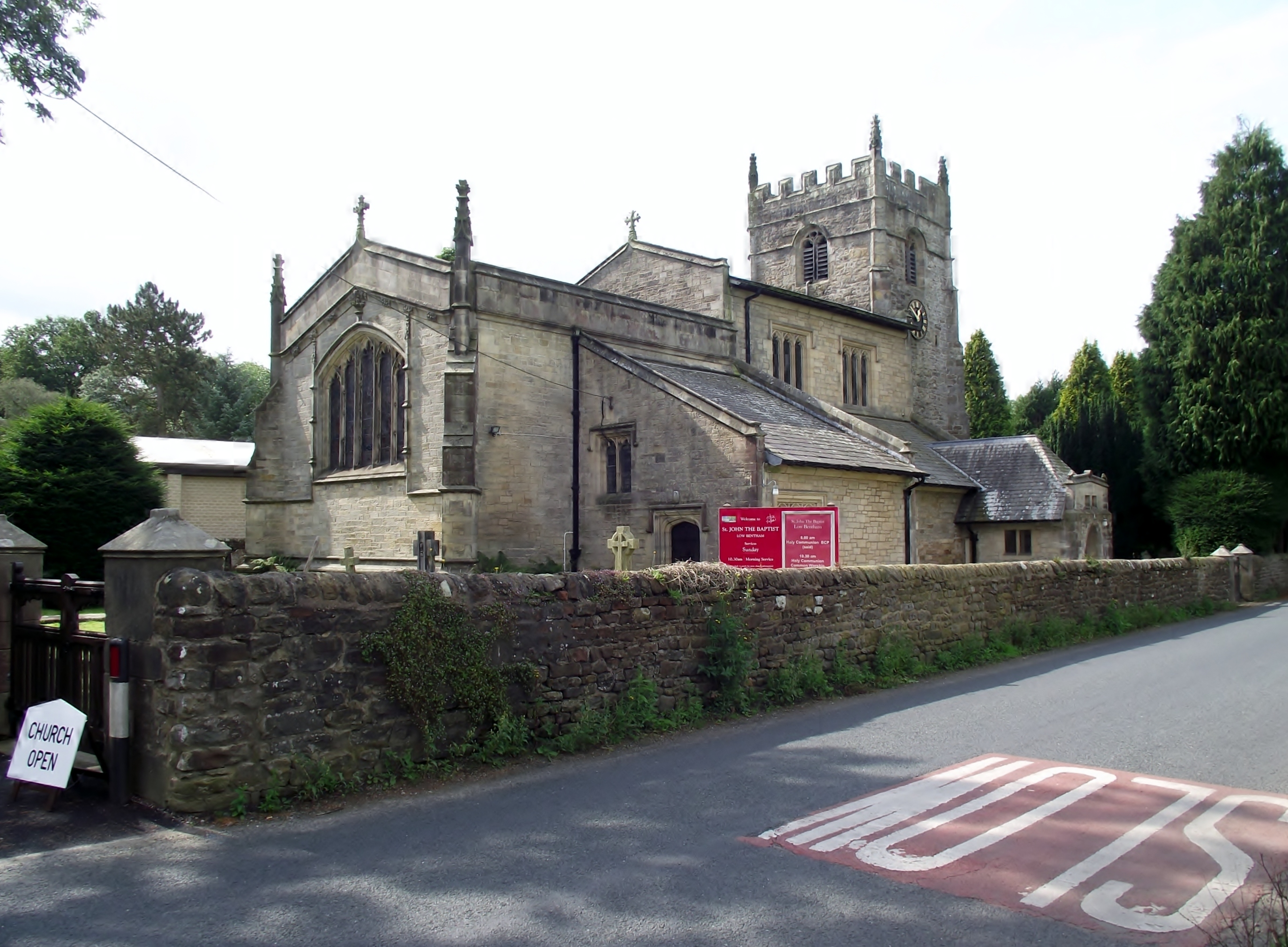
The church, in 2012

St John the Baptist's Church is the parish church of Low Bentham, a settlement in North Yorkshire, in England.

A church in Bentham was recorded in the Domesday Book. It is believed to have been destroyed during a Scottish raid in the early 14th century. The oldest parts of the current church, the tower and the chancel arch, date from the 1340 rebuild. The church was restored in 1822, and then largely rebuilt by Richard Norman Shaw between 1876 and 1878. A porch and new main door were added in 1891. The church was Grade II* listed in 1958. In 2023, a kitchen and toilets were installed, and the pews were replaced by chairs.

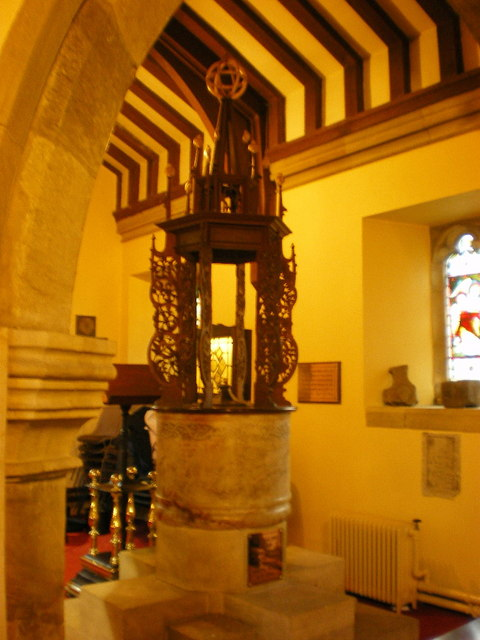
The font

The church is built of stone with a slate roof. It consists of a nave with a clerestory, north and south aisles, a north porch, a chancel with a north vestry and a south chapel, and a west tower. The tower is in Perpendicular style, with three stages, diagonal buttresses, and a west doorway above which is a three light window. The two-light bell openings have trefoil heads with mouchettes in the spandrels, and hood moulds, and at the top is an embattled parapet with four crocketed pinnacles. One 15th century window survives in the south wall of the chancel, and two in the south chapel. In the south chapel wall is a sundial dating from about 1800.

The font was designed by William Lethaby and dates from about 1890. The pulpit is by Shaw, and there is a king post roof dating from his restoration. The reredos was designed by Shaw and carved by Thomas Earp. The walls have majolica tiles manufactured by Maw & Co, and there are several windows with stained glass by Heaton, Butler and Bayne. A south aisle window incorporates a stone crucifix which probably dates from the 13th century.

The building contains a coffin slab dating from about 1340; the Kirkbeck Stone dating from the 17th century; and a 15th-century bell hanging in the porch. The church reputedly has the heaviest peal of six bells in Yorkshire, and together weigh 7,500 pounds (3,400 kg). The old organ, which is no longer playable, was built by William Hill of London as a "house organ" for Walker Joy, a prosperous oil merchant in Leeds; his brother designed a hydraulic engine to pump the bellows, making it the first ever to be blown by mechanical power. The organ is due to be removed. The churchyard contains a memorial to Robert Poole, a gravedigger, consisting of a sculptured shovel leaning against a tree trunk.

== See also ==
- Grade II* listed churches in North Yorkshire (district)
- Listed buildings in Bentham, North Yorkshire
