= Hutton Magna =

Village in County Durham, England

Coordinates: 54.50751°N 1.80547°W

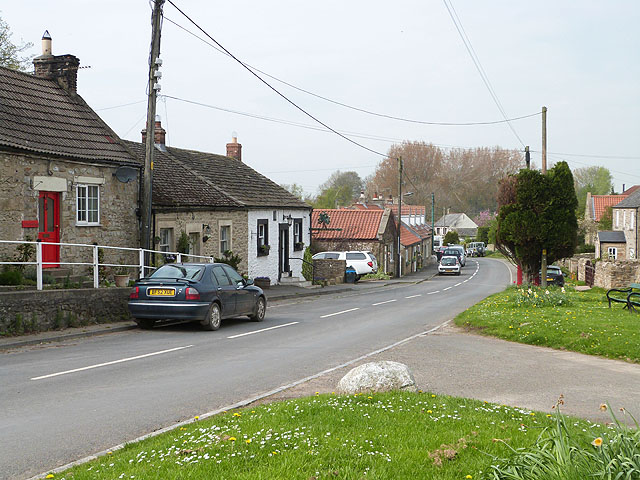

- Location within County Durham
- Population: 194 (2011)
- OS grid reference: NZ126124
- Unitary authority: County Durham
- Ceremonial county: County Durham
- Region: North East
- Country: England
- Sovereign state: United Kingdom
- Post town: Richmond
- Postcode district: DL11
- Police: Durham
- Fire: County Durham and Darlington
- Ambulance: North East
- UK Parliament: Bishop Auckland

Hutton Magna is a village and civil parish in County Durham, England. Situated 7.6 miles (12.2 km) southeast of Barnard Castle. Lying within the historic boundaries of the North Riding of Yorkshire, the village along with the rest of the former Startforth Rural District has been administered by County Durham since 1 April 1974, under the provisions of the Local Government Act 1972. The civil parish also includes the hamlet of Lane Head.

== History ==
The name "Hutton Magna" translates to "large farm on a hill" with the word magna being the Latin word for "large", possibly to distinguish it from the hamlet of Little Hutton to the east.

Known simply as Hutton, the village was recorded in the Domesday Book, with a population of 11 households.

In 1288/9 Margaret de Neville settled the manor of Hutton Magna on herself for life.

In 1870-72 John Marius Wilson's Imperial Gazetteer of England and Wales described Hutton Magna as:

"a village and a township in Teesdale district, and a parish partly also in Richmond district, N. R. Yorkshire. The village stands 1¾ mile S of the river Tees, 4 S by W of Winston r. station, and 6½ SE by E of Barnard-Castle. The township contains also the hamlet of Lane Head, and comprises 1, 510 acres."

== Governance ==
Hutton Magna was part of the local government district of Teesdale from 1974 before it was abolished as part of the 2009 structural changes to local government in England. For the purposes of Durham County Council elections, Hutton Magna is located in the Barnard Castle East ward.

The village lies within the Bishop Auckland parliamentary constituency.

== Community and culture ==
The parish church of St Mary, a grade II listed building, was rebuilt in 1878, incorporating some features dating back to the 12th century from a former medieval church.

The village's sole public house, The Oak Tree Inn, closed in 2018.
