= John Merrill (marathon walker) =

British marathon walker

John Merrill, from London, England, is a British marathon walker. He attended Westbourne School in Sheffield, Grosvenor House School in Harrogate, and Wennington School in Wetherby, Yorkshire, between 1955 and 1961. He is active in two areas: firstly undertaking extremely long walks, and secondly publishing books about walking, dealing with both his experiences and describing routes for readers to follow. In January 2003, he was made an Honorary Master of Derby University, for his walking and writing. He also lectures extensively about walking. By July 2020, he had walked more than 227,500 miles (366,100 kilometres) and worn out 149 pairs of boots, over 1,500 pairs of socks, and 49 rucksacks. He is a keen skier both downhill and cross country, a cyclist and qualified Qigong teacher.

On 17 July 2010, Merrill was ordained as an independent multi-faith minister.

== Marathon walks undertaken ==
Some of his main walks:

- Hebridean Journey – 1,003 miles (1,614 km).
- Northern Isles Journey – 913 miles (1,469 km).
- Irish Island Journey – 1,578 miles (2,540 km).
- Parkland Journey – 2,043 miles (3,288 km).
- Land's End to John o' Groats – 1,608 miles (2,588 km).
- First walk around entire British coastline – 7,000 miles (11,000 km)
- Across America – coast to coast 4,260 miles (6,860 km)
- Appalachian trail 2,500 miles (4,000 km)
- Pacific crest trail 2,800 miles (4,500 km)
- Continental divide 4,500 miles (7,200 km)
- Buckeye trail, first thru hike, 1,300 miles (2,100 km)
- Across Europe – Holland, Belgium, France, Switzerland – the Alps end to end to Nice – then round the Mediterranean to Spain and across the Pyrenees to Hendaye – 107 days, 3,000 miles with 600,000 feet of ascent.
- Le Puy to Santiago 1,100 miles (1,800 km)
- Seville to Santiago 750 miles (1,210 km)
- Laos, Algarve via Fatima to Santiago 650 miles (1,050 km)
- East of England Heritage Route – 450 miles (720 km)
- Entire coastline of Great Britain – 6,824 miles (10,982 km) – first ever undertaking.
- St. Olav's Way – Norway 420 miles, from Oslo to Trondheim.
- First crossing of the Jotunheimen mountains and glaciers over a month. Crossed 28 glaciers and climbed all the highest peaks.
- Hong Kong – 400 miles – walked all the trails on the islands.
- Himalayas – Alpine-style route to Everest Base Camp & Cho Oyu; Around Annapurna and to Annapurna base camp; the Lantang Valley; Kashmir & Ladakh.
- All the trails and mountains in New Mexico – 2,000 miles.
- Chesapeake and Ohio Canal 0– 230 miles.
- The Cathars Way – 200 miles
- The Bon Hommes Way – 220 miles
- Pilgrimage to St. Gillies du Gard – 180 miles.
- East of England Pilgrimage Walk – 420 miles.
- Winchester to Mont St. Michel – 180 miles.
- Paris to Mont St. Michel – 280 miles.
- Essex Coast Walk – 320 miles.
- Offa's Dyke Path, Wales – 177 miles. A walk undertaken in preparation for the round Britain walk.

=== Overall ===
In all, Merrill has calculated that he walked over 227,500 miles (366,100 km) between 1969 and July 2021, raising over £756,000 in charity sponsorship. His challenge walks have raised more than £1.3 million.

== Books published ==
Merrill is author of more than 500 walking guides which he prints and publishes himself, and his book sales are in excess of 4 million. His best-known work is possibly Turn Right at Land’s End, about his walk around Britain's coastline. He has created many long-distance walks including The Limey Way, The Peakland Way, and Jennifer's Challenge Walk and more than 50 day challenge walks, which have been used to raise more than £1.3 million for different charities. He has also written about non-walking matters such as Essex Witch Walks, Legends of Derbyshire, Sir Richard Arkwright, Sir Joseph Paxton and other famous Derbyshire figures.

== Walking practices ==
Merrill has a walking methodology which involves never taking breaks during a day's walk, carrying no water, travelling unaccompanied and walking thirty miles a day and more at a constant rate of three miles per hour. He has suggested that the limit of endurance is approximately 200 miles per week. He claims on his website that "you need to walk 500 miles (800 km) before you are settled into the task and have comfy feet. After 1,000 miles (1,600 km) you are really adjusted and by 1,500 miles (2,400 km) you can push yourself relentlessly. By 2,000 miles (3,200 km) of continuous walking you are at your peak performance, but after 2,500 miles (4,000 km) you are physically declining."

== See also ==
- Long-distance trail
- Walking
- Hiking
- Backpacking
