= Wennington, Lancashire =

Civil parish in Lancashire, England

Coordinates: 54.124°N 2.586°W

Wennington
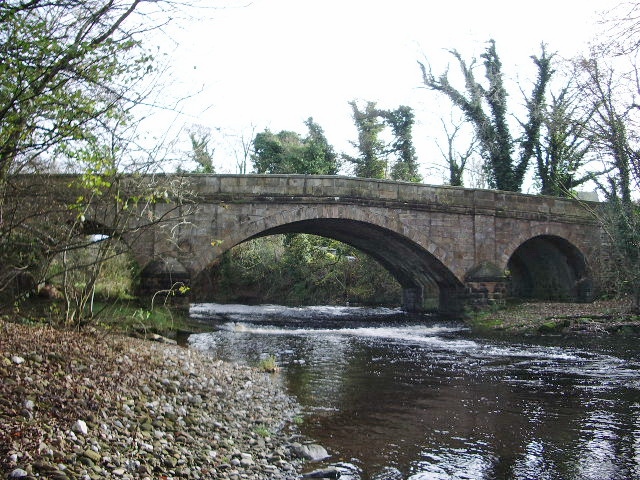
- Bridge at Wennington

- Shown within Lancaster district Location within Lancashire
- Area: 3.95 km^{2} (1.53 sq mi)
- Population: 178 (2011 Census)
  - Density: 45/km^{2} (120/sq mi)
- OS grid reference: SD616699
- Civil parish: Wennington
- District: Lancaster
- Shire county: Lancashire
- Region: North West
- Country: England
- Sovereign state: United Kingdom
- Post town: Lancaster
- Postcode district: LA2
- Dialling code: 01524
- Police: Lancashire
- Fire: Lancashire
- Ambulance: North West
- UK Parliament: Morecambe and Lunesdale

Wennington is a civil parish in the City of Lancaster district in Lancashire, England. The 2001 Census recorded the parish's population as 102, and the 2011 Census recorded it as 178.

The village is on the B6480, near the River Wenning and the Yorkshire border. It is administered by Wennington Parish Council. Wennington Hall is to the north.

== Transport ==
The village is served by Wennington railway station on what was the Midland Railway and is now the Leeds to Morecambe line. There are services to Leeds, Morecambe and Lancaster. It was also the location of the start of the Furness and Midland Joint Railway connecting to the Furness Railway to the west.

== See also ==
- Listed buildings in Wennington, Lancashire
