= Geoffrey de Neville (died 1285) =

Geoffrey de Neville (d.1285), lord of Hornby, was the son of Geoffrey FitzRobert de Neville (d.1242). He married Margaret de Longvillers and through this marriage inherited Hornby which became the family seat. Geoffrey used the Second Barons' War to increase his holdings by purchasing a rebel kinsmans' properties. He served in King Edward I's wars in Wales, was a member of parliament, and was appointed Justice of the Forest. When he died in 1285, he held lands in Lancashire and Yorkshire.

== Biography ==
Geoffrey was the second son of Geoffrey FitzRobert de Neville. As such, he was Robert Neville of Raby's executor and younger brother. His coat of arms, granted by King Henry III of England, argent a saltire gules, were the reverse of his brother Robert's. During the Second Barons' War, Geoffrey was a royalist supporter, like his brother, and his lands were largely unaffected. Following his marriage to Margaret de Longvillers, his political influence increased and his name appeared in numerous government records. The heirs of Hugh de Neville, a distant kinsman of the Essex line who had supported the rebels in the conflict, sold the estate of Appleby in Lincolnshire to Geoffrey, who also built a water mill. His branch of Nevilles were as closely associated with the House of Lancaster as the senior branch of Nevilles.

Geoffrey served in the wars against the Welsh and later was a member of Parliament. During the reign of King Edward I of England, he was appointed as Justice of the Forest in numerous English counties. This along with numerous other offices brought him influence and prestige.

Geoffrey owned in Lancashire (Hornby Manor, Melling, Wrayton, Braconsberh, Arkholme, Wennington, Wray, Farelton, and Cancefield) and in Yorkshire (the manors of Farnley, Gargrave, Hutton, Kirkby, Longvilliers, and Tunstall) at the time of his death in 1285.

== Marriage and issue ==
Geoffrey and Margaret had:

- John I de Neville of Hornby married Pernel
- Geoffrey Neville
- Robert I de Neville of Hornby married Isabel, daughter of Robert de Byron
- Edmund de Neville married Isolda, daughter of Robert of Flamborough
- William
- Margaret married Robert de Northmilford

== Sources ==
- Fox, Paul A. (2020). Great Cloister: A Lost Canterbury Tale: A History of the Canterbury Cloister. Archeopress.
- Smith, Kathryn Ann (2003). Art, Identity and Devotion in Fourteenth-century England: Three Women and their Books of Hours. University of Toronto Press.
- Young, Charles R. (1996). The Making of the Neville Family in England, 1166-1400. The Boydell Press.
