= Bentham Town Hall =

Municipal building in Bentham, North Yorkshire, England

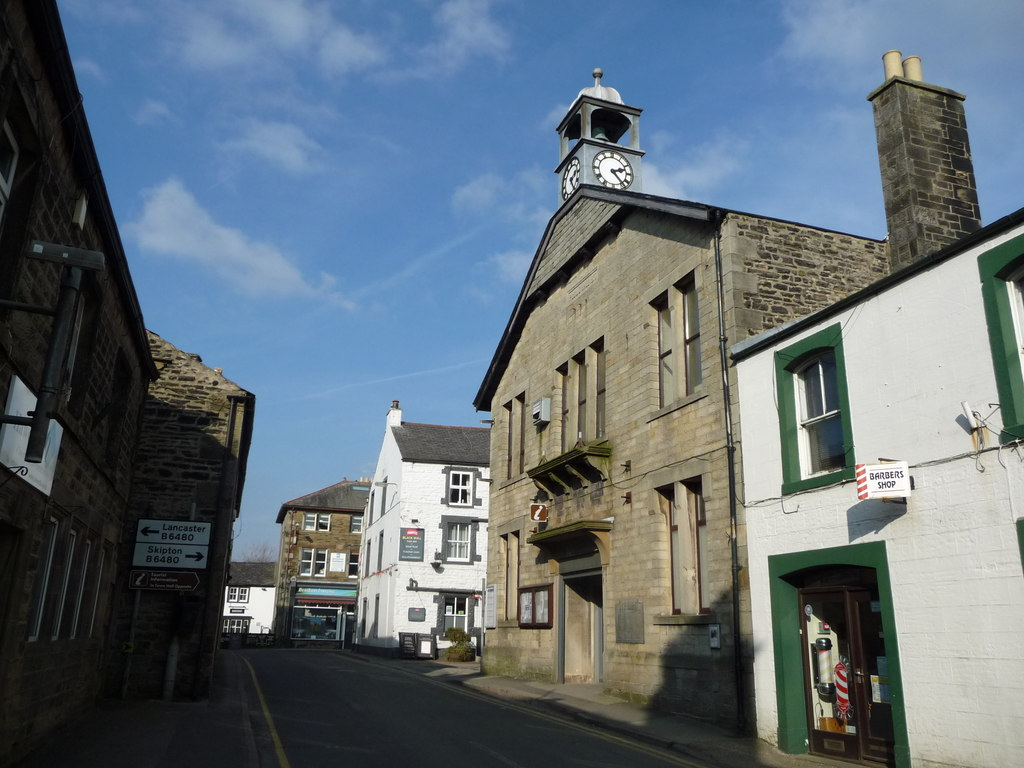
- The building in 2018

- Shown in North Yorkshire
- 54.1177°N 2.5099°W
- Location: Station Road, Bentham

History
- Built: 1877

Site notes
- Architectural style: Neoclassical style

Bentham Town Hall, also known as High Bentham Town Hall, is a municipal building in Station Road, High Bentham, a town in North Yorkshire, England. The building currently accommodates Bentham Town Council but is also used as a community events venue and a tourist information office.

== History ==
Following significant population growth, largely associated with the farming industry, parish leaders decided to commission a public hall for the town in the early 1870s. The new building was designed in the neoclassical style, built in ashlar stone and was completed in 1877.

The design involved a symmetrical main frontage of three bays facing onto Station Road. The central bay featured a large opening flanked by brackets supporting a cornice on the ground floor and a tri-partite window with a window sill supported by brackets on the first floor. The outer bays were fenestrated by bi-partite windows on both floors. The frontage was surmounted by a gable with a panel inscribed "Public Hall 1877" in the tympanum. Internally, the principal rooms were a market hall on the ground floor, and an assembly hall on the first floor.

A clock tower with a belfry and a dome was added in 1902, to commemorate the Coronation of King Edward VII and Queen Alexandra; the hour-striking clock (by Potts of Leeds) was set going the following year. A rectangular bronze plaque, intended to commemorate the lives of local service personnel who had died in the First World War, was attached to the front of the building in the early 1920s. The town hall also served as a venue for local farm auctions; however, there was some derision in 1937, when the satirical magazine Punch quoted an unnamed local paper as reporting: "Three farmers in the Bentham District came under the hammer at a property sale held by Mr Richard Turner of Bentham in the Bentham Town Hall on Wednesday afternoon and were all disposed of".

For much of the 20th century, the building served as the meeting place of the parish council: it was also used for concerts and theatre performances. Following the re-organisation of local government in 1974, the parish council became Bentham Town Council. The town council continued to hold its meetings in the town hall. In 2004, an extensive programme of works, financed by a grant from North Yorkshire County Council, was initiated. The works included the installation of a new lobby area, a kitchen and a lift, as well as the creation of some office space. Amidst some rationalisation of local facilities, various services, including the town clerk's office and the tourist information office, were subsequently moved into the town hall.
