= Wennington Hall =

Historic site in Lancashire, England

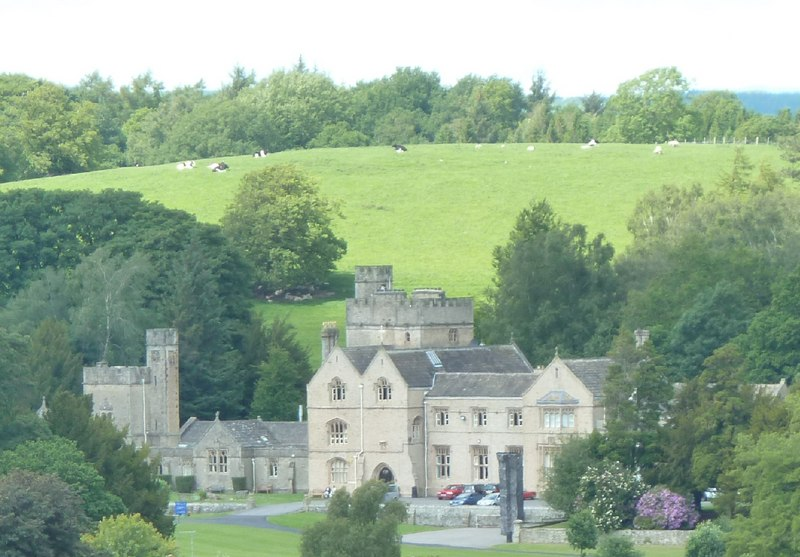

- Location within the City of Lancaster district
- 54.1288°N 2.5908°W
- Location: Wennington, Lancashire

Site notes
- Architect: E. G. Paley

Listed Building – Grade II
- Official name: Wennington Hall
- Designated: 4 December 1985
- Reference no.: 1165274

Wennington Hall is a former country house in Wennington, a village in the City of Lancaster district in Lancashire, England. The house is a Grade II listed building and from 1940 until 2022 was used as a school, at first by the Quaker boarding school Wennington School before its move to Yorkshire, then by Lancashire County Council.

== History ==
In its early history, Wennington Hall was the seat of William de Wennington. and in the 14th century, it passed to the Morley family. In 1674 the hall was sold to Henry Marsden, MP for Clitheroe. It descended to Henry Marsden, who lived at the hall with his younger brother John, known as "Silly Marsden", and their aunt. Henry died in 1780 from alcoholism and John was induced by his guardian aunt and her ambitious husband to sell the hall and buy Hornby Castle, Lancashire. Wennington was bought in 1788 by the Rev Anthony Lister, who took the surname Marsden. The hall was later sold to Richard Saunders in 1841.

The present building on the site, designed by Lancaster architect Edward Graham Paley, was constructed in 1855–56 for Richard's son William Allen Francis Saunders, High Sheriff of Lancashire in 1862. After him it passed to Charles Morley Saunders and later William Morley Saunders. During the Second World War it housed the Wennington School, who moved to Ingmanthorpe Hall in Yorkshire at the end of the war.

From 1954 until 2022 it was occupied by Wennington Hall School, a Lancashire County Council boarding school for boys with learning or behavioural difficulties.

After the school's closure the building was acquired by Bowland Inns & Hotels; in 2023 planning permission was granted for its conversion to a hotel. It is expected to open in spring 2024.

Wennington Hall was designated as a Grade II listed building on 4 December 1985. The Grade II designation—the lowest of the three grades—is for buildings that are "nationally important and of special interest".

== Architecture ==
Wennington Hall is built of sandstone rubble. Most of the roofs are stone slate. The plan is asymmetric and there is a large crenellated tower to the rear. The front facade is gabled. The house is in two storeys, and is in Tudor Revival style. Inside the house is a staircase hall with a hammerbeam roof, and stained glass. Connected to the main building, there is a stable block that has its own crenellated tower. The main section of the building is in Tudor revival style with wooden beams going across the ceiling of the central section of the building. The main door still remains in its original form and has been treated with care, the walls of the grounds still also remain in their original forms.

== See also ==
- Listed buildings in Wennington, Lancashire
- List of works by Sharpe and Paley
