= Wennington School =

Defunct school in Lancashire, England

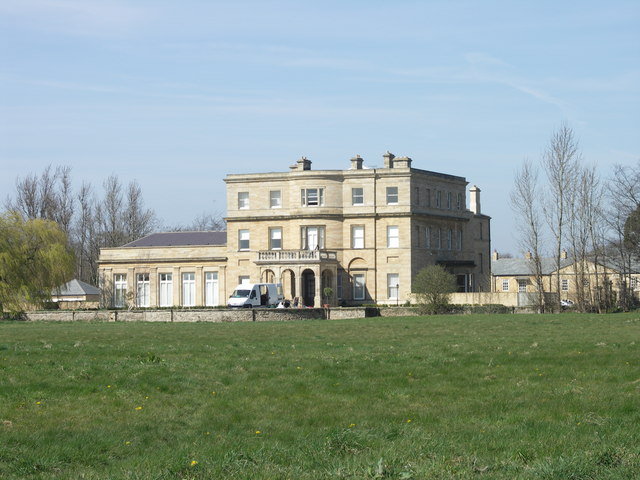
- Ingmanthorpe Hall

Information
- School type: Boarding school
- Established: 1940
- Founder: Kenneth C. Barnes
- Closed: 1975
- Gender: Mixed

Wennington School, founded by the Quaker educationalist Kenneth C. Barnes, was a co-educational and ultimately progressive boarding school.

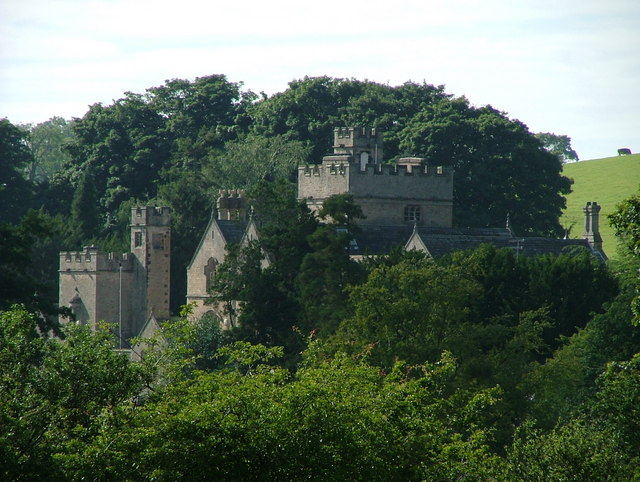
Wennington Hall

== History ==
It was founded in 1940 in Lonsdale, Lancashire, England. Early governors included Alfred Schweitzer and John Macmurray. During the Second World War the school was housed in Wennington Hall and after the war it relocated to Ingmanthorpe Hall near Wetherby, Yorkshire where it remained until its closure in 1975.

Headmasters included translator and poet Brian Merrikin Hill. The building was used in some episodes of the television series The Darling Buds of May.

== Notable alumni ==
- William "Hammy" Howell – musician
- Peter Lawrence – developmental biologist
- Nicholas Maw – composer
- John Merrill – author and walker
