= List of non-ecclesiastical works by Austin and Paley (1916–1944) =

Austin and Paley was the title of a practice of architects in Lancaster, Lancashire, England, in the first half of the 20th century. The practice was founded in 1836 by Edmund Sharpe. Between 1895 and 1914 the partners had been Hubert Austin and Henry Paley. Henry Paley had joined the practice as a partner in 1886 when his father, E. G. Paley, was Austin's partner; the practice then became known as Paley, Austin and Paley. E. G. Paley died in 1895 and the practice continued under the title of Austin and Paley. Austin's son, Geoffrey, joined the practice as a partner in 1914 and for a short time the practice was known as Austin, Paley and Austin. Hubert Austin died in 1915. Geoffrey Austin was on active service during the First World War and did not return to the practice, so Henry Paley continued the business of the firm as the sole partner from this time. For a time the practice continued with the title of Austin, Paley and Austin but around 1925 it reverted to the title of Austin and Paley. Henry Paley retired in 1936 but some work continued to be done by the practice until at least 1942; it was finally wound up around 1944.

This list covers the non-ecclesiastical works executed by the practice after 1916. These works include vicarages, a new school, additions to pre-existing schools and hospitals, an army headquarters, war memorials, and alterations to houses. Because of the location of the practice, most of the non-ecclesiastical work was in the areas that are now Cumbria, Lancashire, and Greater Manchester, but examples can also be found in North Yorkshire, Staffordshire and Nottinghamshire.

== Key ==
Grade	Criteria
Grade II*	Particularly important buildings of more than special interest.
Grade II	Buildings of national importance and special interest.
"—" denotes a work that is not graded.

== Works ==
Name	Location	Photograph	Date	Notes	Grade
War Memorial	Beetham, Cumbria; 54.2095°N 2.7733°W		1919	A sandstone memorial in the form of a Celtic cross, with the carving of an angel and a lily on its head. It is surrounded by limestone walls.	II
War Memorial	Great Salkeld, Cumbria; 54.7237°N 2.6974°W	—	c. 1919	A red sandstone memorial in the form of a Celtic cross in the churchyard of St Cuthbert's Church.	II
War Memorial	Pilling, Lancashire; 53.93030°N 2.9103°W		1920	War memorial in the churchyard of St John the Baptist's Church.	—
War Memorial	Caton, Lancashire		1922	War memorial.	—
Sedbergh School	Sedbergh, Cumbria; 54.3207°N 2.5286°W		1922–38	Wide range of additions, including a memorial cloister and a sanatorium.	—
Leeds Grammar School	Leeds, West Yorkshire; 53.8082°N 1.5616°W		1924–29	Added science labs and a swimming pool.	—
Vicarage	Bilsborrow, Lancashire; 53.852218°N 2.7426°W		1926	Vicarage to St Hilda's Church.	—
Beaumont Cote Hall	Slyne-with-Hest, Lancashire; 54.0878°N 2.7690°W		1927	Additions and two new cottages.	II
Victoria Institute	Caton, Lancashire		1928	Extensions.	—
Christ Church School	Lancaster, Lancashire		1928–29	Additions and alterations	—
St Luke's Junior School	Skerton, Lancashire; 54.058°N 2.798°W		1928–29	New school.	—
Headquarters	Carnforth, Lancashire		1929	Headquarters for the King's Own Royal Regiment (Lancaster).	—
Penny's Hospital	King Street, Lancaster, Lancashire; 54.0479°N 2.8026°W		1929	Restoration.	II*
Casterton School	Casterton, Cumbria; 54.2117°N 2.5753°W		1929–30	Additional classrooms.	—
Giggleswick School	Giggleswick, North Yorkshire; 54.0728°N 2.2939°W		1929–30	Sanatorium and chemistry laboratory.	—
Royal Lancaster Infirmary	Lancaster, Lancashire; 54.0441°N 2.7993°W		1929–41	Alterations and additions, including nurses' home, kitchen, maternity and children's ward, staff dining room and X-ray department.	—
Church Gate House	Melling, Lancashire; 54.1348°N 2.6171°W		1930	Alterations.	II
St Peter's School	Balmoral Road, Lancaster, Lancashire; 54.0466°N 2.7930°W		1930–31	Alterations to the senior school.	II
Vicarage	Worksop, Nottinghamshire		1931	A vicarage for St Anne's Church.	—
Vicarage	Orrell, Greater Manchester		1931–32	Vicarage for St Luke's Church.	—
Heaves House	Levens, Cumbria; 54.2735°N 2.7735°W		1932	Alterations to the house. Now a hotel.	II
Lancaster Royal Grammar School	East Road, Lancaster, Lancashire; 54.0471°N 2.7901°W		1933	Added a dormitory block.	II
School	Barton-upon-Irwell, Greater Manchester		Undated	New school.	—

== See also ==
- Lists of works by Sharpe, Paley and Austin
