= Lists of works by Sharpe, Paley and Austin =

Edmund Sharpe, Edward Paley, Hubert Austin, Henry Paley and Geoffrey Austin were architects who worked alone or in different partnerships in a practice in Lancaster, Lancashire, England, for two periods in the late 19th and early 20th centuries.

For lists of their works at different phases of the practice see:

- List of architectural works by Edmund Sharpe
- List of works by Sharpe and Paley
- List of ecclesiastical works by E. G. Paley
- List of non-ecclesiastical works by E. G. Paley
- List of ecclesiastical works by Paley and Austin
- List of non-ecclesiastical works by Paley and Austin
- List of works by Paley, Austin and Paley
- List of ecclesiastical works by Austin and Paley (1895–1916)
- List of non-ecclesiastical works by Austin and Paley (1895–1914)
- List of ecclesiastical works by Austin and Paley (1916–44)
- List of non-ecclesiastical works by Austin and Paley (1916–44)
