= St Margaret's Church, Hornby =

Coordinates: 54.1114°N 2.6362°W

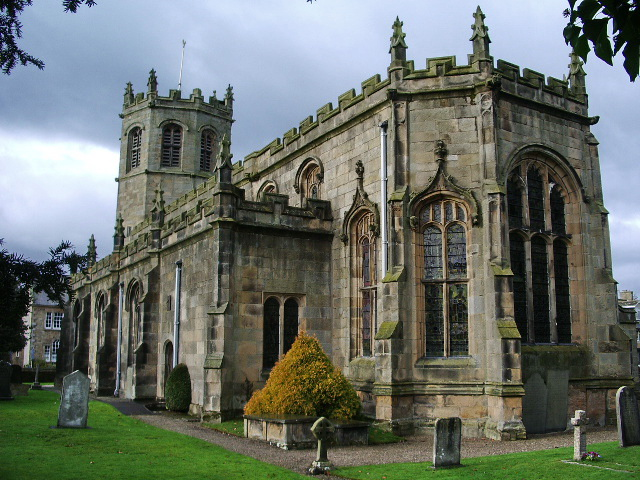
- St Margaret's Church, Hornby, from the southeast

- Location in the City of Lancaster district
- OS grid reference: SD 58506 68578
- Location: Main Street, Hornby, Lancashire
- Country: England
- Denomination: Anglican
- Website: Hornby, St Margaret

History
- Status: Parish church

Architecture
- Functional status: Active
- Heritage designation: Grade I
- Designated: 4 October 1967
- Architect: Paley, Austin and Paley (restoration)
- Architectural type: Church
- Style: Gothic, Gothic Revival
- Completed: 1889

Specifications
- Capacity: 290
- Length: 93 feet (28 m)
- Materials: Sandstone ashlar

Administration
- Province: York
- Diocese: Blackburn
- Archdeaconry: Lancaster
- Deanery: Tunstall
- Parish: Hornby with Claughton

Clergy
- Vicar: Rev Lucie Lunn

St Margaret's Church is in Main Street, Hornby, Lancashire, England. The church is recorded in the National Heritage List for England as a designated Grade I listed building. It is an active Anglican parish church in the diocese of Blackburn, the archdeaconry of Lancaster and the deanery of Tunstall. Its benefice is combined with those of St Michael, Whittington, St John, Arkholme, and St John, Gressingham.

== History ==
A church was on the site in 1338.

The oldest part of the current church is the tower, which was built by Sir Edward Stanley, Lord Mounteagle, in 1514. Lord Mounteagle also arranged for the rebuilding of the chancel but this was incomplete when he died in 1524.

In 1817 the old nave was demolished and replaced by a new nave. In 1888–89 a Victorian restoration was carried out by the Lancaster architects Paley, Austin and Paley. The nave was largely rebuilt, arcades and a clerestory were inserted, the church was reroofed and refloored, the west gallery was removed, the box pews were replaced by modern seating, the vestry was converted into an organ chamber, and a new vestry was built; this was done at an estimated cost of £3,000 (equivalent to £340,000 in 2025).

A stained glass window from 1908 commemorates St Cecilia, gifted by survivors of William Henry Foster, as inscribed in the dedication. Unusually, it shows lady's slipper orchids (Cypripedium calceolus) at her feet.

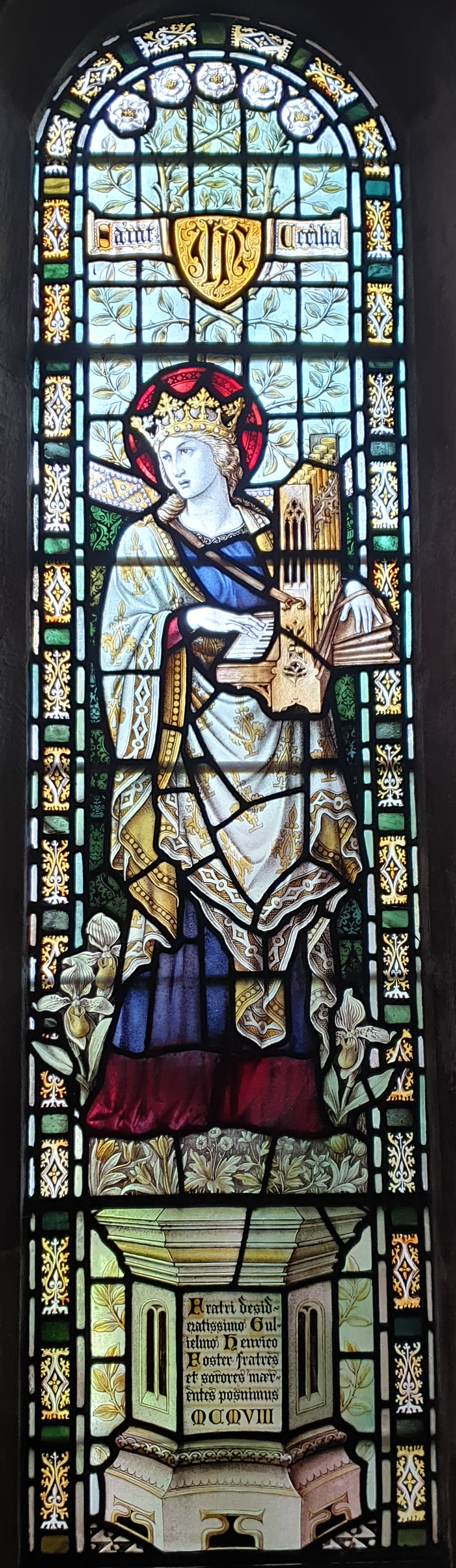
St Cecilia stained glass window in St Margaret's Church, Hornby, 1908

== Architecture ==
=== Exterior ===
The church is built in sandstone ashlar and its plan consists of a west tower, a nave and chancel under a continuous roof with a clearstory, and north and south aisles. The tower has three stages and is octagonal with the two upper stages being set diagonally to the base. Its parapet is embattled with pinnacles. The middle stage has a clock and a plaque carved with the Mounteagle arms. The nave and aisles have embattled parapets. At the east end is a semi-octagonal apse.

=== Interior ===
In the church is a monument to Dr Lingard, the Roman Catholic priest from St Mary's Church, Hornby, who died in 1851. Also in the church are two fragments of Anglo-Saxon crosses. The organ was built by Abbott and Smith and moved to St Margaret's from Hornby Castle in 1899. It was renovated by Ainscough around 1950 and restored by Harrison & Harrison in 1986. There is a ring of eight bells. Six of these were cast by Abel Rudhall in 1761 and the other two by Mears and Stainbank of the Whitechapel Bell Foundry in 1922. The parish register of baptisms begins in 1742 and that of burials in 1763.

== External features ==
In the churchyard is a sandstone Anglo-Saxon cross base which is listed at Grade II*. The churchyard also contains the war grave of a Manchester Regiment officer of World War II.

== See also ==
- Grade I listed churches in Lancashire
- Grade I listed buildings in Lancashire
- Listed buildings in Hornby-with-Farleton
- List of works by Paley, Austin and Paley
