= Hornby-with-Farleton =

Civil parish in Lancashire, England

Coordinates: 54.111°N 2.636°W

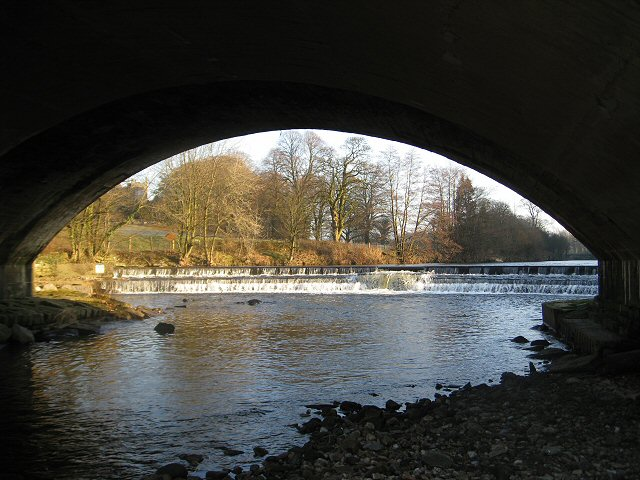
- River Wenning at Hornby Bridge

- Location in the City of Lancaster district Location in the Forest of Bowland Location within Lancashire
- Population: 730 (2011)
- OS grid reference: SD584684
- Civil parish: Hornby-with-Farleton
- District: Lancaster
- Shire county: Lancashire
- Region: North West
- Country: England
- Sovereign state: United Kingdom
- Post town: LANCASTER
- Postcode district: LA2
- Dialling code: 015242
- Police: Lancashire
- Fire: Lancashire
- Ambulance: North West
- UK Parliament: Morecambe and Lunesdale

Hornby-with-Farleton is a civil parish in the City of Lancaster in Lancashire, England. It had a population of 729 recorded in the 2001 census, increasing marginally to 730 at the 2011 census. The parish is about 8.5 miles (13.7 km) north-east of Lancaster and consists of two villages: Hornby and Farleton, both on the A683 road. The parish was formed 24 March 1887 from the parishes of "Hornby" and "Farleton".

== See also ==
- Listed buildings in Hornby-with-Farleton
- Hornby Priory
