= Henry Marsden (MP) =

Henry Marsden (c.1625 – 4 January 1688) was an English landowner and Member of Parliament.

He was the son of John Marsden, a Clitheroe headmaster and educated as an attorney at Staple Inn and Gray's Inn. In 1674 he bought Wennington Hall in Wennington, Lancashire from the Morley family.

He was a justice of the peace for the West Riding of Yorkshire from 1667 to his death, for Lancashire from 1676 to his death and for Gloucestershire and Carmarthenshire from 1680 to his death. He was a deputy Lieutenant of Lancashire from 1680 to his death.

He was elected MP for Clitheroe in 1680 and 1681.

He died in 1688. He had married Jennet, the daughter of Adam Mort of Preston, Lancashire, with whom he had six daughters.
