= Hornby, Lancashire =

Village in Lancashire, England

Coordinates: 54.113°N 2.637°W

Hornby
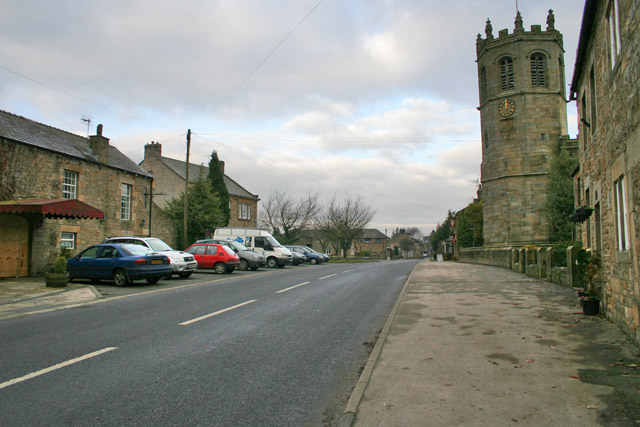
- Main Street

- Location in the City of Lancaster district Location in the Forest of Bowland Location within Lancashire
- Area: 0.2025 km^{2} (0.0782 sq mi)
- Population: 468 (2011 census)
  - Density: 2,311/km^{2} (5,990/sq mi)
- Civil parish: Hornby-with-Farleton
- District: Lancaster
- Shire county: Lancashire
- Region: North West
- Country: England
- Sovereign state: United Kingdom
- Post town: LANCASTER
- Postcode district: LA2
- Dialling code: 015242
- Police: Lancashire
- Fire: Lancashire
- Ambulance: North West
- Website: https://www.hornbyvillage.org.uk/

Hornby is a village in the civil parish of Hornby-with-Farleton, within the Lancaster district of the county of Lancashire, England. It is 9 miles (14 km) from Lancaster, situated on the A683 the village lies at the confluence of the River Wenning and Lune In 2011 the built up area had a population of 468.

== History ==
Hornby, originally recorded in the Domesday Book as Hornebi, served as a township and chapelry within Melling parish. In 1866, Hornby attained the status of a civil parish in its own right. However, on 24 March 1887, it was merged with Farleton to form the new parish of "Hornby-with-Farleton". In 1881, the parish had a population of 358.

== Amenities ==
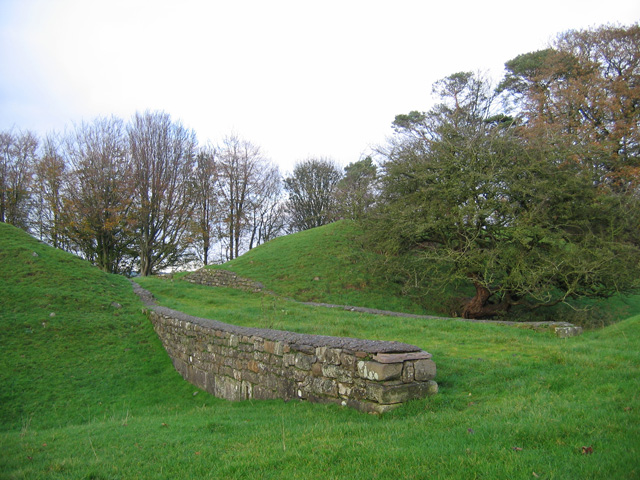
Castle Stede

Hornby has a church called St Margaret's Church on Main Street, with its octagonal tower and a county house called Hornby Castle which overlooks the village. It was started in the 13th century as a replacement for Castle Stede. The tower is 16th-century but the rest was constructed during the 18th and 19th centuries. Despite the castle now being divided into flats, it is still one of the most recognisable points of the village. Hornby Castle and grounds are private, although the gardens are open two weekends each year in February for snowdrops and May with a small entrance fee. There is no access to castle buildings, but most of the grounds are available to walk around freely on these dates. The gardens also feature a walled garden with plants for sale., a primary school called Hornby St. Margaret's C of E Primary School on Main Street, and a village institute on Main Street. A mile to the north of the castle are the earthwork remains of Castle Stede, a motte-and-bailey castle dating from the eleventh or twelfth century.

Hornby formerly had a high school called Hornby High School that closed in August 2009.
