= Farleton, Lancashire =

Hamlet in Lancashire, England

Coordinates: 54.0967°N 2.6546°W

Farleton
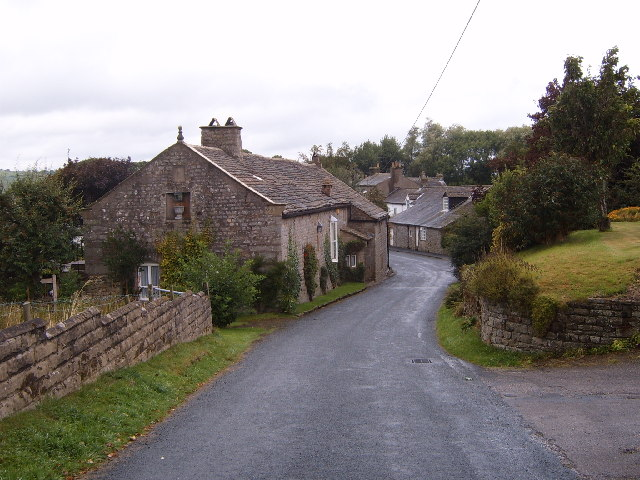

- Location in the City of Lancaster district Location within Lancashire
- OS grid reference: SD572669
- Civil parish: Hornby-with-Farleton
- District: Lancaster
- Shire county: Lancashire
- Region: North West
- Country: England
- Sovereign state: United Kingdom
- Post town: LANCASTER
- Postcode district: LA2
- Dialling code: 01524
- Police: Lancashire
- Fire: Lancashire
- Ambulance: North West
- UK Parliament: Morecambe and Lunesdale

Farleton is a hamlet in the civil parish of Hornby-with-Farleton, in the Lancaster district, in the county of Lancashire, England. Farleton lies in the north of the county just to the south of the main A683 road, some 8½ miles northeast of Lancaster. The Toll House, a Grade II listed building was, in the 1920s, a garage.

== History ==
The name "Farleton" may mean "the tūn of Faraldr or Farle". Farleton was recorded in the Domesday Book as Fareltun. Farleton was formerly a township in the parish of Melling, in 1866 Farleton became a separate civil parish. On 24 March 1887 the parish was abolished and merged with Hornby to form "Hornby with Farleton". In 1881 the parish had a population of 120.

== White lines ==
In about 1922, John Willacy who then owned the garage on the main road at Farleton painted a white line to alert drivers to the bend after several accidents. This may be the earliest recorded road surface marking, although there is reportedly a Canadian claim contesting this.
