= Bentham, North Yorkshire =

Civil parish in North Yorkshire, England

Coordinates: 54.118°N 2.510°W

Bentham
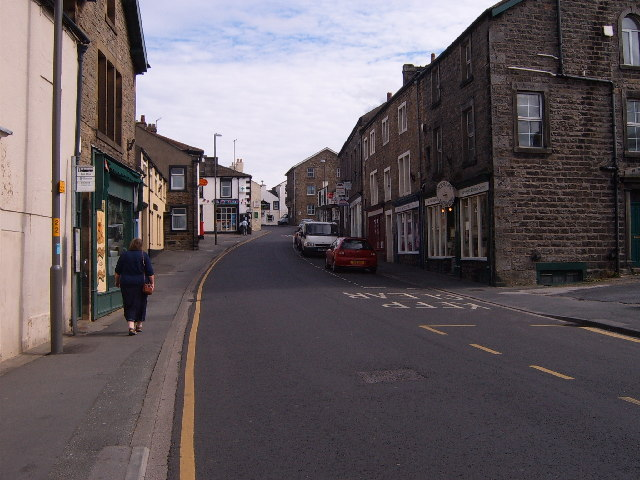
- High Bentham main street

- Location within North Yorkshire
- Population: 3,027 (2011 census)
- OS grid reference: SD666693
- Civil parish: Bentham
- Unitary authority: North Yorkshire
- Ceremonial county: North Yorkshire
- Region: Yorkshire and the Humber
- Country: England
- Sovereign state: United Kingdom
- Post town: LANCASTER
- Postcode district: LA2
- Dialling code: 01524
- Police: North Yorkshire
- Fire: North Yorkshire
- Ambulance: Yorkshire
- UK Parliament: Skipton and Ripon

Bentham is a civil parish in North Yorkshire, England, with a population of 3,027 at the 2011 Census. The parish includes the town High Bentham, occasionally known as Higher Bentham or just Bentham, and the older adjacent village Low Bentham.

The town lies on the River Wenning, just west of the Yorkshire Dales National Park and on the northern edge of the Forest of Bowland. The original centre of the town lay in Low Bentham, but a market was granted to High Bentham in the 14th century, and it became a centre for weaving from the 18th century, particularly after weavers in the town discovered how to weave hosepipes from flax.

It was historically part of the West Riding of Yorkshire until 1974. From 1974 to 2023 it was part of the Craven District; it is now administered by the unitary North Yorkshire Council.

The name Bentham derives from the Old English beonethām meaning 'bentgrass village'.

== Governance ==
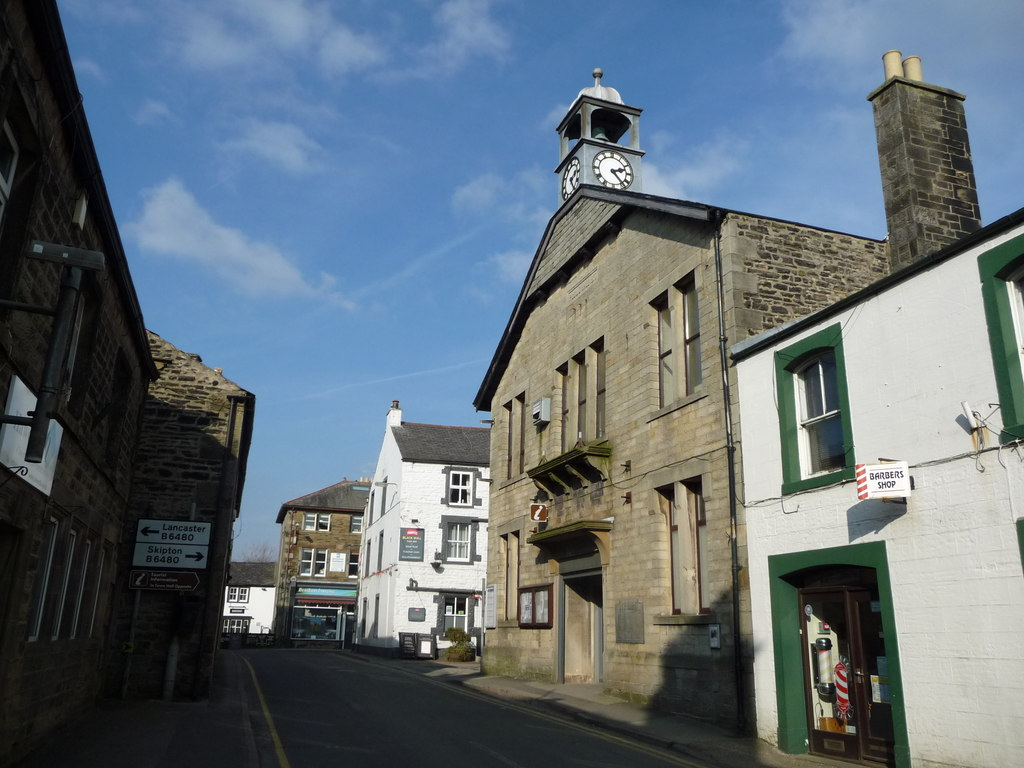
Bentham Town Hall

An electoral ward of the same name exists. This ward includes Burton in Lonsdale and well as the Bentham (Town) ward and has a total population taken at the 2011 census of 3,606. The ward falls within the Skipton and Ripon parliamentary constituency.

Bentham Town Council, which is responsible for local matters, is based at Bentham Town Hall, built in 1877. This facility includes several bookable spaces used by community groups and available for hire on a private basis, as well as housing the town's tourist information centre.

NHS Cumbria CCG is responsible for health matters for the population across the civil parish. Bentham Medical Practice is located centrally within the town.

== Community ==
The town has hosted an agricultural show since the middle of the 19th century. The event, which takes place annually on the first Saturday of September, is a traditional agricultural show with handicraft and horticulture as well as sheep, cattle and poultry competitions, but no horse classes. The 146th Bentham Agricultural Show was held in 2018 at the Bentham Auction Mart.

In addition to the traditional agricultural show, the town also hosts an annual Carnival procession in June of each year. After a themed street parade, the event usually culminates with a funfair and stalls hosted at Bentham Auction Mart.

The town's Auction Mart was founded in 1903 and provides an important venue for community events as well as regular livestock sales. The site hosts bonfire night fireworks and Christmas market events in addition to the Agricultural Show and Carnival.

Bentham is served by Bentham Community Primary School, which caters for children aged three to eleven and, as of 2016 had just under 150 students on its roll.

The Bentham News is the monthly community publication for the town. Established in 1982 the publication currently circulates over 2,000 copies which are delivered free by volunteers to every household in Bentham. The publication is also available at central points in the town and outlying areas.

Bentham Golf Club is located on Robin Lane to the northern edge of the town. The Club has an 18-hole course which was established in the 1920s. The course is set in the countryside to the south of the Three Peaks and is privately owned. The club is complimented by a publicly accessible driving range and a collection of luxury lodges and camping “pods” available for rental and purchase.

== Walking: Heritage Trails ==
Bentham has several circular heritage trails. There are three trails in total and these are colour coded, purple, pink and blue. The Purple Trail is 2 miles (3.2 km) long with a route through Ridding Lane Farm and over Shaky Bridge. This route is largely on footpaths and includes a number of stone styles along a circular route along the Wenning valley. The Pink Trail is 5 miles (8 km) long and extends the purple trail further along the river valley and also passes close by the Old Quarry in the northeast of the town, with a short section, about 0.3 miles (0.48 km), on the road. The Blue Trail is the longest of the three trails at over 9 miles (14 km). This route climbs up out of the town to the South and into the Forest of Bowland. The route included several ladder styles, and takes in the Great Stone of Fourstones known locally as Big Stone, where walkers can take in impressive views of the Yorkshire Three Peaks.

== Railway ==
The Leeds to Morecambe railway passes through the unstaffed Bentham Station. The station was opened in 1850 and has about 18,000 users per year. When it first opened it was owned by the "Little" North Western Railway, it was later bought by the Midland Railway and is now operated by Northern. The station is supported by Friends of Bentham Station (FOBS), a community group which has formally registered a stakeholder interest with Northern Rail.

== Media ==
Since the town is closest to the Lancashire and North Yorkshire border, local news and television programmes are provided by BBC North West and Granada Television that broadcast from Salford. The town is served by both BBC Radio Cumbria and BBC Radio Lancashire. Other radio stations that are also received the town are Greatest Hits Radio Harrogate and the Yorkshire Dales and Dales Radio. Local newspapers are Lancaster Guardian, The Westmorland Gazette, Craven Herald & Pioneer and Bentham News is a monthly local community newspaper which is delivered free by volunteers to every household in Bentham and to central points in local towns and villages.

== Churches ==
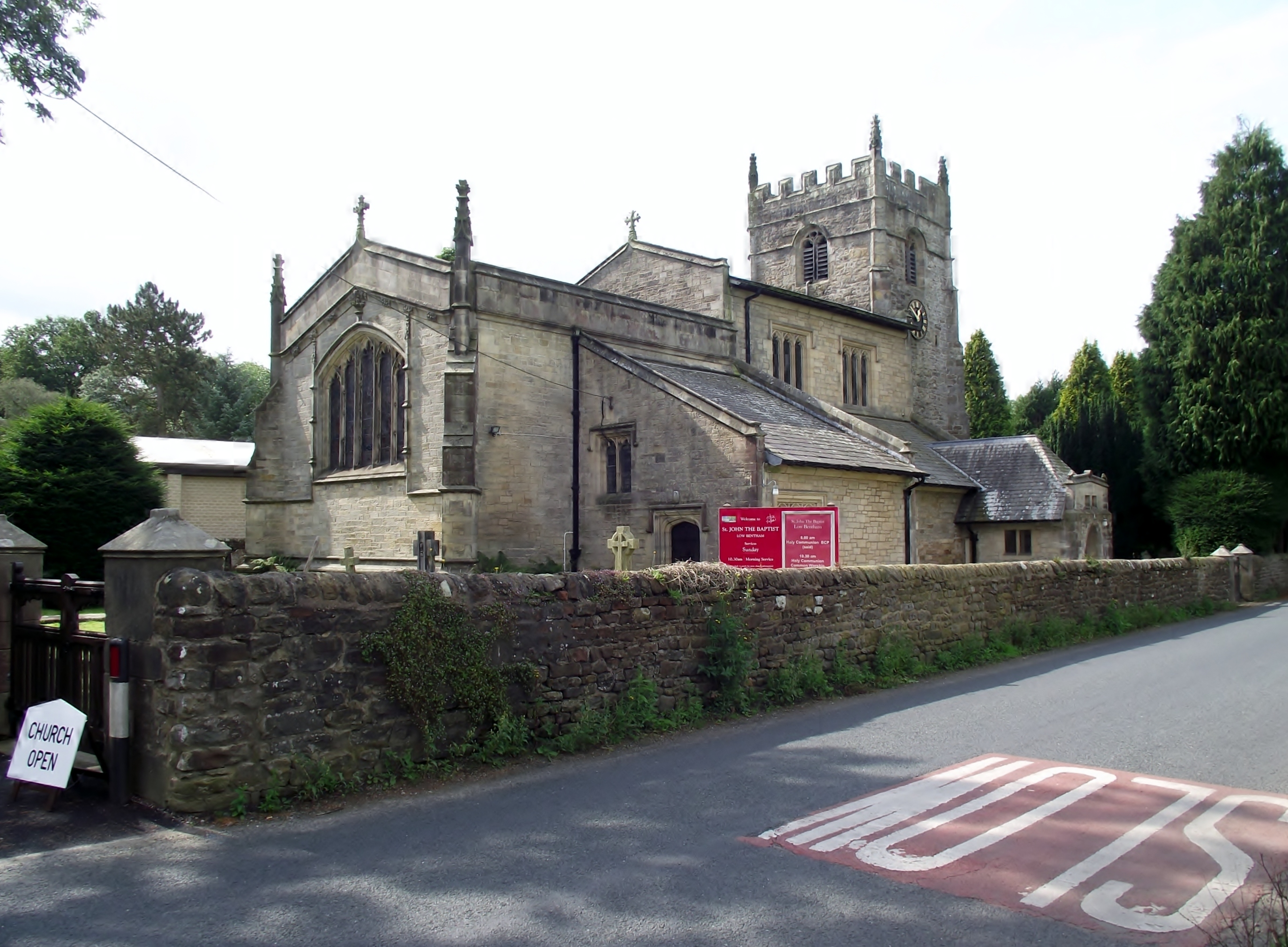
St John the Baptist church

There are two churches in High Bentham: St Boniface Roman Catholic Church and Bentham Methodist Chapel. St John the Baptist Church and Bentham Quakers Meeting House are in Low Bentham. Bentham has several youth groups for teenagers including the Bentham Youth Café (BYC) which is on Main Street and Monday's Youth Club which is organised by 4Youth. There are also separate youth drop-in sessions on Tuesday, Wednesday and Thursdays of each week which are also run by and held at the Youth Cafe. For younger children Springboard and Adventurers groups are held at the Methodist Church. St Margaret's Church in High Bentham closed in 2013 due to lack of funding for basic maintenance. It has now been carefully renovated and converted into two private homes.

St John the Baptist's Church, Low Bentham is one of the oldest churches in the area, and was noted in the Domesday Book in 1086. It is a grade II* listed building.

== See also ==
- Listed buildings in Bentham, North Yorkshire
