= River Wenning =

River in North Yorkshire and Lancashire, England

Coordinates: 54°06′N 2°39′W

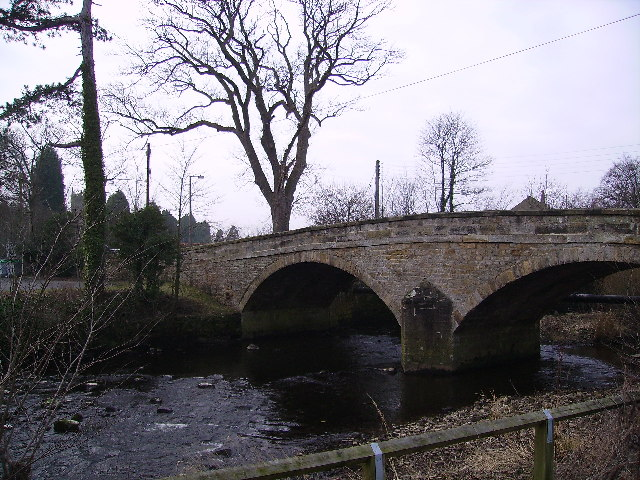
- The Wenning passing The Punch Bowl in Low Bentham
- Etymology: Old English: The dark river

Physical characteristics
- Length: 22.67 km (14.09 mi)

Basin features
- River system: Lune
- Tributaries
  - left: Keasden Beck, River Hindburn

The River Wenning is a tributary of the River Lune, flowing through North Yorkshire and Lancashire. The name derives from the Old English Wann, meaning dark river.

The Wenning is formed from the confluence of Clapham Beck, which rises above Clapham, and Austwick Beck, which rises in Crummackdale above Austwick. It then flows westwards through High Bentham, Low Bentham and Wennington.

The river flows for 14.09 miles (22.67 km) and drains an area of 24.9 square miles (64.6 km^{2}). It joins the River Lune approximately 1 mile (1.5 km) west of Hornby.

This river's valley, together with Airedale, Wharfedale and upper Ribblesdale, made up the former Craven District in North Yorkshire.
