= Listed buildings in Wray-with-Botton =

Wray-with-Botton is a civil parish in Lancaster, Lancashire, England. It contains 44 listed buildings that are recorded in the National Heritage List for England. All of the listed buildings are designated at Grade II, the lowest of the three grades, which is applied to "buildings of national importance and special interest". The parish contains the village of Wray, and is otherwise rural containing scattered farms. Apart from a bridge, all the listed buildings are houses, farmhouses, farm buildings, and structures associated with them.

== Buildings ==
Name and location	Photograph	Date	Notes
Above Beck and barn 54.09841°N 2.60025°W	—	17th century	The building is in sandstone with a stone-slate roof in two storeys. The left part of the original house projects forward and contains a mullioned window. The right part contains a single-storey gabled porch, and in the apex of the gable is the carved head and shoulders of a man. To the right is a later single bay, and to the right of this is a barn that has a wide entrance with a segmental arch. Inside the original part of the house is a bressumer.
Barn, Hoskin's Farm; 54.10246°N 2.60880°W	—	Mid 17th century	A farm building in sandstone with a stone-slate roof in two storeys. The part to the left originated as a house, and contains blocked mullioned windows and a blocked doorway with a moulded surround, a triangular head, and an inscribed lintel. The barn to the right dates probably from the late 18th century, and contains doorways and a pitching hole. On the left gable end are external steps leading to a first floor doorway.
1, 2 and 3 Holme Cottages; 54.10157°N 2.60659°W	—	1656	Two houses and a shop in sandstone with tile roofs in two storeys. No. 1 has two bays; one of the windows is mullioned and the others are modern. No. 2 has a wide shop window and a doorway with a chamfered surround and an inscribed battlemented lintel. No. 3 is lower with two bays. Inside No. 2 is a bressumer.
Birks Farmhouse and barns 54.09578°N 2.56515°W	—	1667 (possible)	The house and barns are in sandstone with roofs of slate and stone-slate. The house has two storeys, mullioned windows, and a three-storey gabled porch. The doorway in the porch has a moulded surround with a decorated inscribed lintel. Also on the front is a re-set doorway with an inscribed battlemented lintel. The barns date probably from the 18th century. To the right of the house is a barn that has a wide entrance with a segmental arch and a mullioned window, and at right angles is another barn containing ventilation slits.
Walnut Cottage; 54.10309°N 2.60958°W	—	1673	The front wall was rebuilt probably during the late 19th century. The house is in sandstone with a slate roof, and has two storeys and three bays. The windows are sashes. The doorway has a re-set chamfered surround, and a shaped lintel with a design and an inscription.
73 Main Street; 54.10204°N 2.60808°W	—	Late 17th century	A sandstone house with a slate roof in two storeys and two bays. The windows are modern, and the doorway has a chamfered surround and a battlemented lintel.
Beck Farmhouse; 54.09830°N 2.60018°W	—	Late 17th century	The farmhouse is in sandstone with a stone-slate roof. One window has a remaining mullion, and the doorway has a plain surround.
Friends' Meeting House; 54.10313°N 2.61034°W	—	Late 17th century	The former Quaker meeting house, later used as a church hall, is in sandstone with a stone-slate roof. It has a single storey and four bays with mullioned and transomed windows.
Farm store, Park House Farm; 54.09075°N 2.55827°W	—	Late 17th century	The building was originally part of a house. It is in sandstone with a stone-slate roof and has two storeys. The windows are mullioned, and in the south gable end is a doorway.
Hope Cottage; 54.10148°N 2.60758°W	—	Late 17th century	A sandstone house with a slate roof in two storeys. The original part has two bays, and it contains windows that were formerly mullioned. To the left is a later single-bay extension. In the right gable wall is a blocked first-floor fireplace that was originally in a cottage that has been demolished.
Roeburnside; 54.10137°N 2.60717°W	—	Late 17th century	The house is in sandstone with a tile roof and has two storeys. The earlier part has three bays and contains two doorways. To the left is an additional bay, also with a doorway. Inside the earlier part is a bressumer.
Summersgill Farmhouse; 54.06478°N 2.54881°W	—	Late 17th century	A sandstone house with a stone-slate roof, in two storeys with an attic, and with a single-storey extension to the north. The windows are mullioned. In the angle between the main part and the extension is a modern timber porch. The doorway has a re-set moulded surround with an inscribed segmental head.
Home Farmhouse and Home Farm Cottage; 54.10171°N 2.60580°W	—	1686	Two houses in rendered stone with a tile roof and mullioned windows. Home Farmhouse has three bays and a doorway with a moulded surround and an inscribed battlemented lintel. Home Farm Cottage, to the left, has two bays.
90, 91 and 92 Main Street; 54.10156°N 2.60776°W	—	1691	A row of three houses that originated as a house and farm buildings. They are in sandstone with a tile roof, and have two storeys. The windows are mullioned but some mullions have been removed. The doorway of No. 91 has a moulded surround and an inscribed shaped lintel.
Birks Holme Barn; 54.09732°N 2.56023°W	—	1691	A barn in sandstone with a roof partly of slate and partly of stone-slate. It contains a wide entrance and ventilation slits. There are two doorways with chamfered surrounds, one of which has an inscribed shaped lintel.
Cragg Hall; 54.09648°N 2.57567°W	—	1693	The house is in sandstone with a stone-slate roof. It consists of a main range with three parallel joined wings at the rear. The main range has three storeys with mullioned windows. The original doorway is in the west gable wall, and has a moulded surround, a shaped inscribed lintel, and a broken segmental pediment on consoles with a finial.
71 and 72 Main Street; 54.10238°N 2.60836°W	—	1694	Two sandstone houses with stone-slate roofs in two storeys with an attic. No. 72 on the right has three bays, some of the mullions have been retained in the windows, and the doorway has a moulded surround and an inscribed lintel. Inside is a bressumer. No. 71 dates probably from the 18th century, it has two bays, and above the lintel is a re-set inscribed moulded lintel.
Helks and farm buildings 54.06900°N 2.54077°W	—	Early 18th century (probable)	The house and farm buildings are in sandstone. The house has a slate roof, and is in two storeys and two bays with a central porch. The farm buildings have stone-slate roofs. To the right of the house is a farm building, and to the left is a barn that has a wide entrance with a segmental arch.
Bridge End House; 54.10168°N 2.60525°W	—	1732	The house is in sandstone, with a roof of slate at the front and stone-slate at the back. It has two storeys with an attic, and three bays. The windows are mullioned, apart from the central window in the upper floor that is a sash window. The central doorway has a chamfered surround, and above it is an inscribed shaped plaque.
Bridge End Cottage; 54.10166°N 2.60556°W	—	1734	A sandstone house with a slate roof in two storeys and two bays. The windows are mullioned, and the central single-storey gabled porch has a stone-slate roof. Above the porch is an inscribed oval plaque.
Post Office and house 54.10177°N 2.60818°W	—	1746	A house and shop in sandstone with a slate roof, in two storeys, with each part having two bays. On the right side of the ground floor is a bow window, the other windows being mullioned. The house to the left has sash windows. The doorways have plain surrounds.
94 Main Street; 54.10141°N 2.60732°W	—	Mid 18th century	A sandstone house with a stone-slate roof in two storeys. The earlier part has two bays with mullioned windows and a doorway. To the right is a two-bay extension with modern windows.
Curwen Hill Farmhouse and barn 54.10146°N 2.62489°W	—	Mid 18th century	The house and barn are in sandstone. The house has a stone-slate roof, and is in two storeys and two bays. The windows are mullioned, and the doorway has a plain surround with a plaque above. The barn to the right dates from the early 19th century and has a tile roof. It contains a wide entrance with a segmental arch containing a dated keystone, doorways with long-and-short jambs, a window, and a pitching hole.
Fern Cottage; 54.10352°N 2.61014°W	—	Mid 18th century	The house is in pebbledashed stone with a stone-slate roof. There are two storeys and the windows are mullioned.
Ivy Cottage and Ivy House; 54.10281°N 2.60879°W	—	Mid 18th century	A pair of sandstone houses with a stone-slate roof in two storeys. Ivy Cottage to the left has one bay and a doorway with a plain surround. Ivy House has two bays and its doorway has a moulded surround. The windows are mullioned.
Lane House and barn 54.09241°N 2.58143°W	—	Mid 18th century	The house and barn are in sandstone with a stone-slate roof and two storeys. The house has two bays, mullioned windows, and a doorway with a chamfered surround. The barn to the right has a wide entrance, a pitching hole, and two doorways, one of which is chamfered.
Oak Cottage; 54.10302°N 2.60942°W	—	Mid 18th century	The house is in sandstone with a stone-slate roof and it has two storeys and two bays. The windows are mullioned, and the central doorway has a moulded surround. Above the door is a hood of two pitched stone slates.
Top Cottage; 54.10174°N 2.60842°W	—	Mid 18th century	The house is in sandstone with a tile roof, in two storeys and two bays. The windows are mullioned, and the central doorway has a plain surround.
Park House Farmhouse; 54.09067°N 2.55820°W	—	1771	A sandstone house with a stone-slate roof in two storeys and three bays. The windows and doors have plain surrounds, the windows being sashes. Above the central door is a moulded inscribed plaque.
Botton Mill Cottage; 54.06697°N 2.53993°W	—	Late 18th century	A sandstone house with a stone-slate roof in two storeys and two bays. The windows on the southwest front are mullioned.
Burnside; 54.10168°N 2.60544°W	—	Late 18th century (probable)	The house is in sandstone with a slate roof, and has two storeys and two bays. The windows are sashes.
Barn, Park House Farm; 54.09084°N 2.55794°W	—	Late 18th century	A sandstone barn with a tile roof. In the northwest front are two wide entrances with segmental arches, two doorways, one with a chamfered surround, a window, and a pitching hole. The right gable wall contains a re-set moulded surround with an inscribed shaped lintel, above which is a sandstone sundial plaque flanked by pilasters.
New Inn; 54.10336°N 2.61182°W	—	1775	A public house in sandstone with a slate roof in two storeys. The main part has two bays and a central doorway with a hood on brackets. There are a further two bays to the right and one to the left. The windows are sashes. Further to the right is a projecting former stable with a pitching door.
Lower Thrushgill Farmhouse; 54.06129°N 2.53208°W	—	1798	A stone house with a stone-slate roof in two storeys with two bays. The windows are mullioned, the doorway has a plain surround, and above it is an oval inscribed plaque. To the right is an additional bay with sash windows, and at the rear is a large stair window.
Greystones and Nos. 1, 2 and 3 Greystones Cottages; 54.10268°N 2.60865°W	—	c. 1800	A row of four sandstone houses with a slate roof, in two storeys with sash windows. Greystones is canted and has three bays. No. 1 to the left has two bays, the left bay containing a wide entrance. Nos. 2 and 3 are to the right of Greystones and are mirrored with paired doorways in the centre. At the rear is a workshop.
Wray Bridge; 54.10151°N 2.60464°W		c. 1800	The bridge carries Main Street over the River Roeburn. It is in sandstone, and consists of a single segmental arch flanked by piers.
Wray House; 54.10329°N 2.60953°W	—	c. 1800	The house is in stuccoed stone with a slate roof, in two storeys with attics, and a five-bay front. The central three bays protrude forward and have chamfered quoins. The windows are sashes, and in the second bay is a Corinthian porch. At the rear is a re-set doorway with a moulded surround and a moulded inscribed lintel.
Poplar House; 54.10211°N 2.60813°W	—	Early 19th century	A sandstone house with a stone-slate roof in two storeys with an attic and with a three-bay front. The windows are sashes, and the central doorway has Doric pilasters. In the right gable wall is a re-set moulded door surround with an inscribed lintel.
Malvern House; 54.10275°N 2.60910°W	—	Early to mid 19th century	The house is in sandstone with two storeys and two bays. The windows are sashes, and the central doorway has a plain surround and a moulded hood.
Thistle House; 54.10185°N 2.60843°W	—	Early to mid 19th century	A sandstone house with a slate roof, in two storeys with an attic. It has a three-bay front with chamfered quoins. The windows are sashes with plain surrounds. The doorway has jambs treated as pilasters.
Windsor House; 54.10316°N 2.60922°W	—	Early to mid 19th century	The house is in sandstone with a hipped slate roof. It has two storeys and two bays on each front. The windows are sashes, and the doorway has a plain surround and a hood on brackets.
Holme Cottages; 54.10106°N 2.60567°W	—	1836	A pair of cottages with a mirrored front. They are in sandstone with a slate roof, and have two storeys. Each cottage has one bay with paired doorways in the centre. The windows are sashes, and above the doorways is an oval inscribed plaque.
Vicarage; 54.10377°N 2.60882°W	—	1840s	The vicarage is in sandstone with a slate roof, and has two storeys and three bays. Above the door and windows are hood moulds. The windows are sashes, those in the lower floor containing Gothick glazing. The left gable end has two bays and has a doorway with a chamfered surround.
High Park House Farmhouse and farm building 54.09046°N 2.55750°W	—	Mid 19th century	The building incorporates 17th-century material, and in sandstone with stone-slate roofs. The house has two storeys and two bays, and has modern windows. In the centre is a single-storey gabled porch containing a re-set outer doorway. This has a moulded surround with a triangular head and an inscribed lintel. To the left is a farm building with mullioned windows and a re-set shaped moulded and inscribed lintel. Further to the left is a blocked wide entrance, a pitching door, and a lean-to extension.
