= Richard Shilling =

British artist and photographer

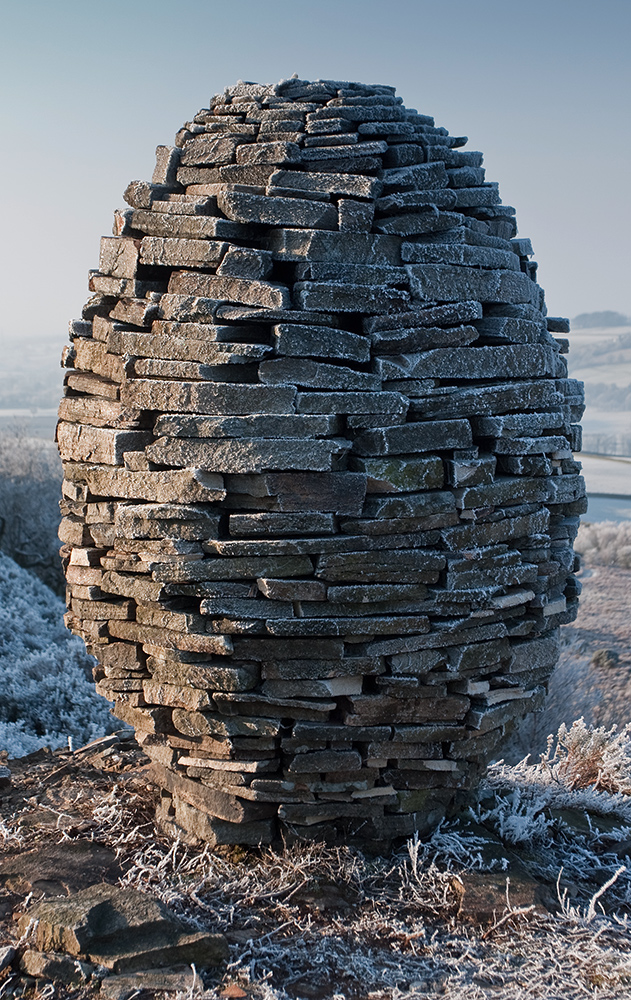
- "Clougha Egg Cairn"
- Born: 1973; Kent, England
- Known for: Land Art, photography
- Website: RichardShilling.co.uk

Richard Shilling (born 1973) is a British artist and photographer working in the field of land art and sculpture in the North West of England. He is currently artist in residence at The Middlewood Trust, Roeburndale. Shilling is known for his ephemeral and changing art works made from natural materials in natural settings outdoors. He is self-taught and works intuitively, hoping to become more familiar with and absorbed in the landscape.

== Early life ==
Shilling was born in Kent, UK. He spent his early life there, studying and working in Kent, before moving to Lancashire in 2005. It was on moving to the area that he first encountered the work of Andy Goldsworthy and became inspired to develop his artistic career. He has had no formal artistic training and began by copying Goldsworthy's sculptures closely to deconstruct his methods.

== Art works ==
Shilling's inspiration came from Andy Goldsworthy whose work he initially studied and copied, before developing his own style. He works in the field to create land art sculptures using only natural items from the surrounding area with which to make them. Frequent themes are balancing sculptures, seemingly precariously stacked, and geometric designs using seasonal colours and changing hues. The art can last for as little as a few minutes to several months and Shilling often revisits the art to document how it alters over time.

Shilling frequently photographs his works but uses only natural light, and often accompanies the work with short stories.

Shilling uses small, commonplace natural materials to draw attention to the beauty in nature that is often overlooked, for example creating circular or mandala type designs from leaves and sticks. By these methods he aims to "respect natural cycles, seasons, life and death." He has explained that the impermanence of his art means that for him his art is the process by which it is created, its insignificance in the wider landscape and its connectedness to nature, as well as a carpe diem reminder to appreciate beauty in the moment.

Shilling has created many commissioned art works including public work for Lakes Alive festival in Cumbria and Down By the Riverside festival in the Forest of Bowland. He has said that this can be a particular challenge as he doesn't wish to deviate from his method of only using foraged natural items from the surrounding area, and the materials he uses have an inherent ephemerality which can conflict with creating a public artwork which would last for several days.

He also teaches land art and holds workshops in Lancashire and Muncaster Castle, Cumbria and teaches both adult and children in the UK and abroad the techniques he uses. When working as a commissioned artist to a festival he often holds workshops on location. Shilling points out that as well as learning art techniques he likes to inspire people to improve their general health and wellbeing by reconnecting with the creative process and meeting other people in the outdoors.

=== Books ===
Shilling has self published 6 books, available in print and digital editions

- Land Art (2009)
- Wheel of Life (2009)
- Transience, ephemeral art in nature (2010)
- Flux (2011)
- Land Art for Kids, On the Beach (2009) with Julia Brooklyn
- Land Art for Kids, In the Woods (2010) with Julia Brooklyn

== See also ==
- Environmental art
- Environmental sculpture
- Nils-Udo
- Process art
- Rock balancing
