= Skerton Bridge =

Bridge in Lancashire, England

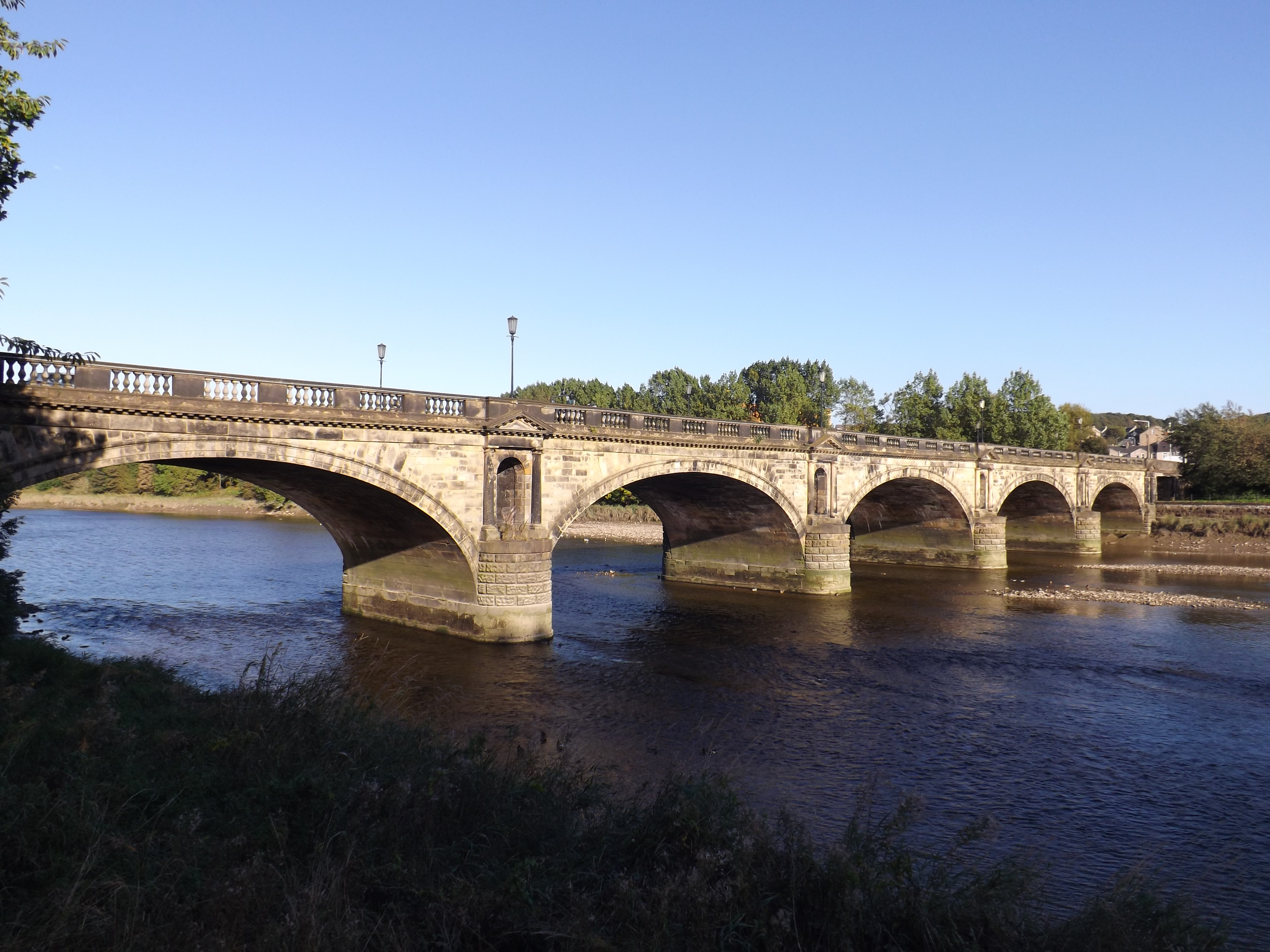
- Coordinates: 54.0545°N 2.7965°W
- Carries: A6 road (southbound lanes)
- Crosses: River Lune
- Locale: Lancaster, Lancashire, England
- Preceded by: Lune Aqueduct
- Followed by: Greyhound Bridge

Characteristics
- Design: Arch Bridge

History
- Opened: 1787

Listed Building – Grade II*
- Official name: Skerton Bridge
- Designated: 18 February 1970
- Reference no.: 1212253

Scheduled monument
- Official name: Skerton Bridge
- Reference no.: 1005109

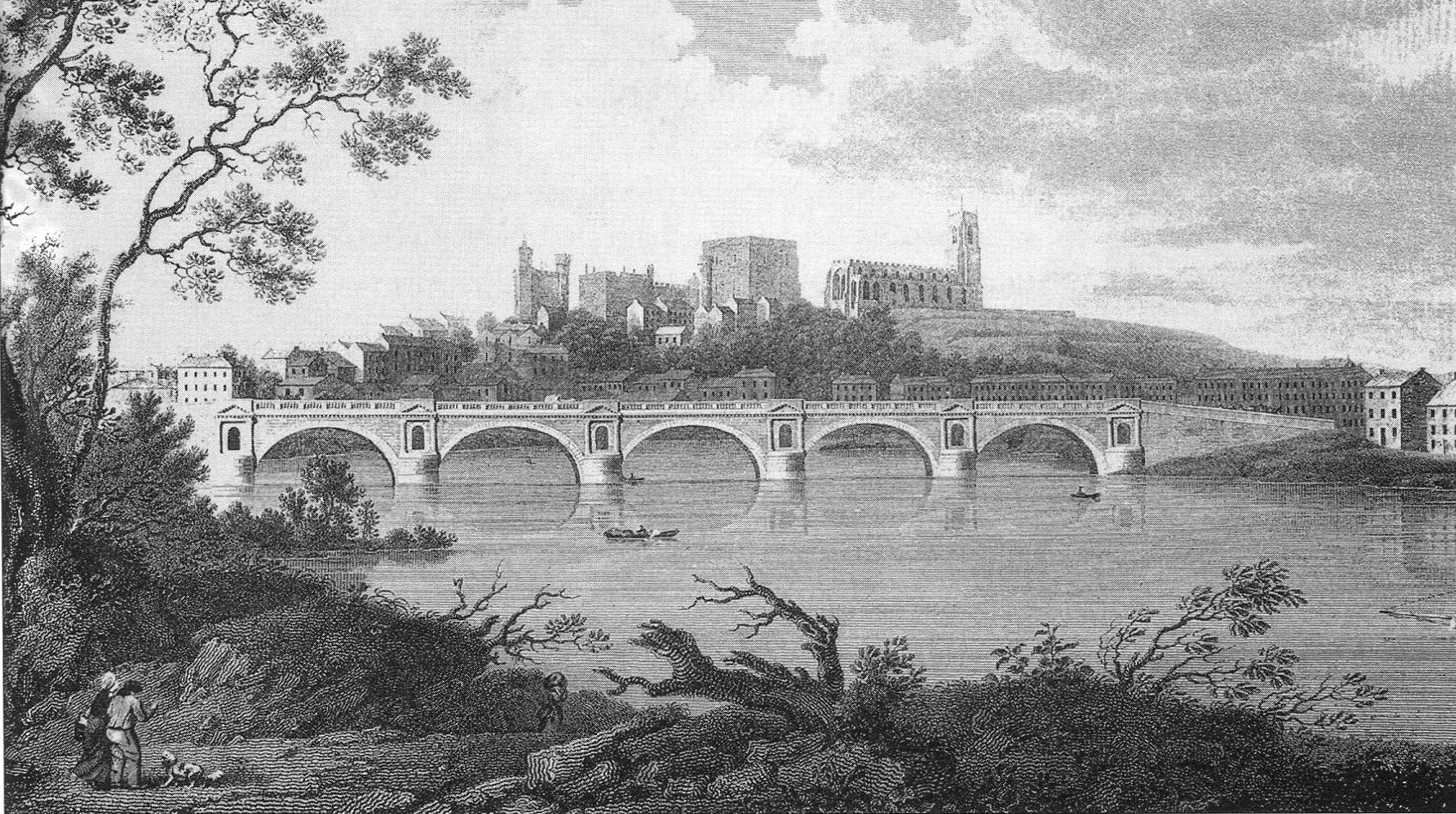
Engraving of the bridge by John Landseer dated 1791

Skerton Bridge is a road bridge carrying the southbound lanes of the A6 road over the River Lune in Lancaster, Lancashire, England. The bridge is recorded in the National Heritage List for England as a designated Grade II* listed building and scheduled monument.

== History ==
The history of a bridge at Skerton is somewhat amusingly related in Cross Fleury's 1891 publication Time-Honoured Lancaster, which notes that, with the looming arrival of the Jacobites in the first Rising of 1715, the people attempted to forestall a rapid occupation of the town by damaging the only link to the northern bank of the Lune (the Old Loyne Bridge), knocking the battlements off the sides of the existing bridge to its northern end. The Governors of the town had, in fact, planned to blow up the bridge but, upon being informed that the river was shallow enough to ford easily at numerous points, opted not to cause needless damage and settled for strategic demolition instead. The invading force was undeterred by this apparent effort to jeopardise their safe crossing over the water and, ironically, this partial demolition was to be the cause of numerous accidents for many years after, as travellers would occasionally lose control of their wagons and veer off the unprotected side of the bridge, the Jacobites having managed to cross without incident, in the first place.

Towards the end of 18th century, the Old Loyne Bridge had thereby become inadequate for its purpose. A petition was made for an Act of Parliament to allow for the building of a new bridge at a more convenient site; this was passed in June 1782. A competition was held for the design of the new bridge, which was won by Thomas Harrison, his first major commission. The first stone was laid in June 1783, and the bridge was completed in September 1787; it cost £14,000 (equivalent to £2,250,000 in 2023). In 1839 repair and repointing of the bridge was supervised by the local architect Edmund Sharpe. An additional arch was added to the south end of the bridge in about 1849 to allow for the passage of the "Little" North Western Railway (since closed) beneath it. It continues to be used as a road bridge, and when it was examined in 1995 it was considered to be strong enough to carry vehicles weighing up to 40 tons—ten times the weight of the heaviest vehicles in 1783.

== Architecture ==
The bridge is constructed in sandstone ashlar. It consists of five semi-elliptical arches with piers that are articulated by aedicules formed by attached Tuscan columns supporting pediments; it has a balustraded parapet. The semi-elliptical arches allow it to have a flat road deck. Each of the five original arches spans 64 feet (19.5 m), and the deck between the parapets is 33 feet (10.1 m) wide. There are stormwater channels in the spandrels between the arches and at the abutments.

== Context ==
Skerton Bridge was the first large public bridge in England to have a flat rather than a bowed roadway. There had been earlier bridges elsewhere with this feature, for example Coldstream Bridge (1763) in Scotland, designed by John Smeaton, and a bridge at Neuilly-sur-Seine, Paris (1768–74; demolished in 1939) by Jean-Rodolphe Perronet. Harrison's design influenced John Rennie in his designs of Kelso Bridge (1803), Waterloo Bridge (1809–17), and London Bridge (1824–31).

== See also ==
- Grade II* listed buildings in Lancashire
- Scheduled monuments in Lancashire
- Listed buildings in Lancaster, Lancashire
- List of works by Thomas Harrison
