= Birk Beck =

River in Cumbria, England

Coordinates: 54°26′25″N 2°35′58″W

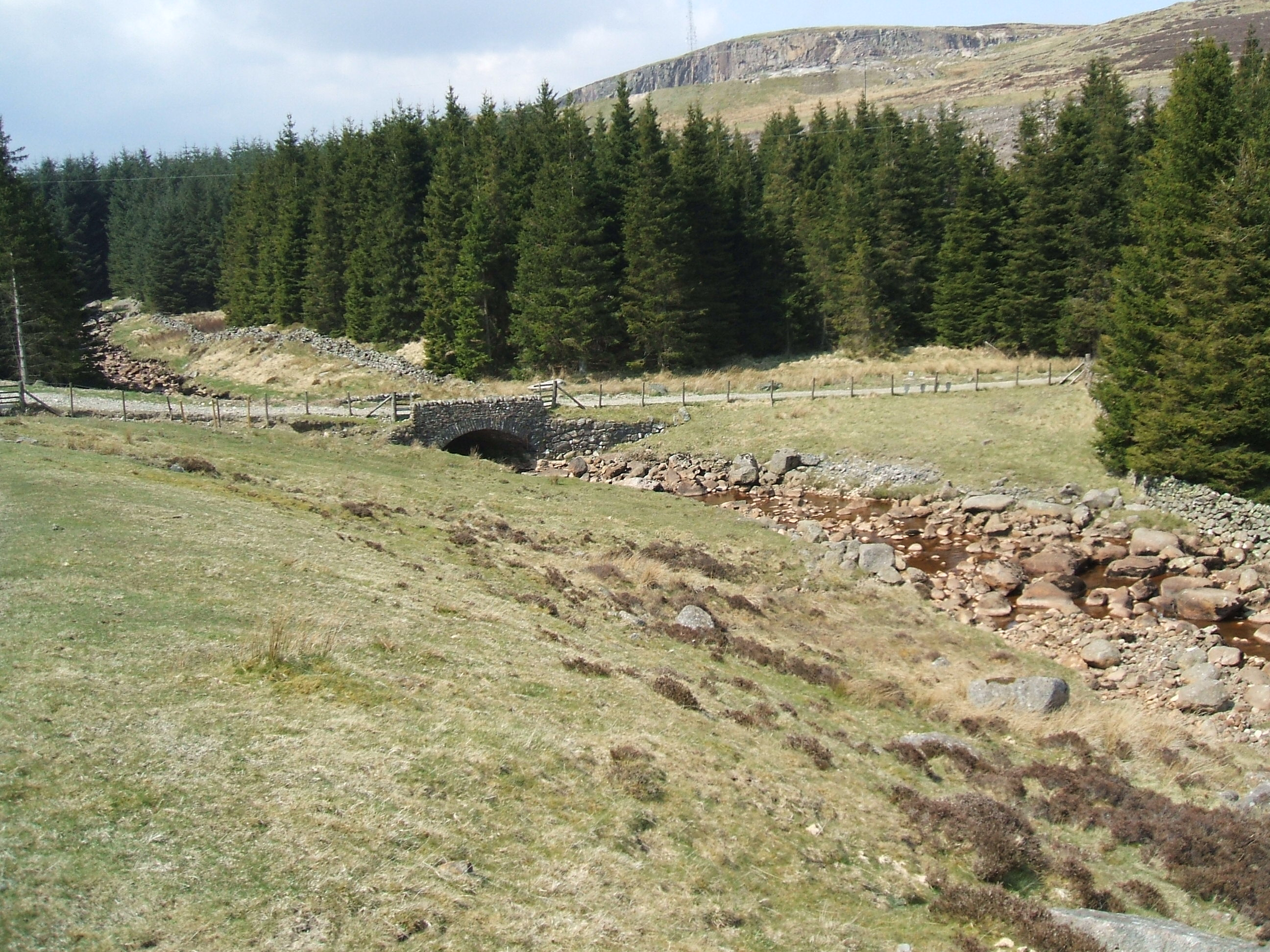
Wasdale Beck at Wasdale Old Bridge, south of Shap, with Shap Pink Quarry in the background

Birk Beck is a minor river in Cumbria.

Rising on the fells near Shap, the beck runs south-by-south east, picking up Wasdale Beck (running east and draining Yarlside and Gargill) and Bretherdale Beck (flowing east from Demmings Moss and Bretherdale Bank) before falling into the River Lune near the head of the Lune Gorge by Castle Howe close to Old Tebay.
