= Lune Millennium Bridge =

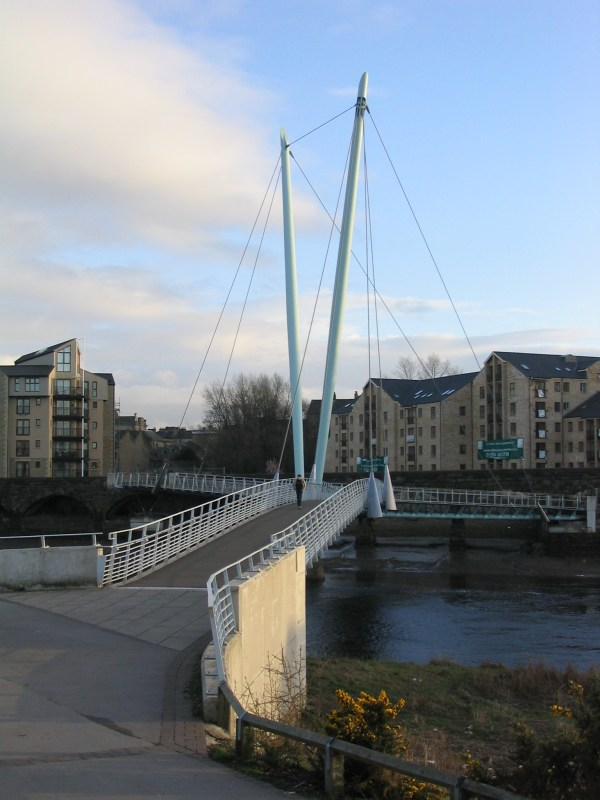
- Coordinates: 54.05250°N 2.80244°W grid reference SD474621
- Carries: Pedestrians & cyclists
- Crosses: River Lune
- Locale: Lancashire, England
- Maintained by: City of Lancaster
- Preceded by: Greyhound Bridge
- Followed by: Carlisle Bridge

Characteristics
- Design: Structural steel cable-stayed bridge
- Total length: 140 metres (460 ft)
- Width: 4 metres (13 ft)
- Height: 40 metres (130 ft)
- Longest span: 64 metres (210 ft)

History
- Opened: February 2001

The Lune Millennium Bridge is a cable-stayed, multi-way footbridge which spans the River Lune in Lancaster, England.

It was designed by Whitby Bird and Partners, and built at a cost of £1.8m to commemorate the millennium of 2000. The bridge forms a "Y"-shape in plan to connect one bank both to a viaduct and adjacent quay. Its double pylon seeks to act as a reminder of the masted ships which previously used the quay. It features a main gangway of just over 30 metres and masts around 40 metres tall.

The bridge is part of the National Cycle Network and connects multiple local cyclepaths together, including the one to Morecambe, the one to Caton and the one to Glasson Dock. It's part of route 6 and its design received the Sustrans National Cycle Network Award for Excellence in 2005, and was commended in the Civic Trust Awards in 2003.

Its location is culturally significant as the near-approximate site of the historic Old Loyne Bridge.

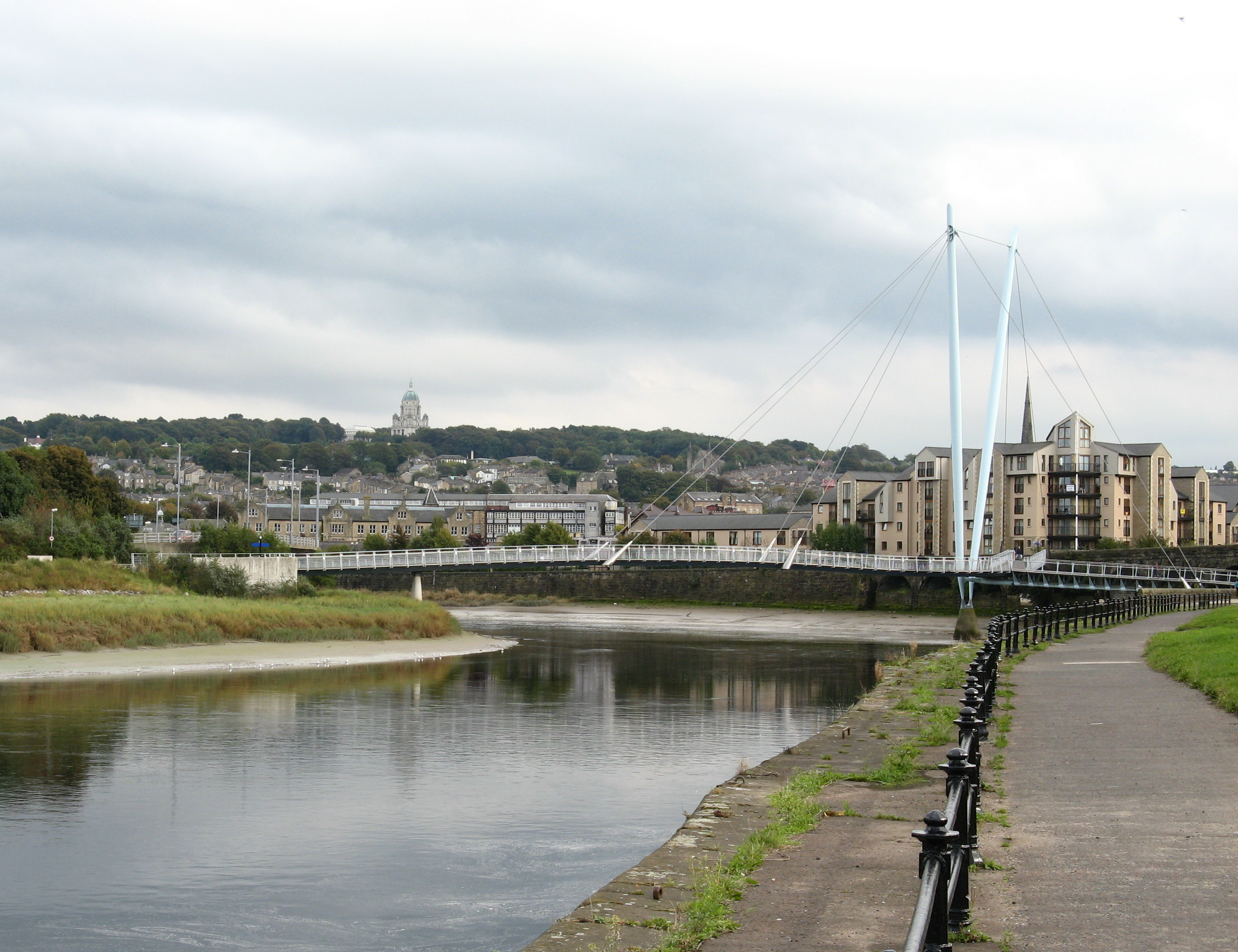
West side of bridge, with Ashton Memorial on skyline

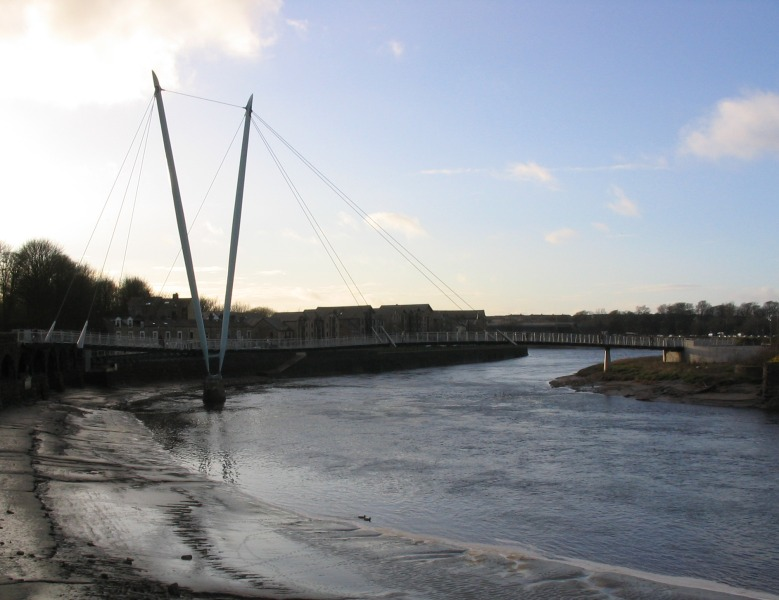
East side of bridge

View at sunset taken from the south bank

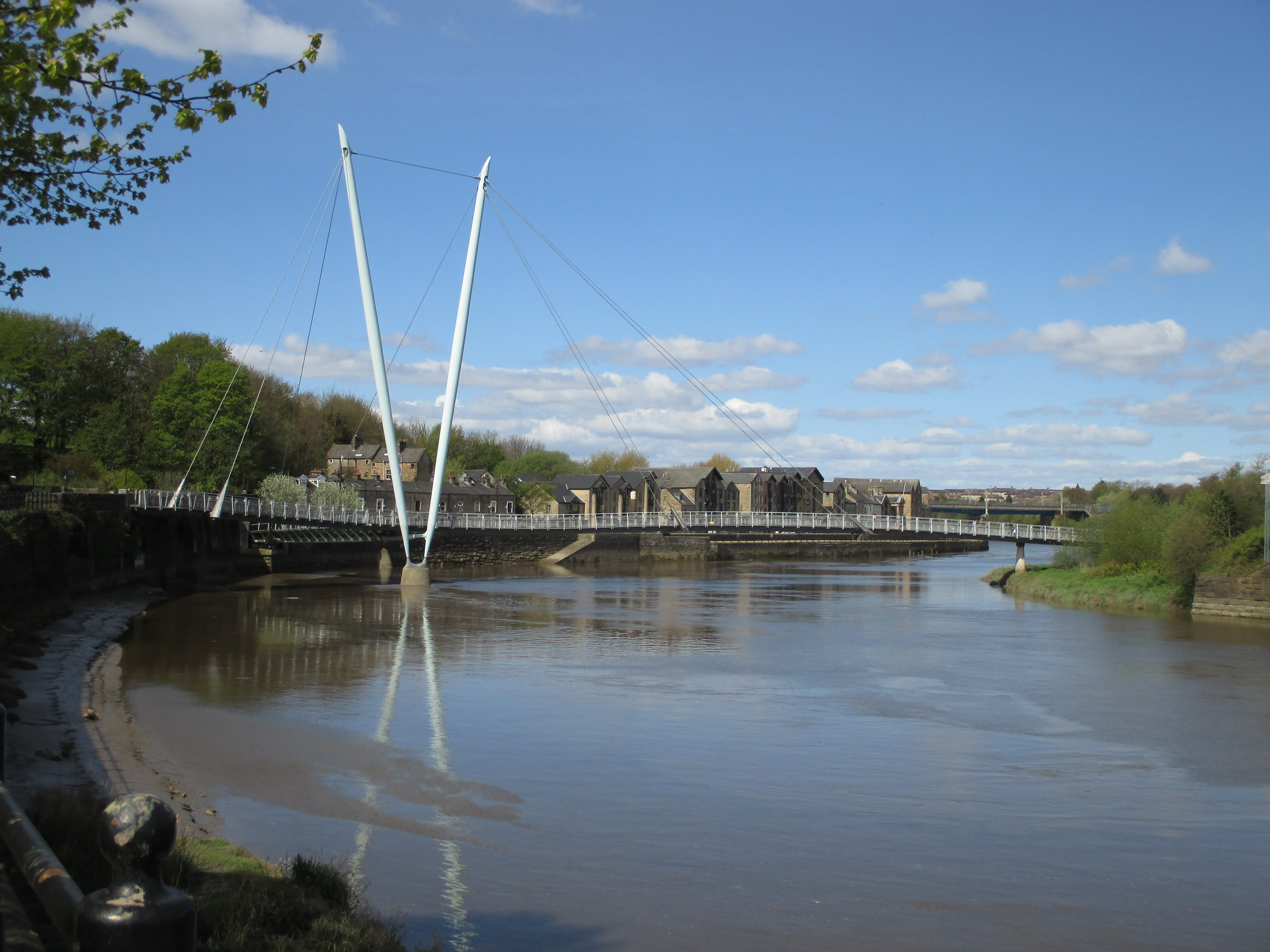
Seen from the east
