= River Lune =

River in Cumbria and Lancashire, England

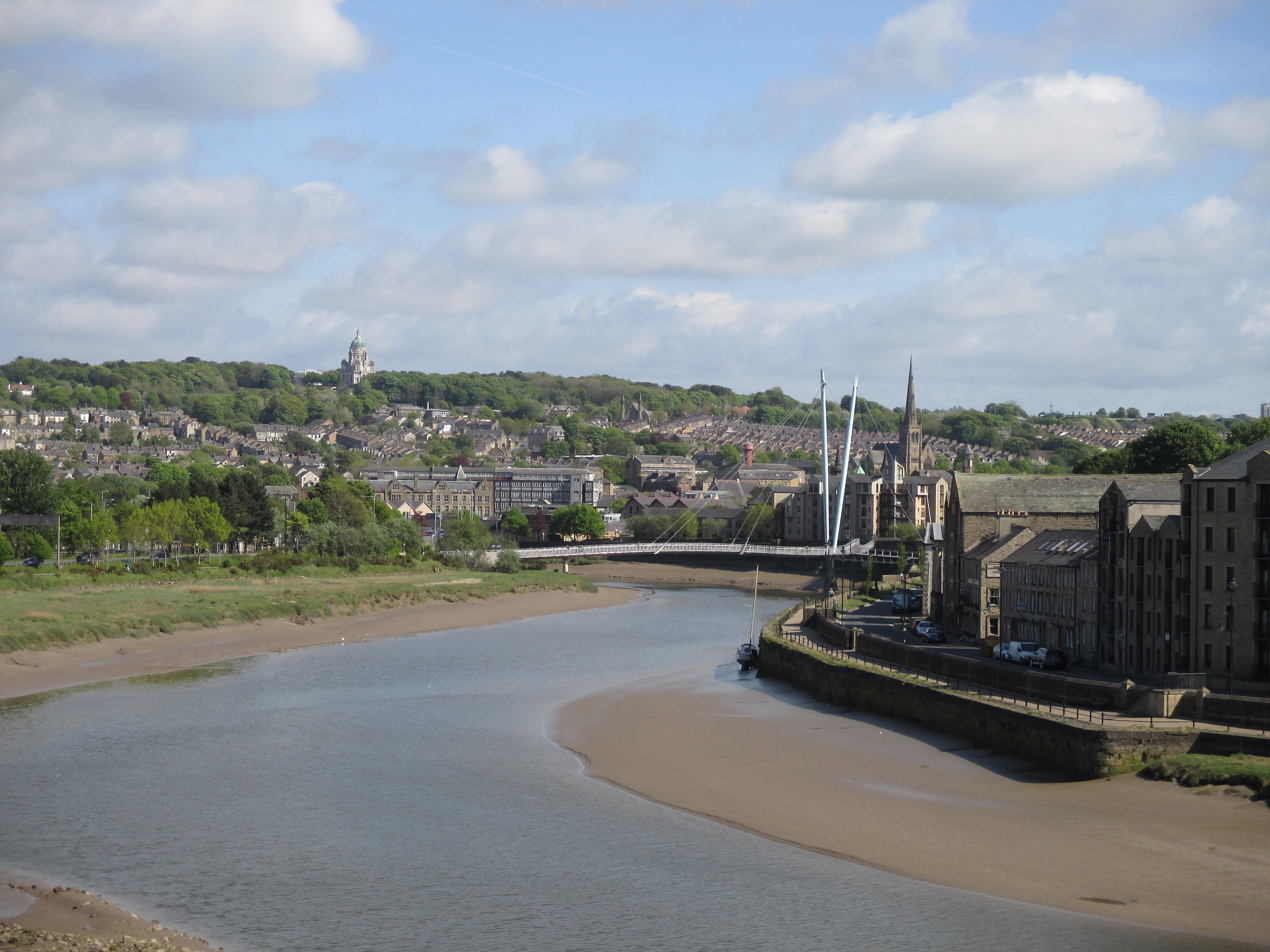
- The River Lune, Lancaster

Location
- Country: England
- Counties: Cumbria, Lancashire

Physical characteristics
- Source
  - location: Newbiggin-on-Lune, Ravenstonedale, Cumbria
  - elevation: 238 m (781 ft)
- Mouth
  - location: Plover Scar, Lancaster, Lancashire
  - coordinates: 53°59′6″N 2°52′39″W
- Length: 85.6 km (53.2 mi)

The River Lune (archaically sometimes Loyne) is a river 53 miles (85 km) in length in Cumbria and Lancashire, England.

== Etymology ==
Several elucidations for the origin of the name Lune exist. Firstly, it may be that the name is Brittonic in genesis and derived from *lǭn meaning "full, abundant", or "healthy, pure" (cf. Old Irish slán, Welsh llawn). Secondly, Lune may represent Old English Ēa Lōn (ēa = "river") as a phonetic adaptation of a Romano-British name referring to a Romano-British god Ialonus who was worshipped in the area.

== Springs ==
The river begins as a stream at Newbiggin, in the parish of Ravenstonedale, Cumbria, at St. Helen's Well (elevation of 238 metres (781 ft) above sea level) and some neighbouring springs. On the first two miles of its course, it is joined by four streams, two of them as short as itself, but two much longer. These are the Bessy Beck (short), the Dry Beck of 4.9 kilometres' (three miles) length at 0.32 miles (0.51 km) from St. Helen's Well, the Sandwath Beck (short) at 0.37 miles (0.60 km), and the Weasdale Beck (5.58 km = 3½ mls) at 1.6 miles from the well. Weasdale Beck is the uppermost headwater of River Lune recorded in Environment Agency's Catchment Data Explorer.

== Course and valleys ==
It then passes the remnants of a Roman fort near Low Borrowbridge at the foot of Borrowdale, and flows through south Cumbria, meeting the Irish Sea at Plover Scar near Lancaster, after a total journey of about 53 miles (85 km).

The valley of the Lune has three parts. The northern part between its source and Tebay is called Lunesdale. Below this is the spectacular Lune Gorge through which both the M6 motorway and the West Coast Main Railway Line run. Below the gorge, the valley broadens out into Lonsdale.

Bridges over the Lune include the Devil's Bridge near Kirkby Lonsdale and the Lune Millennium Bridge in Lancaster. At Caton, about 5 miles (8 km) upstream from Lancaster, there is a cluster of three bridges (one stone road bridge and two disused iron rail bridges now used as foot/cyclepaths) at the Crook o' Lune. Here in a 180-degree right-hand bend the Lune turns back on itself; this is followed by a 90-degree left-hand bend forming the shape of a shepherd's crook and creating a beauty spot which was painted by J. M. W. Turner. The M6 motorway crosses the Lune near Tebay and Halton-on-Lune; in 2015 it was joined by the Heysham to M6 Link Road. The Ingleton branch line, a railway operational between 1861 and 1967, followed the Lune between Tebay and Kirkby Lonsdale, crossing the river twice on viaducts which still stand.

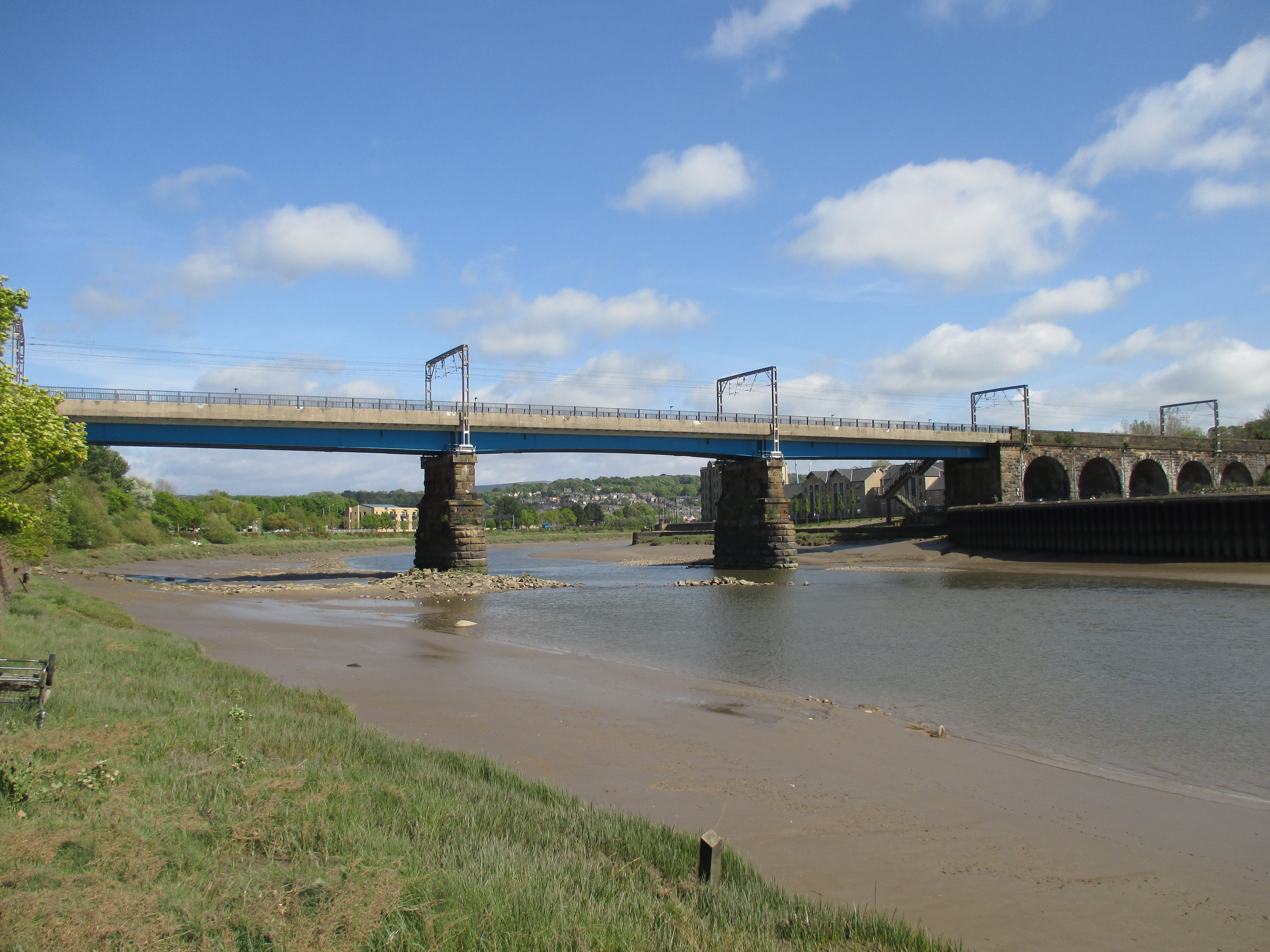
Carlisle Bridge over the Lune at Lancaster

== Estuary ==
The river is a County Biological Heritage Site. Near the end of the non-tidal reach of the river stands the Lune Aqueduct, which carries the Lancaster Canal. The Lune is now tidal only below Skerton Weir in Lancaster. Four bridges in close proximity cross the estuary in Lancaster: Skerton Bridge (road), Greyhound Bridge (built as rail but now carries a road), Lune Millennium Bridge (pedestrian and cycle) and Carlisle Bridge (carrying the West Coast Main Line railway, and with a public walkway on the eastern side) which is the furthest downstream of the bridges.

This part of the Lune is also the site of the old Port of Lancaster, probably a port from Roman times; the Lancaster Port Commission was established in 1750 to improve navigation on the estuary. Between 1750 and 1767, St George's Quay and New Quay were built in Lancaster and in 1779 the port facilities were extended closer to the Irish Sea at Glasson Dock. In 1847 the Commissioners built a pair of lighthouses near Cockersand Abbey to help guide ships into the port. The lower lighthouse, known as the Plover Scar Lighthouse, (sometimes called Abbey lighthouse) still stands on Plover Scar, and it remains operational. The old high light, a square wooden tower, was demolished in 1954; but the former keepers' cottage, built alongside the high light, can still be seen.

Lancaster, in turn Lancashire, is named after the Lune. The dale gave its name to the ancient Lancashire hundred of Lonsdale and the ancient Westmorland ward of Lonsdale.

== In literature ==
An engraving of a picture by J. Henderson entitled 'The Vale of Lonsdale' appears in Fisher's Drawing Room Scrap Book, 1832 together with a poetical illustration by Letitia Elizabeth Landon. The plate shows Ingleborough in the background.

Jane Edmondson Benson's original title for Quaker Pioneers in Russia was "From the Lune to the Neva", i.e. from the Lune river (where her parents, George and Anne Edmondson, came from), to the River Neva, in Saint Petersburg, where she was born as part of the Quaker experiment undertaken by Daniel Wheeler. Wheeler went with 32 Quakers to Saint Petersburg at the request of Emperor Alexander I, in order to drain the marshes so that the then capital of Russia could expand.

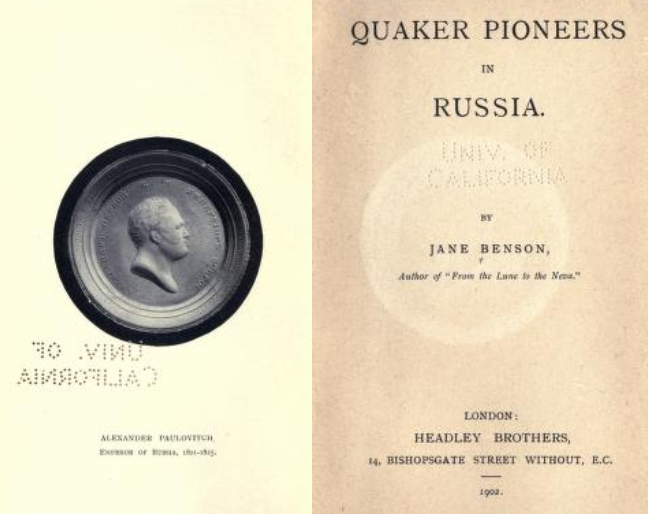
Jane (Edmondson) BENSON,_From the (River) Lune to the (River) Neva (Quaker)

== Gallery ==
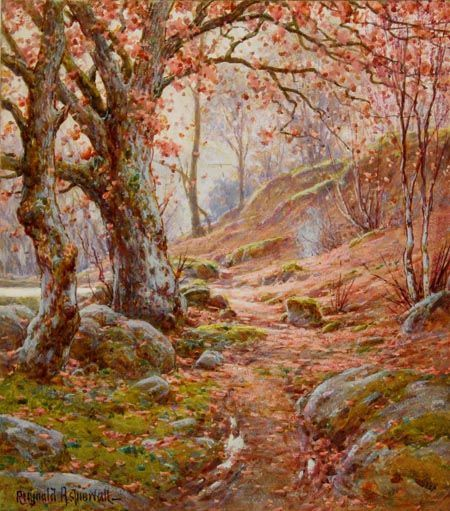
A November Morn in the Lune Valley by Reginald Aspinall

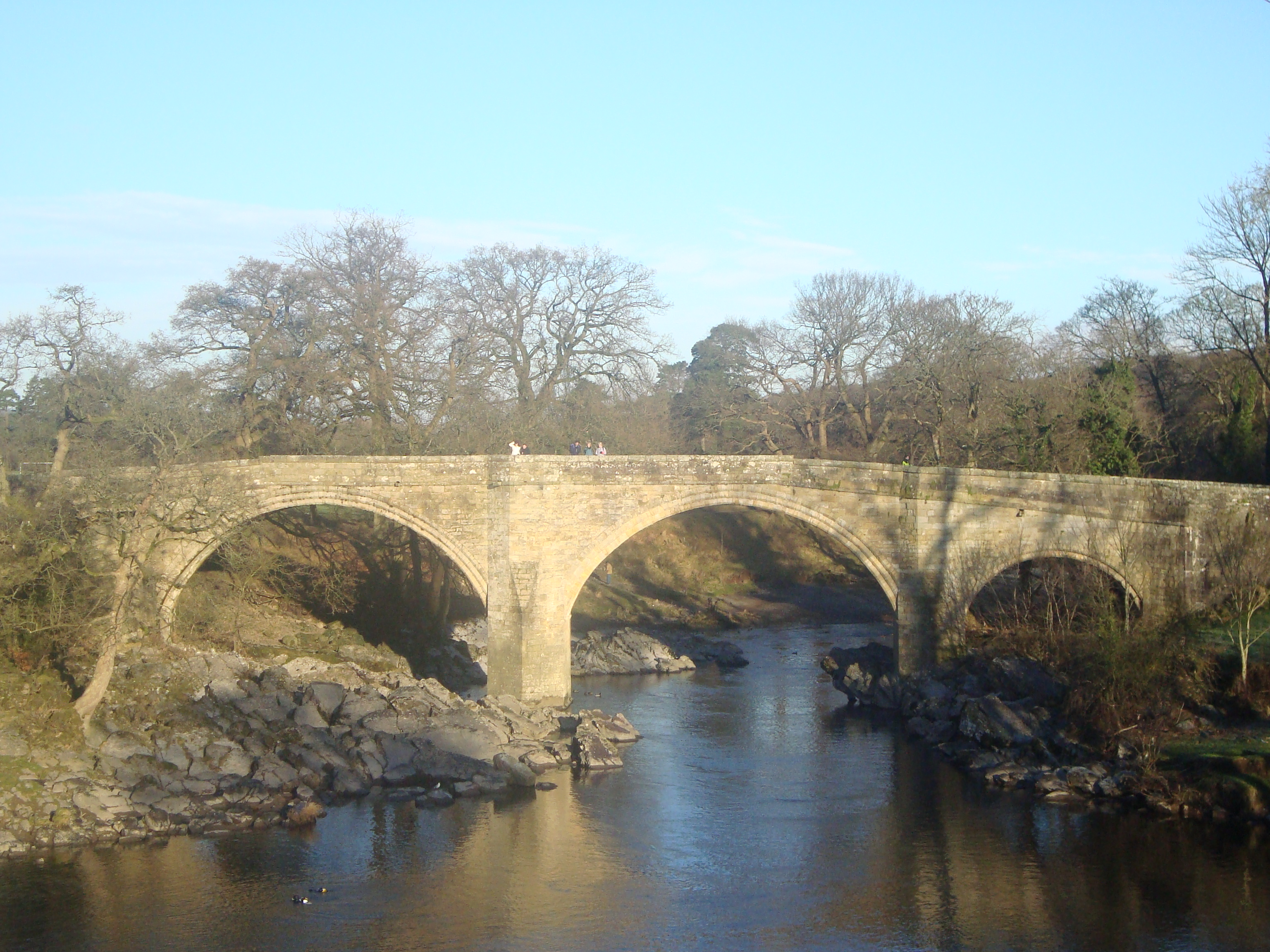
Devil's Bridge over the River Lune in Kirkby Lonsdale

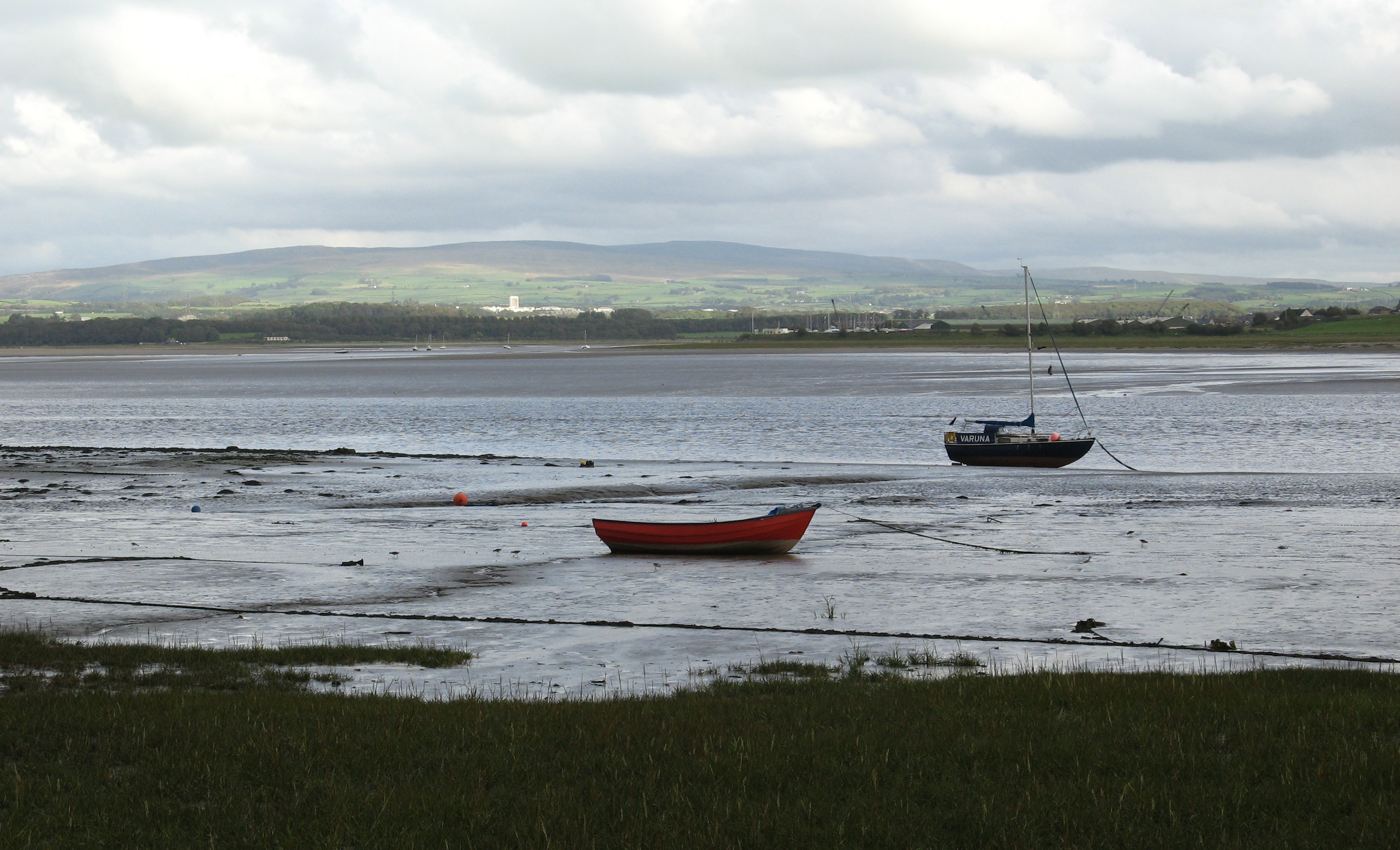
Near the mouth of the Lune, at Sunderland Point

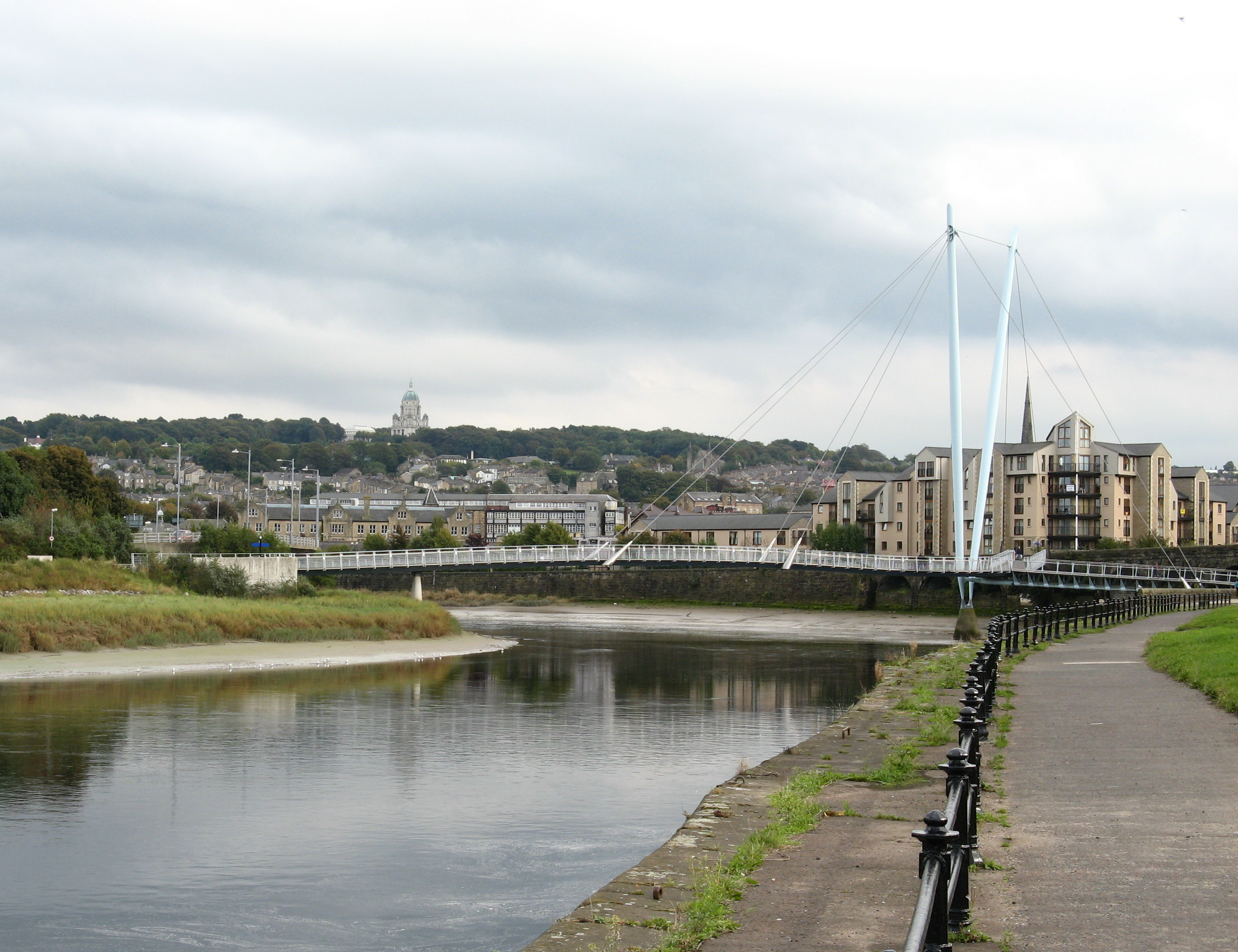
Lune at the Lune Millennium Bridge, with Lancaster in background

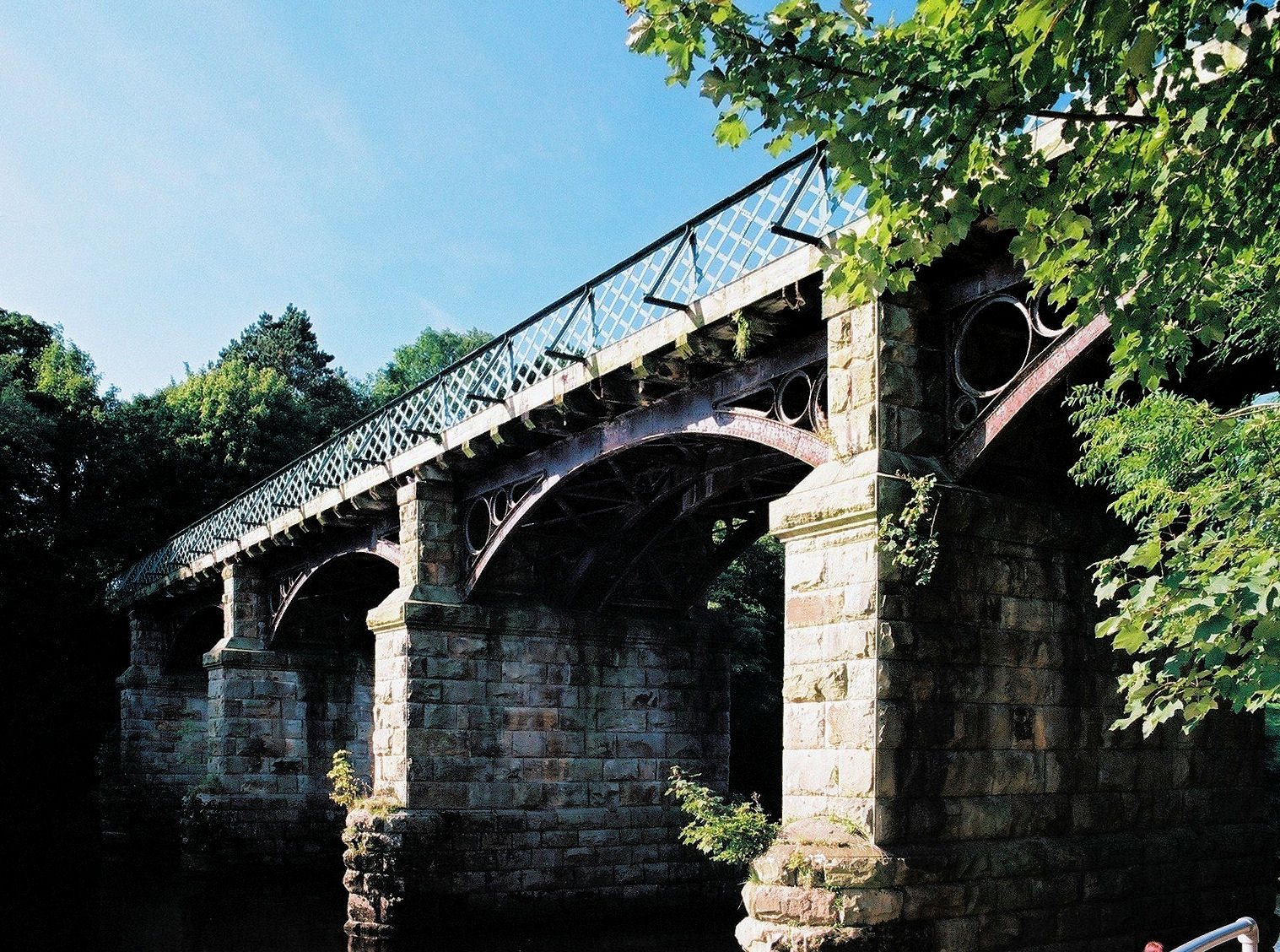
Disused railway bridge at the Crook o' Lune, once part of the "little" North Western Railway, now a cycle path

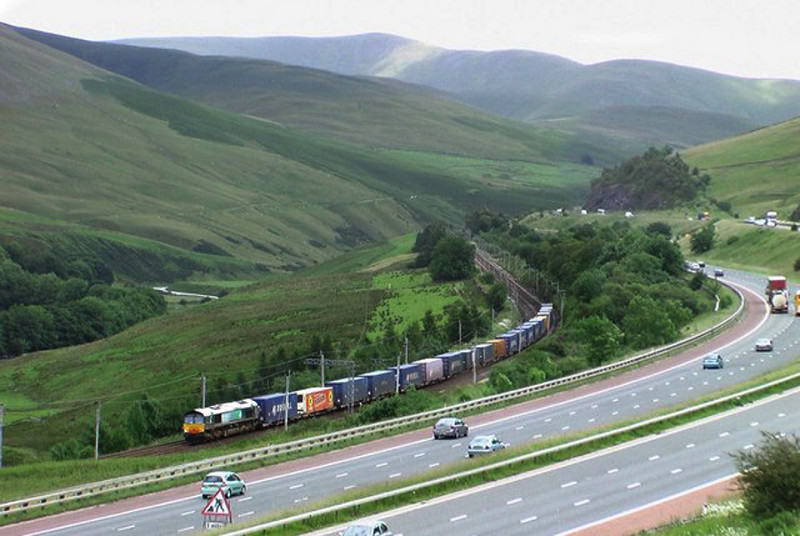
Lune Gorge

== Tributaries ==
- Janson Pool (draining Glasson Marsh near Glasson)
- Wood Bridge Pool (draining Lades Marsh near Sunderland)
- Lades Pool (via Lades Marsh, from Overton)
- Chapel Pool (east of Overton)
- River Conder
- Brant Beck (near Ashton Hall)
- Colloway Pool (opposite Stodday)
- Peggymarsh Pool
- Oxcliffe Pool
- Newton Beck (at Newton in Lancaster)
- Howgill Brook (at Beaumont in Lancaster)
- Cote Beck (just west of Halton)
- Denny Beck (opposite Halton)
- Halton Green Beck
  - Monkley Gill Beck
- Escow Beck (at Crook o'Lune)
  - Deys Beck
- Artle Beck (near Caton)
  - Foxdale Beck
    - Crossgill Beck
    - Ragill Beck
      - Closegill Beck
    - Whitespout Gutter
    - Rushbed Gutter
  - Udale Beck
    - Sweet Beck
    - Bellhill Clough
    - Oval Syke
- Highfield Beck
- Bull Beck (near Brookhouse)
  - Kirk Beck
  - Tarn Brook
    - Traitor's Gill
- Mears Beck
- Westend Beck
  - Barncroft Beck
- Clunter Beck (at Aughton)
- Claughton Beck
  - Farleton Beck
- River Wenning
  - River Hindburn
    - River Roeburn
  - Clapham Beck
    - Fell Beck (sinks into Gaping Gill and
      rises from Ingleborough Cave into Clapham Beck)
- Gressingham Beck (near Gressingham)
  - High Dam Beck
- Spinks Gill Beck
- Thrush Gill (in Thrush Gill Wood)
- Old Lune
- Bains Beck (near Arkholme)
- Newton Beck
- River Greta
  - River Doe
  - River Twiss
    - Kingdale Beck
      - Back Gill
      - Long Gill
- Leck Beck
- Sellet Mill Beck
- Barbon Beck
  - Aygill
    - Hazel Sike
  - Barkin Beck
- Ashdale Gill
- Toss Beck
- Luge Gill
  - Brow Gill
  - Wrestle Gill
- River Rawthey
  - River Dee
  - Clough River
  - Rawthey Gill
- Crosdale Beck
- Chapel Beck
  - Bram Rigg Beck
  - Calf Beck
  - Long Rigg Beck
- Fairmile Beck
- Carlin Gill
- Borrow Beck
  - Crookdale Beck
- Roundthwaite Beck
- Birk Beck
  - Bretherdale Beck
  - Wasdale Beck
- Chapel Beck
- Tebay Gill
- Rais Beck
- Ellergill Beck
- Langdale Beck
  - Churngill Beck
    - Udale Beck
- Cote Beck
- Bowderdale Beck
- Sandwath Beck
  - Greenside Beck
    - Dale Gill
- Weasdale Beck

== Rescue incidents and agencies ==
The River Lune over the years has been subject to many rescue incidents, some fatal. The majority of incidents occur below Skerton Weir in the tidal area, or around the weir itself. HM Coastguard have operational primacy over incidents up to the high water mark, with their nearest team based in Morecambe. Flanking teams at Knott End and Arnside will often assist.

Lancashire Fire and Rescue Service Fire appliance at Lancaster maintains a water rescue service, with specially trained swiftwater rescue personnel. The nearest fire service boat is based at Preston fire station and this is often called to assist the swiftwater rescue personnel in carrying out rescues or providing safety cover for the crews.

In 2018 Lancaster Area Search and Rescue established themselves within the city. Part of the Surf Lifesaving Great Britain (SLSGB) family, their main role is to provide water rescue personnel and resources to flood and other water incidents within the Lancaster district at times when the statutory services require assistance. The team is equipped with rescue sleds and a powered inflatable boat for use on the river.

The RNLI can also be seen on the river fairly regularly, including both the D class and their Hovercraft, The Hurley Flyer. Rather than transit to scene from the Lifeboat station, the RNLI will often drive to the scene, often launching at Snatchems Golden Ball pub.
