= Listed buildings in Roeburndale =

Roeburndale is a civil parish in Lancaster, Lancashire, England. It contains 19 listed buildings that are recorded in the National Heritage List for England. All of the listed buildings are designated at Grade II, the lowest of the three grades, which is applied to "buildings of national importance and special interest". The parish is completely rural, and all the listed buildings are houses, farmhouses and farm buildings.

== Buildings ==
Name and location	Photograph	Date	Notes
Winder Farmhouse and barn 54.06267°N 2.62177°W	—	Early 17th century (probable)	The house and barn are in sandstone with a stone-slate roof and are in two storeys. The house has two separate outshuts on each side. Most of the windows are mullioned, and above the doorway is a decorated and inscribed lintel. The barn to the right is of a later date, and has a wide entrance with a segmental arch.
Eastern farm building, Outhwaite Farm; 54.08540°N 2.59170°W	—	1652	The building originate as a house, and has since been converted for other purposes. It is in sandstone with s stone-slate roof, and has two storeys. The windows are mullioned and some of them have been blocked. The original doorway has been re-set and blocked; it has a moulded surround and an inscribed lintel. Elsewhere are a doorway and pitching holes.
Smeer Hall; 54.08851°N 2.57899°W	—	1654	The house, that was extended in the 18th century, is in sandstone, and has a roof partly of stone-slate and partly of slate. It is in two storey with an attic and has mullioned windows. Inside the house is a bressumer.
Bellhurst Farmhouse and barn 54.08893°N 2.58593°W	—	Late 17th century	A house and barn in sandstone with roofs of slate and stone-slate. The house has two storeys and four bays. Most of the mullions have been removed from the windows, and the doorway has a chamfered surround. Inside the house is a bressumer.
Middle Salter Farmhouse and barn 54.06298°N 2.60794°W	—	Late 17th century	The house and barn are in sandstone and have two storeys. The original part of the house is pebbledashed with a slate roof, and is in two bays. Some of the windows have retained their mullions. To the right is a single-bay extension with sash windows. To the right of this is the barn, with a wide entrance and a pitching hole. Inside the house is a bressumer.
Outhwaite Farmhouse; 54.08493°N 2.59191°W	—	Late 17th century	A pebbledashed stone house with a stone-slate roof, it has two storeys and four bays. The mullions have been removed from the windows. There is a later single-storey porch. Inside the house is a bressumer.
South farm building, Outhwaite Farm; 54.08523°N 2.59214°W	—	Late 17th century	The building was originally two houses with two storeys. They are in sandstone, the west house has a roof of stone-slate, and the east house has a slate roof and a rear wing. The windows are mullioned although some mullions have been removed. The doorway has a moulded surround, and a decorated lintel inscribed with initials and a date that has been changed.
Farm building, Stauvin Farm; 54.07627°N 2.58344°W		1696	The farm building originated as a house, and is in sandstone with a roof partly of slate and partly of stone-slate in two storeys. On the front are doorways and windows some of which have been altered or blocked, and at the rear are windows in both floors.
Stocks and whipping post, Outhwaite Farm; 54.08505°N 2.59208°W	—	c. 1700 (possible)	The stocks and whipping post are in sandstone. The stocks are set into a wall, and consist of two square posts with grooves inside. The lower board contains four semicircular holes for legs; the upper board is missing. The whipping post is chamfered and has an iron ring at the top.
Former farmhouse, Barkin Gate; 54.07828°N 2.60716°W	—	1709	The building was originally a house, later used for other purposes. It is in sandstone with a stone-slate roof, and is in two storeys with three bays. The windows are mullioned, and the doorway has a moulded surround and an inscribed battlemented lintel.
Lower Haylot Farmhouse; 54.05496°N 2.61528°W	—	1724	A sandstone house, with a roof of slate at the front and stone-slate at the rear. It has two storeys and three bays, and the windows are mullioned. In the centre is a single-storey gabled porch, and has a doorway with a moulded surround and an inscribed battlemented lintel.
Farm building, Scale Farm; 54.08154°N 2.57688°W	—	Mid 18th century	The building originated as a house and a barn in sandstone with a stone-slate roof, and is in two storeys. The house has mullioned windows and two doors. In the barn is a wide entrance, a shippon door, windows, and a pitching hole, and it has a lean-to extension.
Leyland Farmhouse; 54.08480°N 2.57097°W	—	1756	The house is in sandstone with a stone-slate roof, in two storeys and two bays. The windows are mullioned, and the doorway has a moulded surround. On the right gable wall is a 20th-century porch with a re-set inscribed plaque.
North barn, Outhwaite Farm; 54.08541°N 2.59220°W	—	1761	The barn is in sandstone with a stone-slate roof. On the south front are a window set in a blocked threshing door, a pitching hole, a doorway with an inscribed plaque above, and a wide doorway. The north front has lean-to extensions, and a blocked wide entrance with a segmental arch now containing a door and window.
Harterbeck Farmhouse and store 54.06713°N 2.59454°W	—	Mid to late 18th century	Originally two houses, the building is in sandstone. with the front of the roof in slate and the back in stone-slate. Each part has two bays, mullioned windows, and a doorway. At the rear are two stair windows. On the front of the house is a porch with a flat flagstone top.
Mallowdale Farmhouse and farm building 54.05225°N 2.60752°W	—	Late 18th century	The house and farm building are in sandstone with a stone-slate roof. The house has two storeys and two bays, and the windows are mullioned. There are porches on both front and back fronts, that on the back has a re-used 17th-century doorway with a triangular head. The farm building has a wide doorway.
West farm building, Outhwaite Farm; 54.08530°N 2.59248°W	—	Late 18th century (possible)	A sandstone building with a stone-slate roof, in two builds. Both parts have doorways with long-and-short jambs and pitching holes. The newer part, on the right, also has pigeon holes.
North western barn, Outhwaite Farm; 54.08546°N 2.59250°W	—	c. 1800	The barn is in sandstone with a stone-slate roof. On the western front are two wide entrances, one with a canopy, and a shippon door. In the east front are a projecting shippon with a doorway, a threshing door, above which is a re-set inscribed plaque, and a pitching hole.
Western barn, Outhwaite Farm; 54.08516°N 2.59262°W	—	c. 1800	A sandstone barn with a stone-slate roof, it has a projecting shippon on the left and a lean-to shippon on the right. Between the shippons is a wide entrance with a segmental arch, and at the rear is a threshing door, now blocked and containing a window. There are doors in both shippons.
