= Carlisle Bridge, Lancaster =

Carlisle Bridge
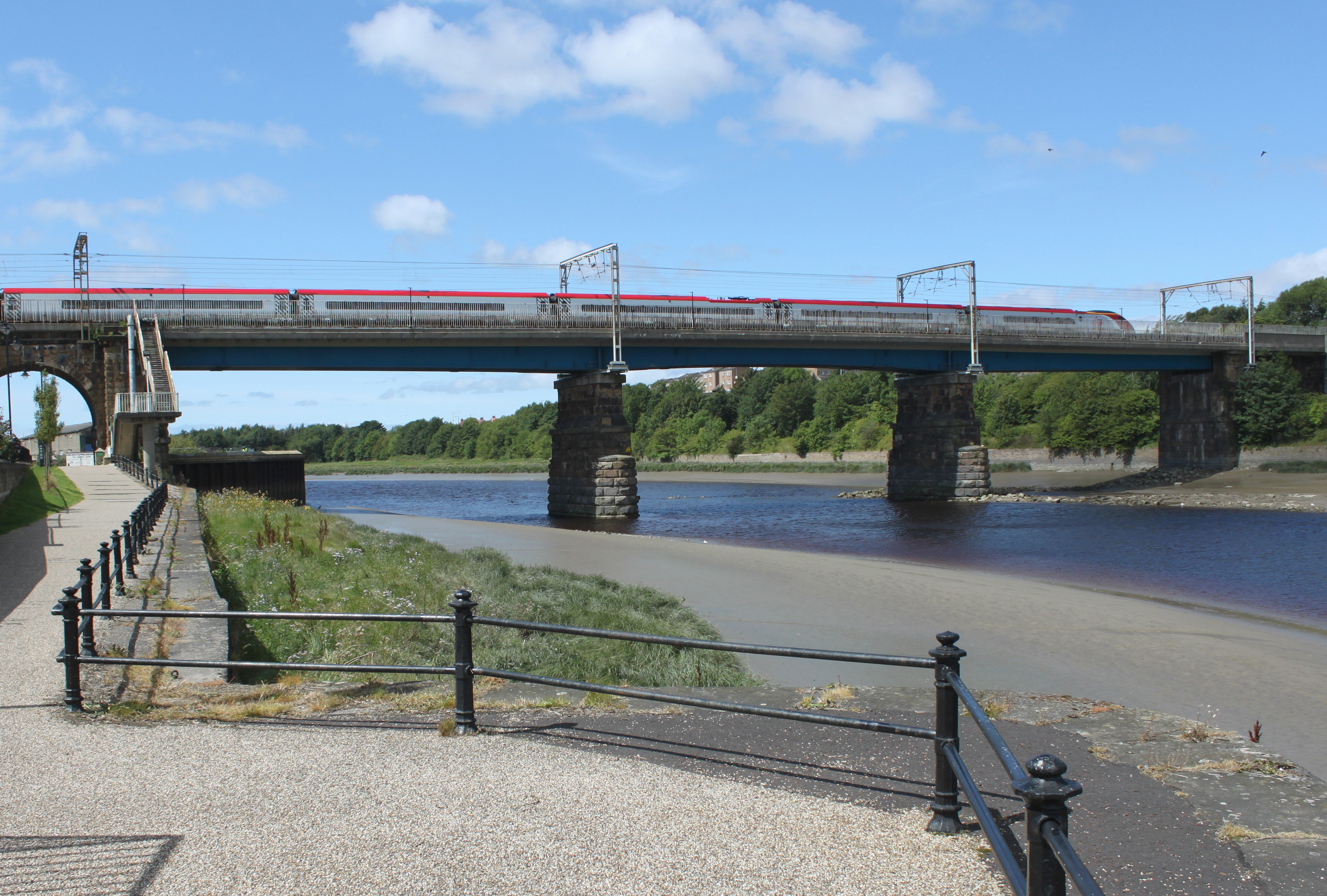
- Coordinates: 54.0551°N 2.8087°W
- Carries: West Coast Main Line & pedestrians
- Crosses: River Lune & A589
- Locale: Lancaster, Lancashire, England
- Other name: Lune Bridge
- Preceded by: Lune Millennium Bridge

Characteristics
- Total length: 360 feet (110 m)
- Longest span: 120 feet (37 m)
- No. of spans: 3
- Piers in water: 2

Rail characteristics
- No. of tracks: 2

History
- Constructed by: Thomas Brassey, William Mackenzie, John Stephenson
- Construction start: 1844
- Construction end: 1846
- Opened: 1847
- Rebuilt: 1962–1963

Location
- Interactive map of Carlisle Bridge

The Carlisle Bridge is a railway bridge over the River Lune in Lancaster, north-west England. It carries the West Coast Main Line over three 120-foot (37 m) spans. This section of the railway, including the original version of the bridge, was the work of Thomas Brassey, William Mackenzie, and John Stephenson; it was built between 1844 and 1846 and opened in 1847. There is a walkway for public use attached to the east side of the bridge.

== History and description ==
The viaduct was first built in 1846. The section of line was designed by Joseph Locke and John Edward Errington for the Lancaster and Carlisle Railway. The contractors for Carlisle Bridge were a syndicate of Thomas Brassey, William Mackenzie, and John Stephenson. The spans were originally built from laminated timber beams. These were replaced with wrought iron plate girders in 1866 which were in turn replaced with steel and reinforced concrete beams in 1963. The original piers were preserved through both replacements, including the iron shoes for the original timber arches. On the east side is a footbridge, which forms part of the Lancashire Coastal Way. The arches have a 120-foot (37-metre) span each and are 53 feet (16 metres) high and approached by seven masonry arches on the south bank and another arch on the north side.

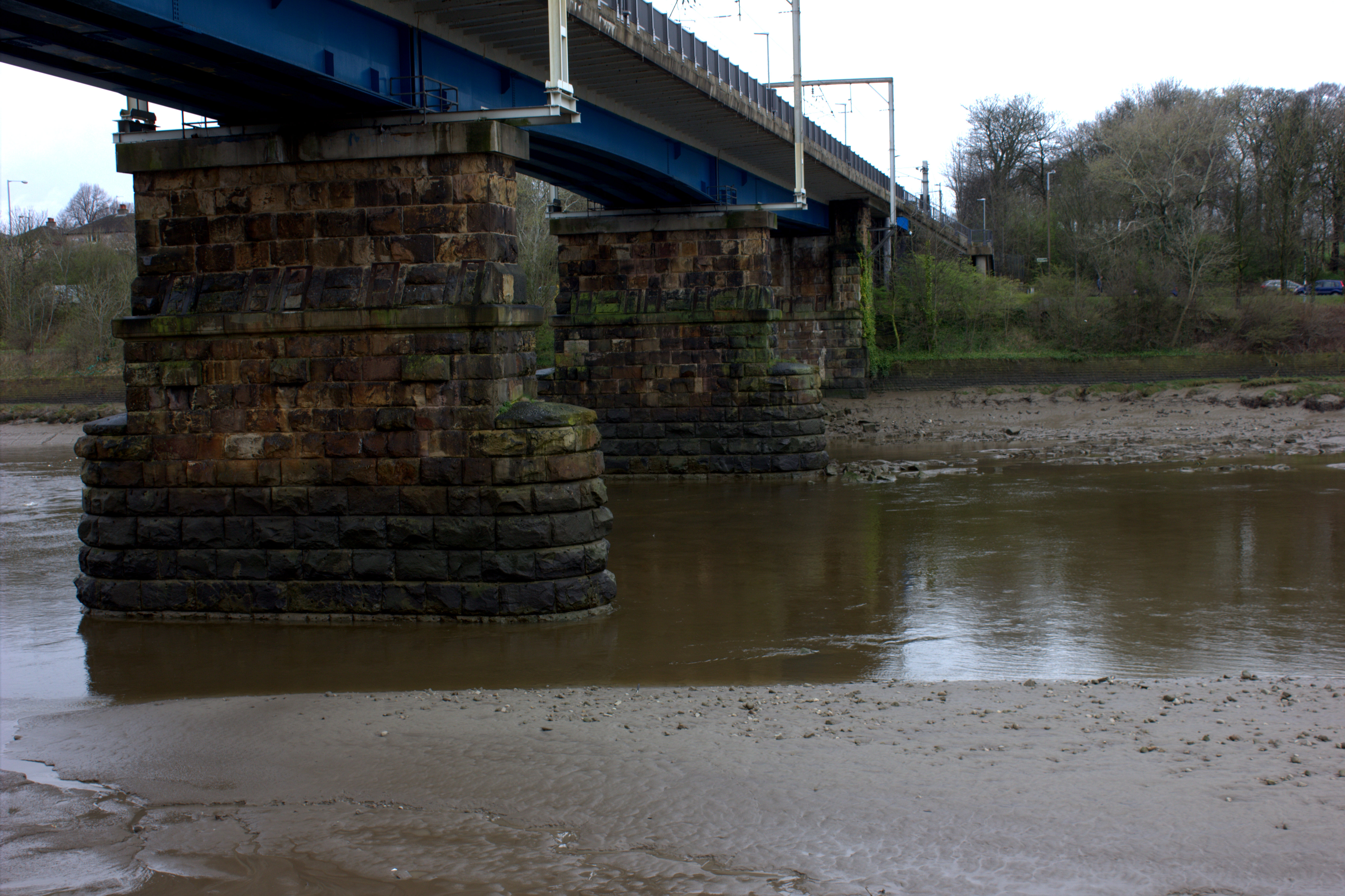
The original abutments, now supporting 1960s spans

When surveying a route for a railway through Lancashire and into Scotland, the engineer George Stephenson initially favoured a more westerly route via Morecambe and the Cumbrian coast but Locke convinced him to take a more inland route, requiring a bridge over the Lune at Lancaster. The railway company was required to handsomely compensate the Lancaster Port Commission for the disruption caused by the piers in the river. The bridge is now part of the West Coast Main Line from London to Glasgow. The rebuilding in the 1960s was part of British Rail's modernisation programme. The line was electrified at the same time and masts for overhead line equipment were added to the bridge.
