= Greyhound Bridge =

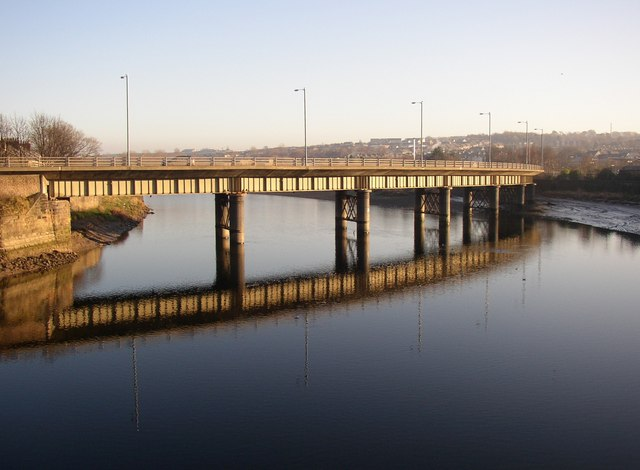
- Coordinates: 54.0523°N 2.8002°W
- Carries: A6 road (northbound lanes)
- Crosses: River Lune
- Locale: Lancaster, Lancashire
- Preceded by: Skerton Bridge
- Followed by: Lune Millennium Bridge

History
- Opened: 1911

The Greyhound Bridge is a road-connection spanning the River Lune as it runs through Lancaster, England. It serves as the primary route northwards, on account of a one-way system that directs all southbound traffic over Skerton Bridge. Originally built to carry a railway, it is the third bridge to stand on the present site and lies between the Lune Millennium Bridge and Skerton Bridge.

== History ==
The first bridge on the site was constructed out of laminated timber in 1848 to carry the Morecambe Harbour and Railway Company's new railway, linking the adjoining Lancaster Green Ayre railway station to Morecambe Harbour. That was replaced by a wrought iron viaduct during 1862–64, and by the third and current bridge in 1911. Material salvaged from the demolition of the second bridge was used in the 1913 reconstruction of what is now the "Halton Narrow Toll Bridge", further up the River Lune, on the same railway line.

After the closure of the railway in 1966, the Greyhound Bridge was converted for use by road traffic and re-opened in 1972.

== Significance ==
The structure is notable for its westward curve, onto the northern bank of the River Lune; a feature that has been prominent on the landscape, since at least the wrought-iron second incarnation of the bridge, completed in 1864.

With overhead electrification of the Lancaster–Morecambe Line in 1908, it is very possible that the Greyhound Bridge may have been the first bridge in the United Kingdom to carry electrified rolling stock, owing to it being the only bridge on that section of line.

== Closure ==
Lancashire County Council have stated that the bridge requires substantial maintenance in order to avoid a weight limit being placed on it. These works are anticipated to cost £3.7 million and are expected to result in the bridge being closed for 23 weeks between January and August 2018. During this time the nearby Skerton Bridge will be adapted to carry vehicles in two directions. These changes have been criticised by local bus users who feel that the removal of two sections of bus priority lanes will increase journey times across the river. However, without these works, buses would not have been able to use the Greyhound bridge from 2019 due to the proposed weight restriction.
