= Wray-with-Botton =

Civil parish in Lancashire, England

Coordinates: 54.103°N 2.609°W

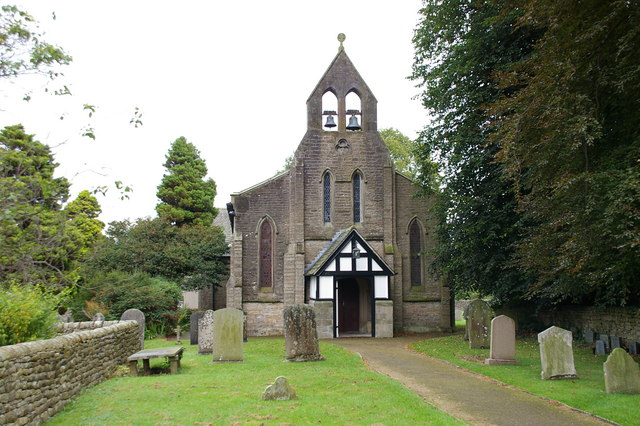
- Holy Trinity Church

- Location in the City of Lancaster district Location in the Forest of Bowland Location within Lancashire
- Area: 8.65 km^{2} (3.34 sq mi)
- Population: 532 (Parish, 2011)
  - Density: 62/km^{2} (160/sq mi)
- OS grid reference: SD6067
- Civil parish: Wray-with-Botton
- District: Lancaster
- Shire county: Lancashire
- Region: North West
- Country: England
- Sovereign state: United Kingdom
- Post town: LANCASTER
- Postcode district: LA2
- Dialling code: 015242
- Police: Lancashire
- Fire: Lancashire
- Ambulance: North West
- UK Parliament: Morecambe and Lunesdale

Wray-with-Botton is a civil parish in the City of Lancaster district and the English county of Lancashire. In 2001 it had a population of 521, increasing to 532 at the Census 2011. The parish includes the village of Wray. Wray is the home of the annual scarecrow festival on the first Monday in May every year.

== See also ==
- Listed buildings in Wray-with-Botton
- Holy Trinity Church, Wray
