= Twicket =

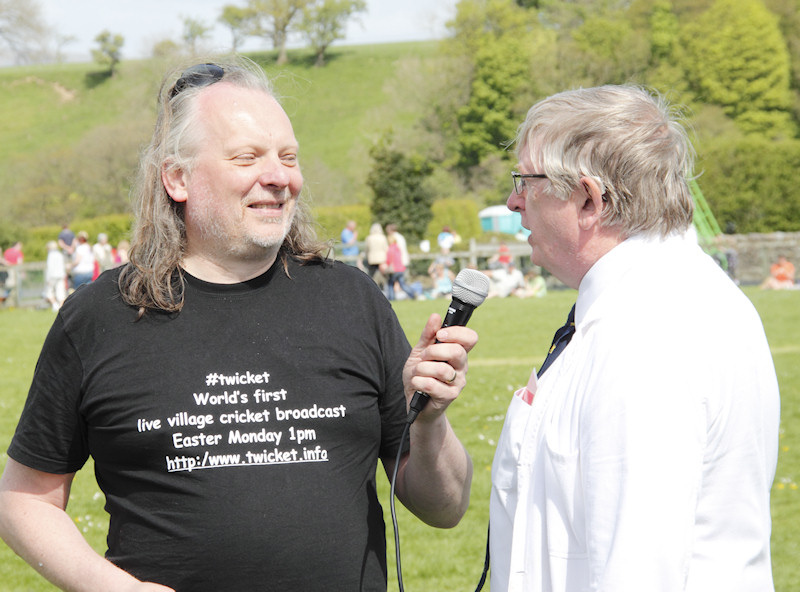
- John Popham interviews the umpire, John Marshall.
- Date: 25 April 2011
- Location: Wray, Lancashire, England; 54.10319°N 2.60761°W
- Also known as: Wray vs. the Rest of the World
- Filmed by: Aquila TV
- Outcome: Wray beat Rest of World
- Website: www.twicket.info

Twicket (a portmanteau of Twitter and Cricket) was a village cricket match, streamed online on 25 April 2011, with the intention of highlighting the need for fast rural broadband. The organisers claimed the event to be a world first. The event received widespread media coverage from several news outlets including BBC Radio London, talkSPORT, and Radio New Zealand.

== Background ==
The event was conceived by consultant John Popham after seeing two comments on Twitter; in the first Dan Slee expressed his hopes for keeping up with a local village cricket team via Twitter. Then, Chris Conder (@cyberdoyle) mentioned that she was testing a new 30 Mbps, symmetrical internet connection, recently installed by Lancaster University in her village, Wray, in Lancashire, England, one of only three villages in the UK to have a symmetrical community network.

On learning from Conder that Wray was to hold a special cricket match part of the village's annual Scarecrow Festival, billed as Wray vs. the Rest of the World, Popham decided to broadcast it to the world to demonstrate the potential of high-speed synchronous broadband. He explained:

I'm confident we can do this, because the village Wi-Fi has a 30 Mbit/s upload speed ... It's a bit of fun, but it has a serious purpose too. The serious side is to demonstrate that it can be done, it is possible to live broadcast events like this using relatively cheap equipment and a good internet connection. It will also demonstrate the importance of good internet connectivity in rural areas, and the need for fast upload connections if we are to realise the aspiration to use the internet to enable more people to produce their own content.

In a retrospective blog post, he explained:

the point is that putting the cricket match up front made people turn their heads in my direction and I then had a platform from which to make some serious points about countryside connectivity

== The match ==
The match was 20 overs per side (the Twenty20 format), with any batsman reaching 20 runs required to retire. Wray won the toss, and elected to bowl first. After 20 overs, The Rest of the World were 69 for 5, leaving Wray needing 70 runs off 20 overs, which they achieved with a final six, in their eleventh over, winning by 8 wickets.

The post-match tug o'war contest (won by Rest of World, 2 out of 3) was also streamed live, as were interviews with various participants.

== Media ==
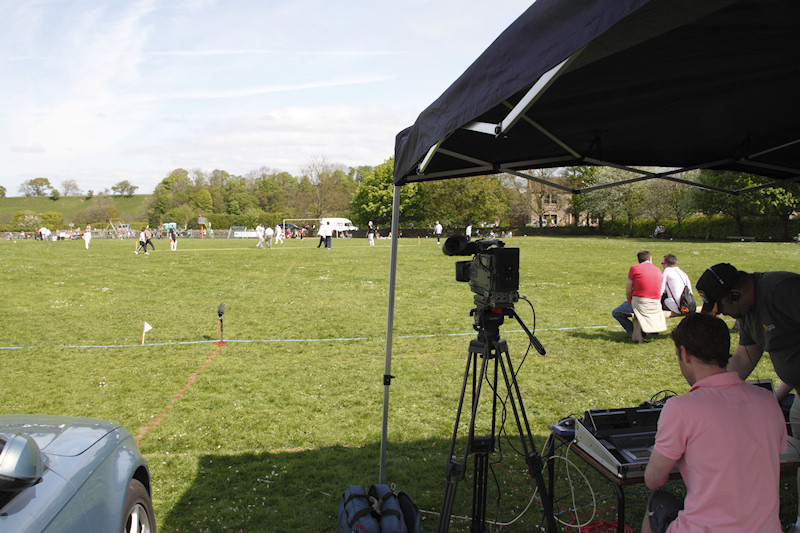
One of the three cameras, plus crew. Note microphone on boundary-line, with red lead.

The event was streamed online on Bambuser with technical support from Birmingham company Aquila TV who used two Sony Z1 cameras and a DSR 350. The stream was watched by a peak of 2,733 viewers. A separate audio commentary was broadcast on-line, by Radio Youthology, attracting 1,780 listeners; their highest figure ever.

Also attending were a BBC North West television news crew, whose film was broadcast the same evening.

The related hashtag #twicket was trending on Twitter shortly before the end of the match. The match also made a star out of local commenter, Brenda, who drank Pimm's throughout the game.
