= The Middlewood Trust =

Permaculture research organisation in Lancashire, England

The Middlewood Trust is an organisation located in Roeburndale, Lancashire, England. It advances research and provides education on permaculture techniques for agriculture, forestry, wildlife and countryside management.

== History ==
The Middlewood Trust has been staffed by volunteers for the past thirty years and volunteering remains an important part of what they do today.

== Present day ==
=== Volunteering ===
The current volunteer programme is focused on the permaculture vegetable garden. The center runs monthly volunteer events that have included projects such as building a new wind turbine battery shed, planting trees, coppicing, and traditional baking. Regular volunteer events take place on the second weekend of every month from January to November.

=== Teaching ===
The Middlewood Trust hosts annual permaculture courses, including introductory short courses and a full Permaculture Design Certificate course. They also accommodate students working towards their Duke of Edinburgh Award. The centre has hosted art trips and workshops.

The site has access to extensive woodlands including Roeburndale Woods (Grade 1 Site of Special Scientific Interest) and many smaller Biological Heritage sites. Historically they were managed as coppice with standards and used for charcoal, wood turning, swill oak baskets, Lancashire clogs from alder, besom birch brushes, fence posts and riven oak beams. They contain many native species of trees including the rare small leaved lime. The woods are used for teaching the National Vegetation Classification and Permaculture courses.

=== Artists in residence ===
The Middlewood Trust uses timber and small wood products from the woods to develop local sustainable crafts.

In recent years, they have had resident bodgers, swillers (oak basket makers), yurt makers, and some charcoal production.

=== Other work ===
The centre was one of several organisations involved with the Lancashire Apples Project, which started in 2005.
