= Village cricket =

Sport played in rural villages of Great Britain

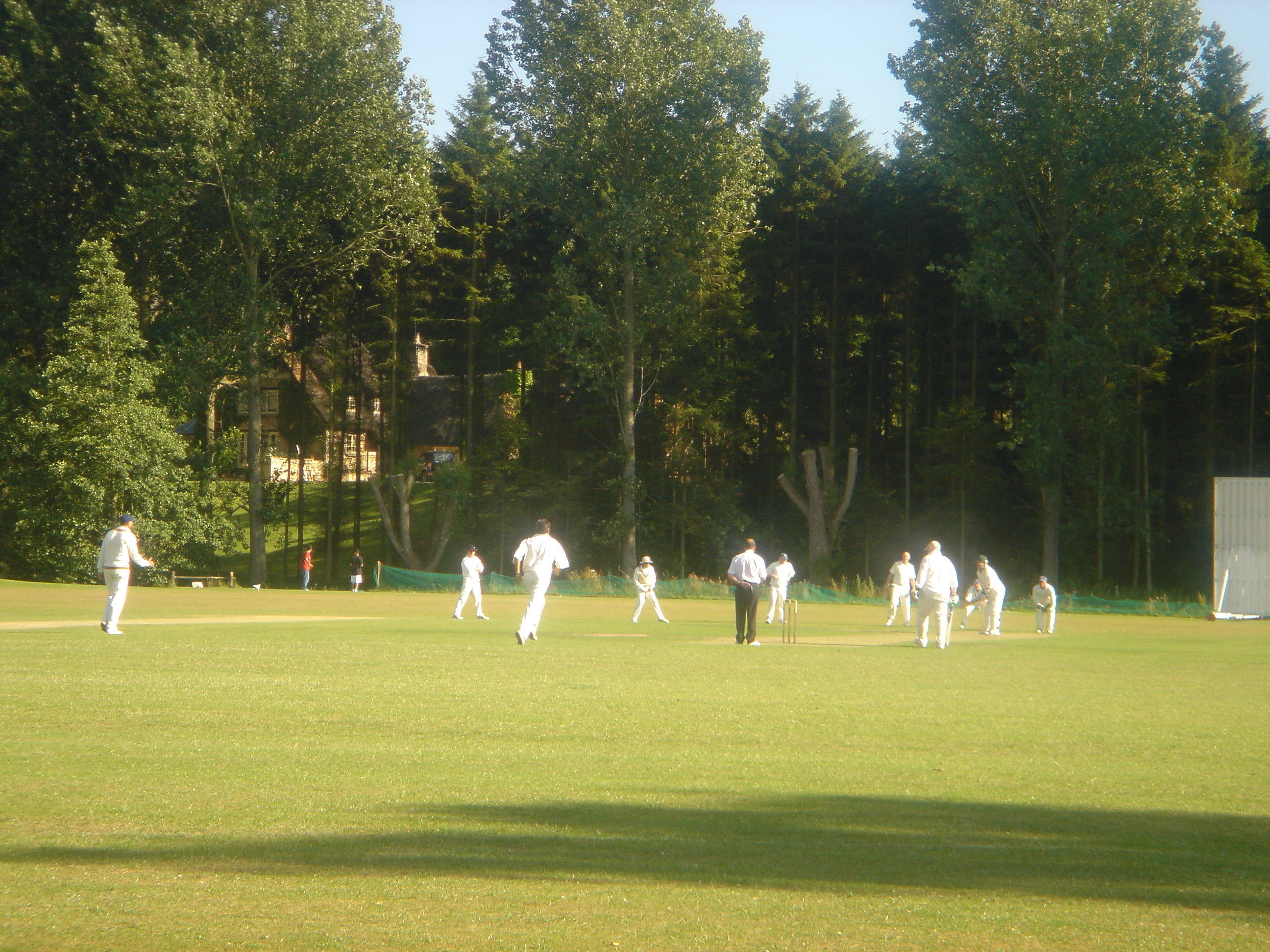
A typical summer scene of village cricket

Village cricket is a term, sometimes pejorative, given to the playing of cricket in rural villages in Britain. Many villages have their own teams that play at varying levels in local or regional club cricket leagues.

== Concept ==
When organised cricket first began in the 17th century, matches were played between rival parishes or villages and this form of competition endured. In representative cricket a team includes players from multiple parishes, for instance one that represents a county or a country.

Village cricket teams may be made up of local residents only, although other first XI can include players with connections to minor counties cricket clubs, and members of the academies of the county cricket club of the county in which the team lies.

Cricket in this form might be played on a village green or other public space instead of a dedicated ground.

== As an adjective ==
In some non-professional cricket leagues, the adjective "village" is a descriptor used humorously, self-deprecatingly, or, sometimes, pejoratively to convey a sense of amateurishness of some aspect of the players' preparation, dress, conduct or play.

== Village Cup ==
The annual National Village Cup competition began in 1972 and each year's competition is covered in detail (particularly the final) in the following Wisden Cricketers' Almanack. The Cricketer magazine is responsible for organising the competition.

It is open to teams from English, Scottish or Welsh villages with a population up to originally 2,500 but as of 2019, 10,000. The final is played at Lord's Cricket Ground in London.

== In popular media ==
- A "House vs. Village" cricket game plays an important role in The Go-Between (1953) by L. P. Hartley, set in the year 1900.
- The Midsomer Murders episode "Dead Man's Eleven" has a sub-plot about two village teams playing against each other.
- Outside Edge, a 1979 play by Richard Harris about a village cricket team; two TV adaptations were made.
- "When an Old Cricketer Leaves the Crease" is a 1975 song by Roy Harper that captures the atmosphere of a village cricket match.
- The BBC radio drama series The Archers follows the lives of characters in the fictional village of Ambridge. Life in summer includes village cricket, especially matches against the rival village of Darrington. Ambridge players include both men and women. The village also has an annual single wicket competition.

== See also ==
- List of English and Welsh cricket league clubs
- Cricket in England
- Cricket in Scotland
- Cricket in Wales
- Twicket
