= Pontage =

Toll levied for the building or repair of bridges

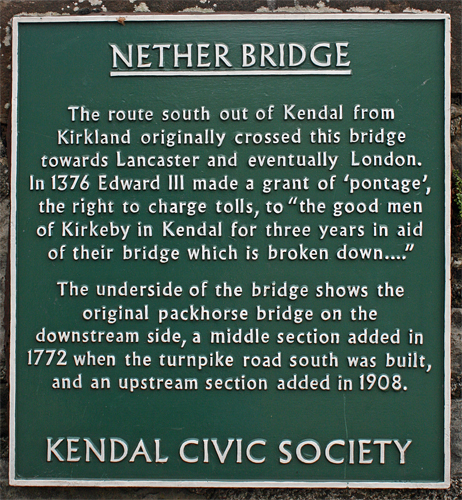
Sign on Nether Bridge, Kendal, noting that it was paid for by a 1376 grant of pontage by Edward III.

Pontage was a toll levied for the building or repair of bridges dating to the medieval era in England, Wales and Ireland.

Pontage was similar in nature to murage (a toll for the building of town walls) and pavage (a toll for paving streets and market places, or—more rarely—roads between towns).

The erection and maintenance of bridges has at all times been a great source of anxiety. Item 23 of Magna Carta states that "No village or individual shall be compelled to make bridges at river banks except those who from old were legally bound to do so." This presumably also covered the questions of repair and many inquisitions were taken in medieval times to settle who should do the work. A very common verdict was that "No one is responsible for the repair of this bridge". In the absence of legal obligations, this duty fell to the Crown from then on. As a consequence "grants of pontage" or licences to collect tolls for a limited period were frequently issued by the king to those appointed or permitted to bear the cost of maintenance.

Pontage was granted by the king by letters patent for a limited term, sufficient to enable the requisite public works to be done. An example would be the grant of pontage for five years in 1291 to Edmund Crouchback for repair of the Old Loyne Bridge at Lancaster, Lancashire. However, sometimes the works were not completed (or at least not paid for) by the end of the term, so that a renewal had to be obtained. Grants were made from 1228 until the 1440s, the earliest being for Ferry Bridge, Brotherton, in Yorkshire, and Staines Bridge, an important crossing of the river Thames. In all about 370 grants were made. In the Lordship of Ireland, grants of pontage were used to build bridges in many towns, including Clonmel, Kilcullen and Leighlinbridge.

The term pontage is also applied to lands in Cambridgeshire, which were liable to repair the bridge of Cambridge as an incident of tenure.
