= Pavage =

Medieval toll payment for road maintenance

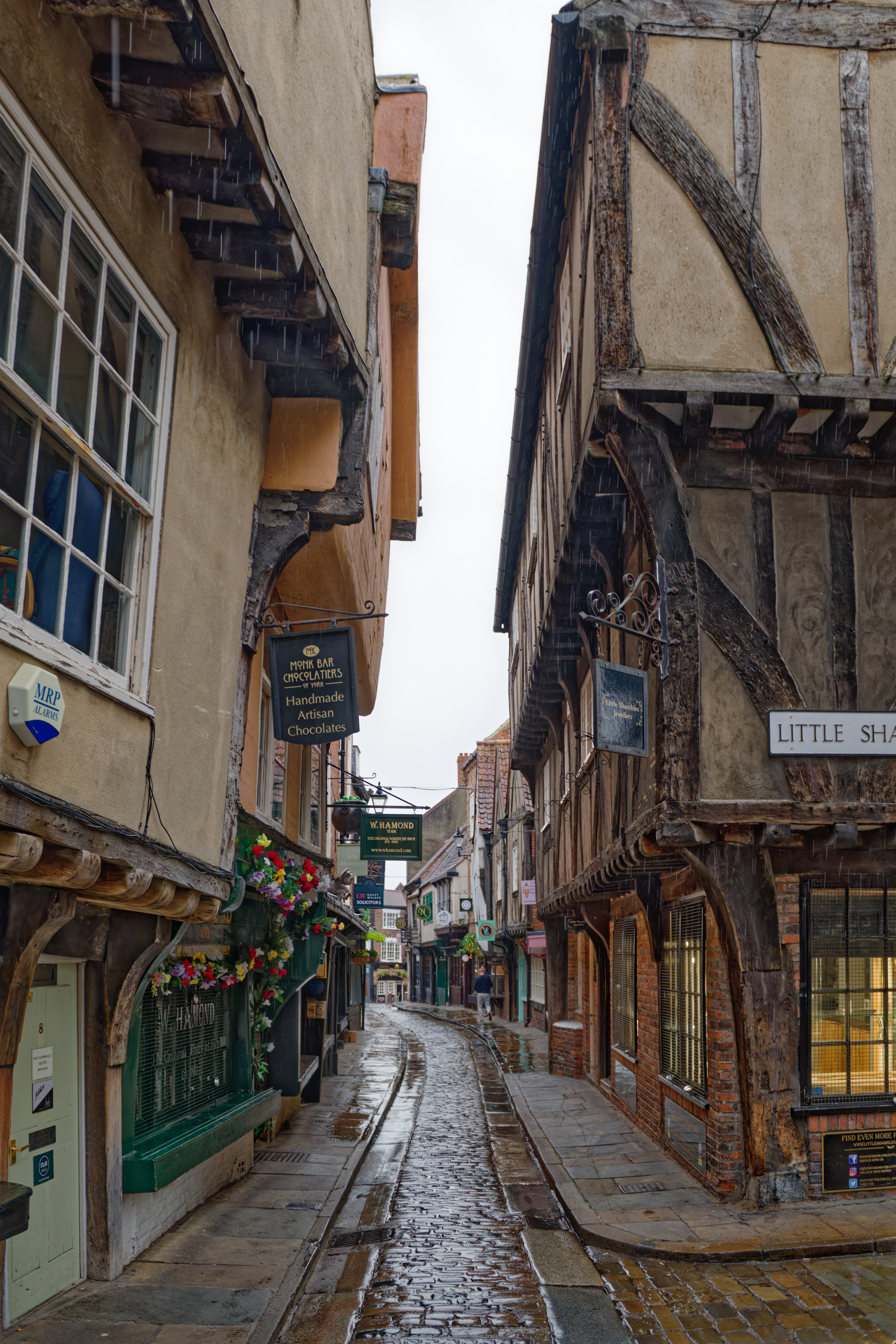
The Shambles, medieval street in York

Pavage was a medieval toll for the maintenance or improvement of a road or street in medieval England, Wales and Ireland. The king by letters patent granted the right to collect it to an individual, or the corporation of a town, or to the "bailiffs and good men" of a neighbouring village.

Pavage grants can be divided into two classes:

- Urban grants to enable the streets of a town (or its marketplace) to be paved. These represent the majority of grants.
- Rural grants to enable a particular road to be repaired. These grants were mostly made in the 14th century, and largely for the great roads radiating from London, which were presumably those carrying the heaviest traffic.

The first grant was in 1249 for the Yorkshire town of Beverley, where the pavage was associated with the cult of St John of Beverley, and was ultimately made permanent. Another early one was for Shrewsbury in 1266 for paving the new marketplace, removed from the churchyard of St Alkmund and St Juliana. In 1343 the citizens of Dublin were granted pavage for five years.

== Related tolls ==
Other medieval tolls granted in the same way were murage (to build town walls) and pontage (to build or repair a bridge).

== Sources ==
- Cooper, A. (2006). Bridges, Law and Power in Medieval England 700–1400. Woodbridge, Suffolk: Boydell. pp. 127–48. ISBN 1-84383-275-5.
- King, P. W. (2007). "Medieval Turnpikes". Journal of Railway and Canal Historical Society. 35 (10): 740–6. ISSN 0033-8834.
