= River Hindburn =

River in Lancashire, England

Coordinates: 54°06′N 2°37′W

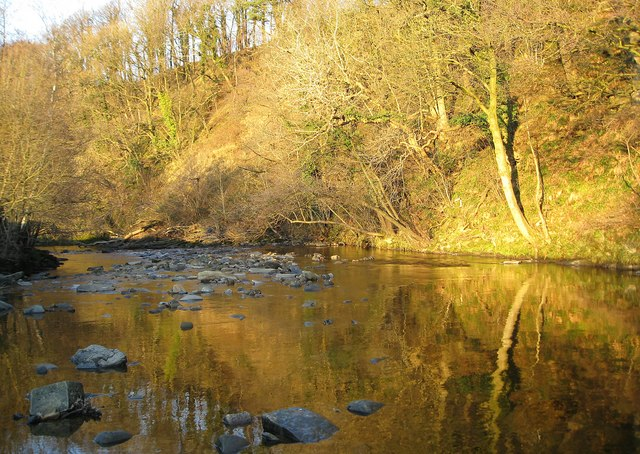
- River Hindburn, near Wray (December 2008)

Location
- Country: United Kingdom
- Part: England
- County: Lancashire

The River Hindburn is a river in Lancashire, England. The Hindburn rises at Thrushgill where three smaller streams (namely Whitray Beck, Middle Gill and Dale Beck) combine. The river proceeds northwards past Lowgill to Wray where it merges with the River Roeburn before carrying on to meet the River Wenning in Hornby Park.
