= Wray, Lancashire =

Village in Lancashire, England

Coordinates: 54.103°N 2.609°W

Wray
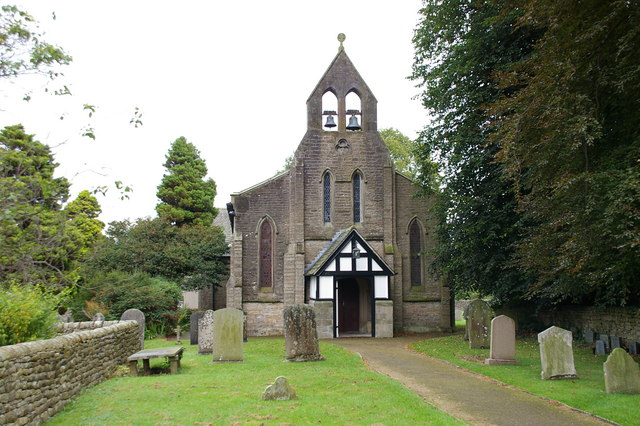
- Holy Trinity Church

- Location in the City of Lancaster district Location in the Forest of Bowland Location within Lancashire
- Population: 521 (2001)
- OS grid reference: SD602676
- Civil parish: Wray-with-Botton
- District: Lancaster
- Shire county: Lancashire
- Region: North West
- Country: England
- Sovereign state: United Kingdom
- Post town: Lancaster
- Postcode district: LA2
- Dialling code: 01524
- Police: Lancashire
- Fire: Lancashire
- Ambulance: North West
- UK Parliament: Lancaster and Fleetwood

Wray is a small village in Lancashire, England, part of the civil parish of Wray-with-Botton, in the City of Lancaster district. Wray is the point at which the River Roeburn joins the River Hindburn.

== Demographics ==
According to the 2001 census Wray-with-Botton had 521 residents, 269 male, 252 female and 200 homes.

== Facilities ==
The village has a community owned village store, Wray Village Store. The village also has a pub, The George and Dragon; a tearoom, Bridge House Farm Tearooms; and the Bridge House Bistro. The village also has Greenfoot Garden Centre offering a variety of plants and gifts.

Wray has a fibre to the home broadband network maintained by B4RN, a community owned internet service provider.

Wray was one of the first villages in the United Kingdom to have a village website.

Wray is the Scarecrow village of Lancashire, having had a 10 day festival since 1992.

Wray is home to the bi-annual "maggot races", which raises money for the North-West Air Ambulance.

== History ==
=== 1967 Wray Flood ===
A flash flood on 8 August 1967 of the river Roeburn resulted in the loss of houses, bridges, livestock, vehicles, and personal possessions. Despite the scale of the devastation, no serious injury was done to any residents. The flood is illustrated in the Millennium Mosaic, completed in September 2000, which represents the wind and storm spewing out a great tide of water. The mosaic is in the 'Flood Garden' on Main Street, the site of some of the houses demolished by the flood.

=== Railway ===
Wray railway station was between Hornby and Wennington on the "little" North Western Railway. It opened in 1849 and closed six months later.

== Scarecrow Festival ==
The Scarecrow Festival, established in 1992, takes place every year during the week leading up to May Day when there is a fair. The Festival is organised by a sub-group of the Village Institute who are all volunteers from the village. During the week leading up to May Day there are refreshments served daily in the village institute by local groups raising funds for their causes. A parade of the giant scarecrows is held on the last Saturday afternoon before May Day. Many villagers erect scarecrows outside their homes, often following the theme chosen by the Scarecrow Committee. In 2025 the theme was Circus. Local schools and care homes also build scarecrows. On the Scarecrow parade night the winning scarecrows are awarded prizes. On Easter Monday 2011, the festival's cricket match, Twicket, was live-streamed on the internet.

== See also ==
- Holy Trinity Church, Wray
