= Castle Howe =

Castle in Cumbria, England

- Kendal, Cumbria, England
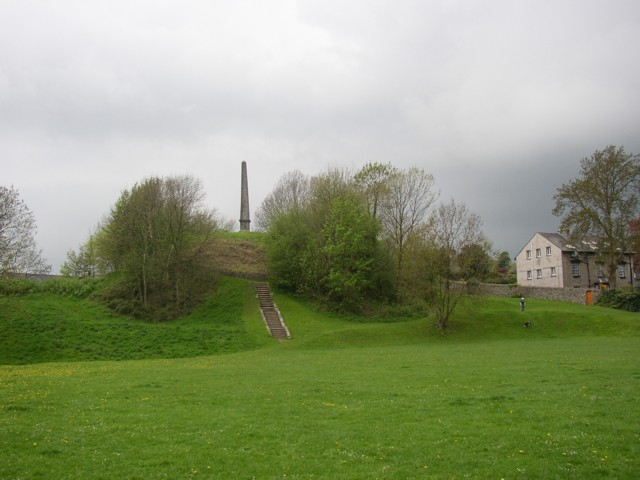
- The motte of Castle How

Site information
- Type: Motte and bailey

Location
- Location in South Lakeland Location in Cumbria
- Coordinates: 54.3239°N 2.7518°W
- Grid reference: grid reference SD512923

Castle Howe is a motte and bailey castle in the town of Kendal, England.

== History ==
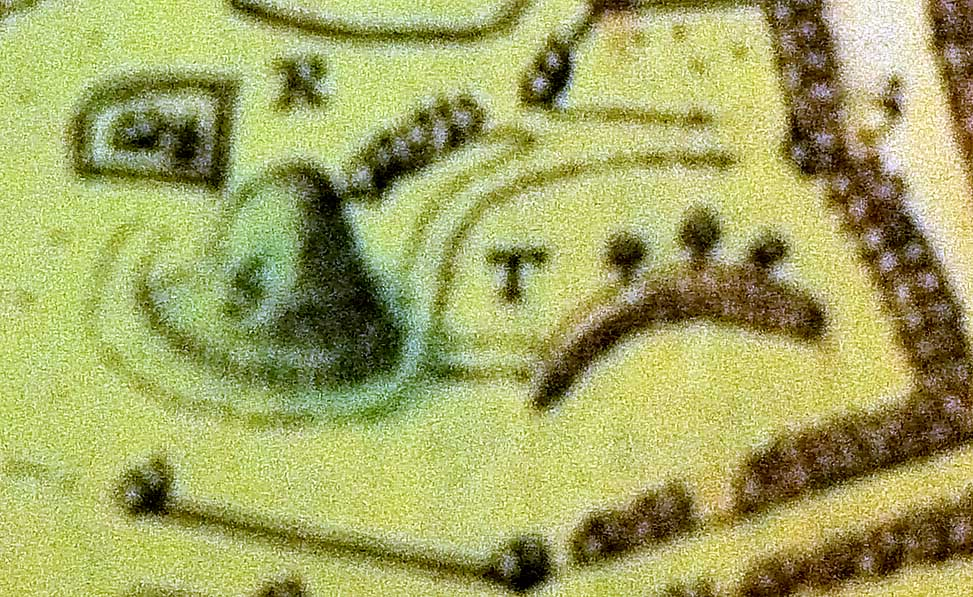
John Speed's depiction of Castle Howe in 1611, with the motte (l) and bailey (r)

Castle Howe was built after the Norman conquest of England, either in 1087 by the Norman nobleman Ivo Taillebois, or by the nobleman Ketel some time after 1100. The castle was designed as a motte and bailey fortification, with a circular motte 11 m high and 48 m wide at the base, and a curved bailey hugging the ridge alongside it.

The castle was abandoned in the 12th century, either by one Gilbert, or by William de Lancaster. The bailey was later destroyed when the area was turned into a park. The remaining earthworks are maintained South Lakeland District Council, with information boards placed at the foot of the motte.

== See also ==
- Castles in Great Britain and Ireland
- List of castles in England
