= Old Loyne Bridge =

Bridge in Lancaster, England

Coordinates: 54.052228°N 2.800713°W

The Old Loyne Bridge was the main bridge spanning the stretch of River Lune as it ran through the modern day city of Lancaster, extant and in use for at least six hundred years, leading up to its closure and partial demolition in 1802.

From the southern bank (cityside), the bridge was reached by following China Lane and Bridge Lane, leading across to what is now the vicinity of Our Lady's Catholic College.

== Early history ==
The existence of the bridge was mentioned in an official document as far back as 1216 in the reign of King John of England. It was then a wooden bridge and the Abbot of Furness was made liable to provide timber for its upkeep.

Notwithstanding the Abbot having some responsibility we have direct evidence from 1291 that Edmund Crouchback, 1st Earl of Lancaster, had responsibility for its repair. A grant was made by his brother Edward I of England for five years pontage or tolls for its repair.

During the Jacobite rising of 1715 the town governor, Colonel Charteris, was prevented from destroying the bridge for defensive reasons by the townsfolk, who pointed out that the river below was fordable and the destruction of the bridge would serve no purpose.

== Gradual demolition ==
In 1782 the condition of the bridge was so bad that Parliament passed an Act (22 Geo. 3. c. 57) for its replacement. Several accidents had been caused by gaps in the parapet. In 1800 John Brockbank, who owned land nearby, offered to buy the bridge for £250, enabling compensation to be paid to the owner of the site of the proposed new bridge.

In 1802 the first arch at the Skerton (northern) end was demolished to allow the passage of ships, including ships built upstream of the bridge at Brockbank's shipyard. A second arch fell down in 1807 as a result of floods. The third arch gave way in 1814 and the remaining pier, although shored up, collapsed into the river in 1845.

== Legacy in culture ==
Though information on the Old Loyne Bridge is difficult to access, there are numerous references in published literature to what was Lancaster's principal line of communication, as well as cultural artefacts, including the following:

=== Poetry abridged from Gleanings in Local History ===
"Thou hast stood old Neptune's billows,
In the ages gone,
Lash'd by Tim's relentless willows,
Till at length undone.
Many an eye hath watch'd in sorrow,
Foemen thous hast led,
Many a warrior e're the morrow,
Fallen by thee dead.
Native feet and feet of strangers,
Thou o'er Loyne hast borne,
Pictish Clansmen, Danish Rangers,
Heedless of their scorn.
Many a Knight in robe escallop'd,
Arm'd for the affray,
On his steed has proudly gallop'd,
O'er thy lofty way.
Storm and sunshine, peace and battle,
Thou of old hast known,
While the children's merry prattle,
Did for strife atone.
Oft the Sun in splendour shining,
Hath thy corbels charm'd,
Sylvan warblers thus inclining,
To a song thrice warm'd.
Cere's sons around have labour'd,
As those wood nymphs sang,
And the little ones have tabour'd,
While the joy bells rang.
Counting beads in deep contrition,
Saints have o'er thee pass'd,
Thinking of the great transition,
Bridge of Death at last.
Thou art vanish'd – of thy glory,
Bards alone may tell,
But, old bridge, in ancient story,
Thou shall ever dwell."
