= River Roeburn =

River in Lancashire, England

Coordinates: 54°06′N 2°36′W

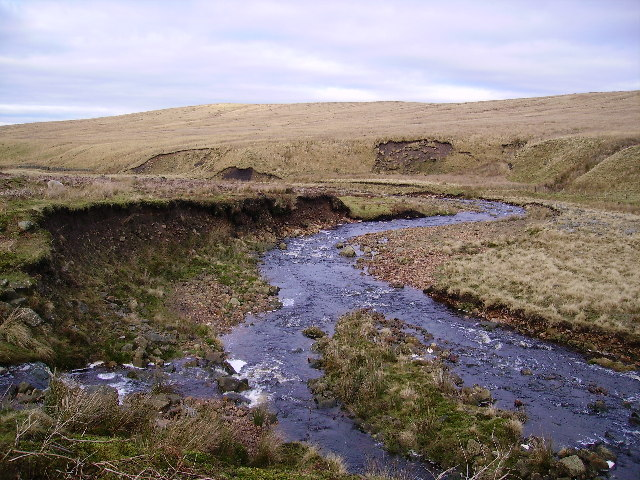
River Roeburn near Salter

The River Roeburn is a river in Lancashire, England.

Sourced at Salter Fell, the Roeburn flows northwards through Roeburndale to Wray, where it joins the River Hindburn.

Flash flooding of the river in 1967 caused substantial damage to the village of Wray.
