= Roeburndale =

Coordinates: 54.066°N 2.6111°W

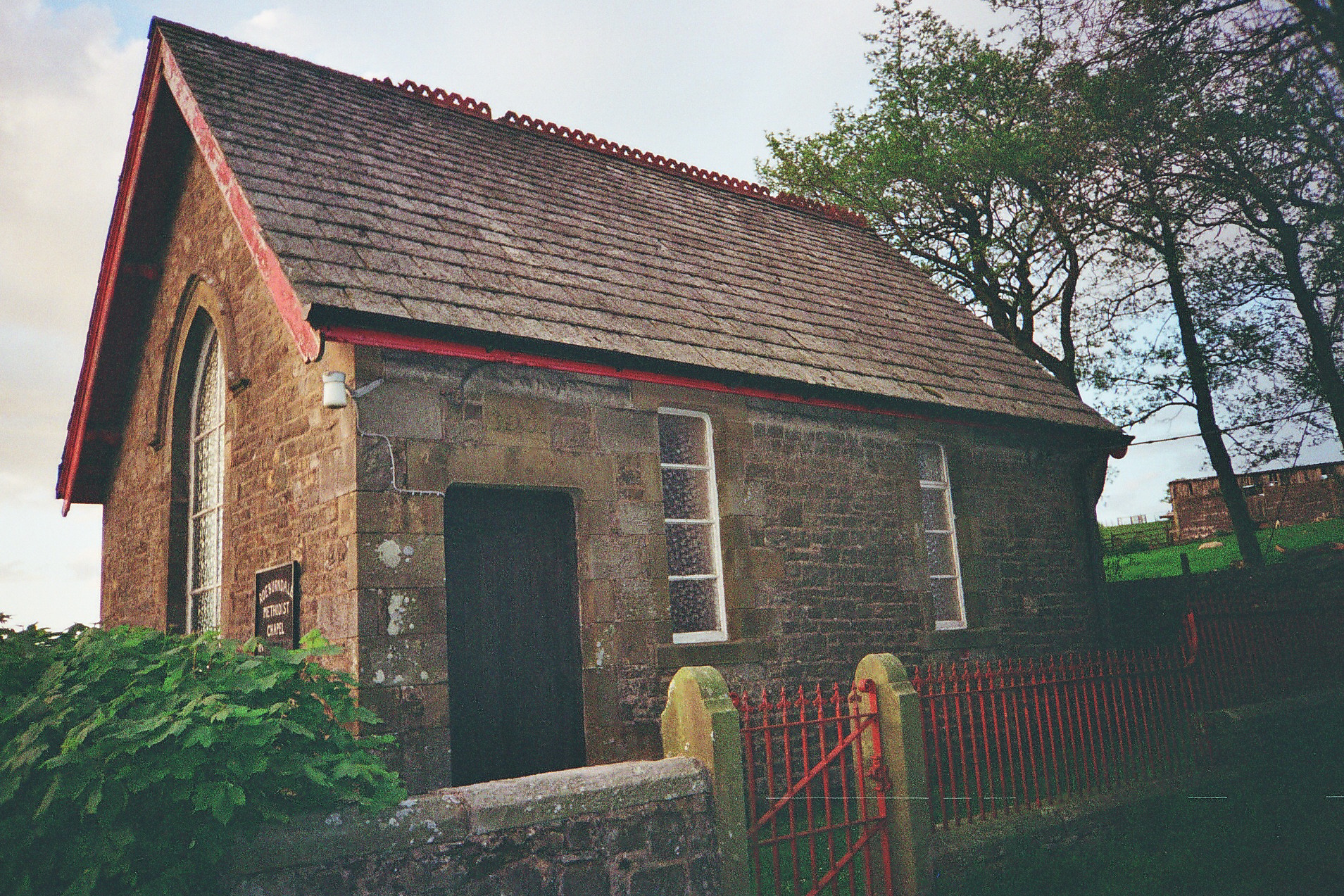
- Roeburndale Methodist Chapel

- Location in the City of Lancaster district Location in the Forest of Bowland Location within Lancashire
- Population: 76 (2001)
- OS grid reference: SD6063
- Civil parish: Roeburndale
- District: Lancaster
- Shire county: Lancashire
- Region: North West
- Country: England
- Sovereign state: United Kingdom
- Post town: LANCASTER
- Postcode district: LA2
- Dialling code: 015242
- Police: Lancashire
- Fire: Lancashire
- Ambulance: North West
- UK Parliament: Morecambe and Lunesdale

Roeburndale is a civil parish in the City of Lancaster and the English county of Lancashire. In 2001 it had a population of 76. In the 2011 census Roeburndale was grouped with Claughton. The parish includes the village of Salter. The River Roeburn flows through the parish. It gives its name to the Roeburndale geological formation.

== History ==
From the Middle Ages, Roeburndale was the Chase of the Honour of Hornby Castle.

On Tuesday 3 July 1979 a BAC Jet Provost crashed at Salter Fell. The pilot Flt Lt Thomas Durk Bayliff was killed. He had studied Aeronautical Engineering at Queen's University Belfast in 1977.

In January 2022, one person was killed and others were injured when a bridge collapsed into the River Roeburn in Roeburndale.

== See also ==
- Listed buildings in Roeburndale
