= Lancaster bus station =

Bus station in Lancaster, Lancashire, England

Lancaster Bus Station
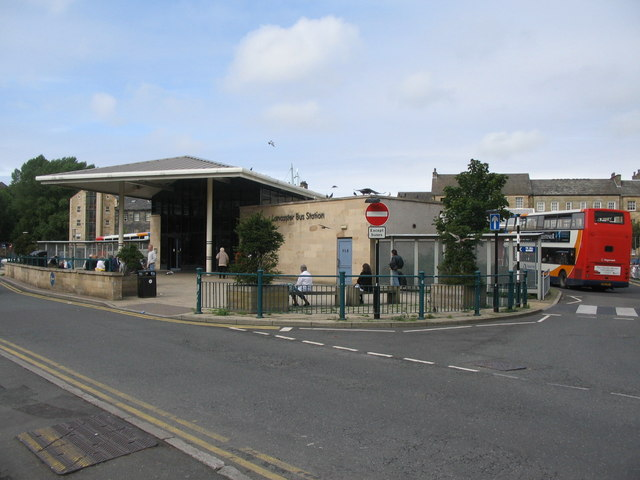
- Lancaster bus station main entrance.

General information
- Location: Damside Street, Lancaster; Lancaster City Council
- Coordinates: 54.05058°N 2.80094°W
- Operator: Lancaster City Council, Lancashire County Council
- Bus routes: 30
- Bus stands: 20
- Bus operators: Stagecoach Cumbria & North Lancashire, Kirkby Lonsdale Coaches
- Connections: Lancaster railway station (800 metres)

History
- Opened: 2001
Location
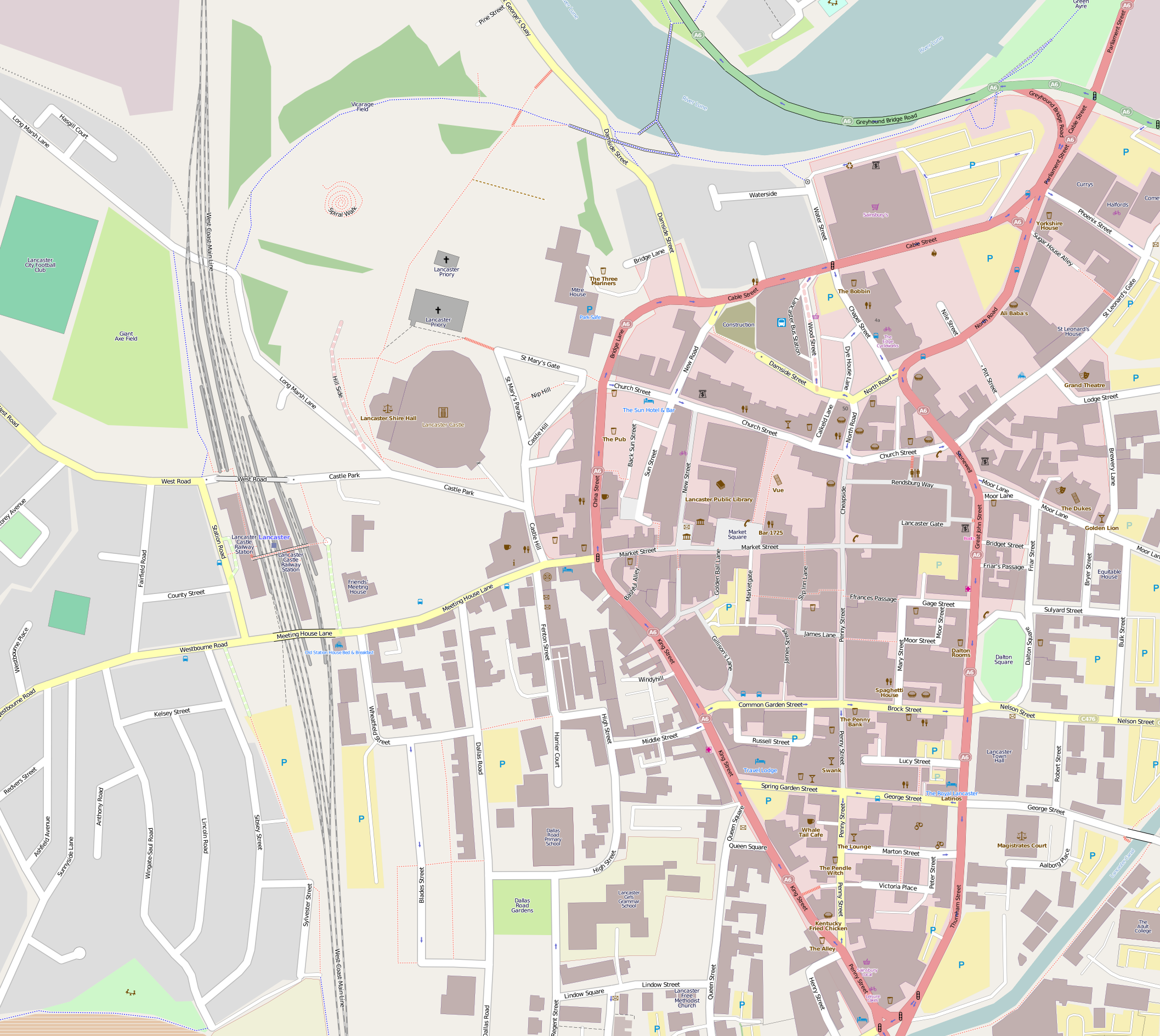
- Location within Lancaster city centre

Lancaster bus station serves the city of Lancaster, Lancashire, England. The bus station was funded by both the Lancashire County Council and Lancaster City Council. The station, situated in the centre of the city, was rebuilt and opened in 2001, replacing the previous bus station dating to 1939. It is staffed full-time, completely covered and consists of 20 stands, a refreshment kiosk, on-site toilet facilities and an electronic passenger information board. Directly outside the bus station is Lancaster's main taxi rank.

== Operations ==
Out of the 20 stands at the bus station there is 30 routes serving them.

== Services ==
The main services from the bus station are operated by Stagecoach Cumbria & North Lancashire with some additional services being run by local firm Kirkby Lonsdale Coaches. Buses mainly travel from the bus station around the Lancaster, Morecambe, Heysham and Carnforth areas, but regular services also run as far afield as Preston, Blackpool through services 40, 41 and 42. Knott End-on-Sea is also served every hour or two via services 88 and 89. Skipton, Settle and Ingleton are also served but infrequently through linked DalesBus services 81, 82, 580 and 581. Kirkby Lonsdale, Kendal, Keswick and the central Lake District in Cumbria (route 555) are also served.

The following routes run out of the bus station:

Number	route	Operator	Via	Notes
1/1A	Lancaster University or Heysham	Stagecoach	Morecambe	Peak times extends to Overton
2X	Heysham then Morecambe	Stagecoach	Sandylands	Direct service
4	Lancaster University	Stagecoach	Scotforth	
6A	Morecambe	Stagecoach	Asda	
7	Vale Circular	Stagecoach		
8	Ryelands’s Circular	Kirkby Lonsdale coach hire		
X8	Chorley or Keswick	Stagecoach		Saturday only / Summer only
9	Bowerham Circular	Kirkby Lonsdale coach hire		
10	Ridge Circular	Stagecoach		
11	Marsh Circular	Stagecoach		
18	East City Circular	Kirkby Lonsdale coach hire		Stagecoach runs service on Sundays
40/41	Morecambe or Preston	Stagecoach	Garstang	40 does not operate on Sundays
42	Blackpool	Stagecoach	Garstang	
55	Carnforth	Stagecoach	Hest Bank	
81	Hornby	Kirkby Lonsdale coach hire		Stagecoach operates evening services
82	Kirkby Lonsdale	Kirkby Lonsdale coach hire		
85	Carnforth	Kirkby Lonsdale coach hire	Morecambe	No Sunday Service
88	Knott End-on-Sea	Stagecoach	Garstang	
89	Knott End-on-Sea	Stagecoach		
100	Morecambe or Lancaster University	Stagecoach	Bare	
555	Keswick	Stagecoach	Kendal, Carnforth, Windermere, Ambleside, Grasmere	Express also operates that skips Carnforth
755	Bowness-on-windermere	Stagecoach	Heysham, Morecambe, Carnforth, Kendal, Windermere	Once per day (Mon-Fri)
L1	Lancaster Park and Ride	Kirkby Lonsdale coach hire		

== Connections ==
Lancaster railway station, which is approximately half a mile from the bus station and is on the West Coast Main Line, has a regular number 11 service from the bus station. As of March 2026, the route is run by Stagecoach and the route runs every 30 minutes (Monday to Saturday) and every hour on a Sunday.
