= 555 (disambiguation) =

555 may refer to:

== Number and year ==
- 555 (number)
- 555, a year of the Julian calendar
- 555 BC, a year of the 6th century BC

== Telephone number ==
- 555 (New Zealand telephone number)
- 555 (North American Numbering Plan)

== Entertainment ==
- 555 (1988 film), a direct-to-video horror film
- "555", a song by Sebastian Ingrosso
- "555", a song performed by the band Phish and written by Mike Gordon
- "555", a song by Jimmy Eat World from Surviving
- 5:55, an album by Charlotte Gainsbourg
- Ainthu Ainthu Ainthu or Five Five Five or 555, an Indian film
- Kamen Rider 555, also called Kamen Rider Faiz, a Japanese tokusatsu television series

== Others ==
- 555, a Thai-language internet slang equivalent to LOL
- 555 timer IC, an integrated circuit used in a variety of timer, pulse generation, and oscillator applications
- State Express 555, a brand of cigarette
- Stagecoach bus route 555, a bus route from Lancaster to Keswick in England
