= Hame =

Hame, Häme or hames may refer to:

== Places ==
- Häme, a geographical region of Finland
- Kanta-Häme, a region of Finland commonly known as Häme prior to 1998
- Häme (parliamentary electoral district), a Finnish constituency represented in the Parliament of Finland
- Häme Province, a province of Finland from 1831 to 1997
- Hame, Debar, a village in North Macedonia

== People ==
- Hamé (born 1975), French filmmaker and rapper
- Hame Faiva (born 1994), New Zealand-born Italian rugby union player
- Hame Sele (born 1996), Australian rugby league footballer

== Other uses ==
- Antidesma platyphyllum, a species of flowering tree in the leafflower family
- Hame, a fictional planet in Isaac Asimov's Foundation series; see Trantor
- Hames, part of a horse collar; see Horse harness § Parts
- Hame, English cognate of Old Norse: hamr; see Hamr (folklore)
