= Carnforth High School =

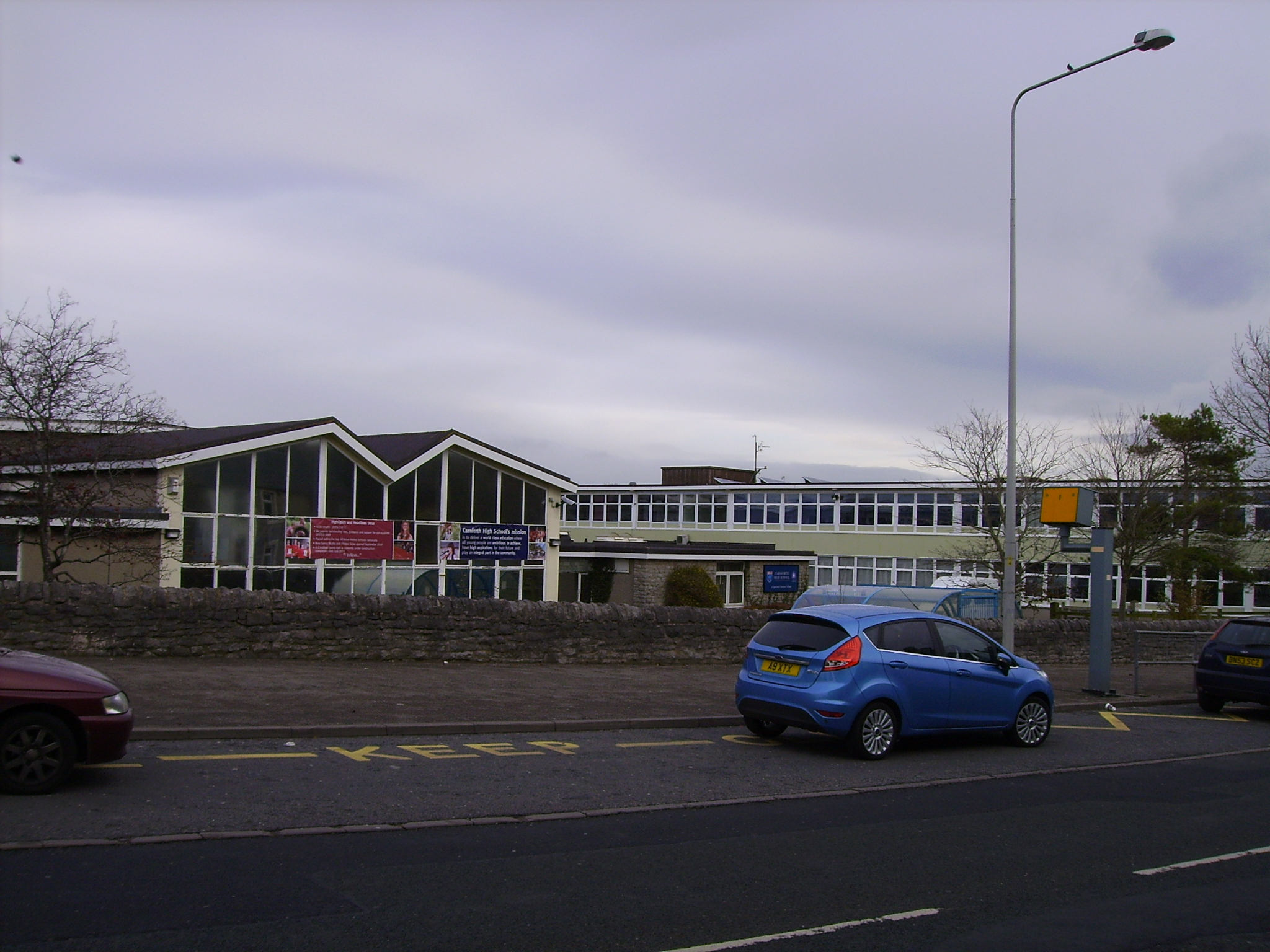
- Outside view of school

Location
- Kellet Road; Carnforth, Lancashire, LA5 9LS; England; 54.1258°N 2.7608°W

Information
- Type: Academy
- Established: 1959
- Local authority: Lancashire
- Trust: The Bay Learning Trust
- Department for Education URN: 145082 Tables
- Ofsted: Reports
- Chair of Governors: Mike Dudfield
- Head teacher: Paul Staniforth
- Gender: Coeducational
- Age: 11 to 16
- Publication: Carnforth Courier
- Website: www.carnforthhigh.co.uk

Carnforth High School is a coeducational secondary school located in Carnforth, Lancashire, England. The school previously held specialist Science College status.

Previously a community school administered by Lancashire County Council, in June 2018 Carnforth High School converted to academy status. The school is now sponsored by The Bay Learning Trust.
