= Albert Halton =

English Victoria Cross recipient (1893-1971)

- Born: 1 May 1893; Warton, near Carnforth, Lancashire
- Died: 24 July 1971 (aged 78); Lancaster, Lancashire
- Military career
- Allegiance: United Kingdom
- Branch: British Army
- Rank: Private
- Units: King's Own Royal Regiment (Lancaster); Home Guard
- Conflicts: World War I World War II
- Awards: Victoria Cross

Albert Halton VC (1 May 1893 – 24 July 1971) was an English recipient of the Victoria Cross, the highest and most prestigious award for gallantry in the face of the enemy that can be awarded to British and Commonwealth forces.

== Details ==
Halton was born in Warton near Carnforth, Lancashire. He was 24 years old, and a private in the 1st Battalion, the King's Own Royal Regiment (Lancaster), British Army during the First Battle of Passchendaele of the First World War when the following deed took place, for which he was awarded the VC:

On 12 October 1917 near Poe, Belgium, after the objective had been reached, Private Halton rushed forward about 300 yards under very heavy fire and captured a machine-gun and its crew, which was causing heavy losses to our men. He then went out again and brought in 12 prisoners.

After the war Halton was an ironworker until his retirement in 1961, and during World War II he served in the Home Guard.

A commemorative plaque was installed in Sparrow Park, Warton, unveiled on 12 October 2017 by the Deputy Mayor of Lancaster.

== The medal ==
His VC is displayed at the King's Own Royal Regiment (Lancaster) Museum, in Lancaster, England.

== Bibliography ==
- Snelling, Stephen (2012) [1998]. Passchendaele 1917. VCs of the First World War. The History Press. ISBN 978-0752476667.
