= Alexander Dennis Enviro400 MMC =

Low-floor double-decker bus

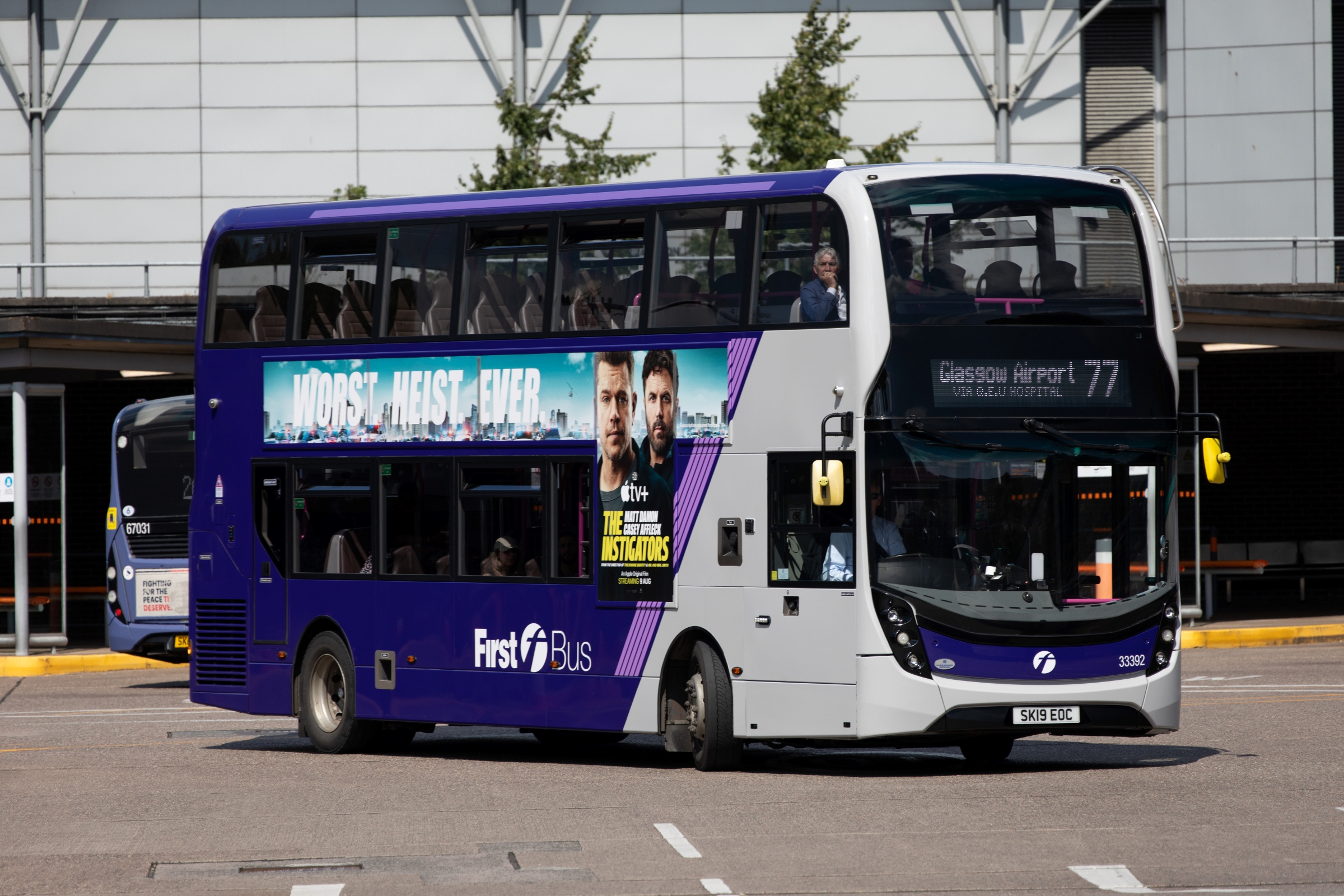
- First Glasgow Enviro400 MMC in July 2024

Overview
- Manufacturer: Alexander Dennis
- Production: 2014–present

Body and chassis
- Doors: Single or dual door
- Floor type: Low floor
- Chassis: Alexander Dennis Enviro400 MMC; Scania N250UD; Scania N280UD; Volvo B5LH; Volvo B5TL; Volvo B8L
- Related: Alexander Dennis Enviro200 MMC; Alexander Dennis Enviro400 City

Powertrain
- Engine: Cummins 6.7 ISB (Enviro400 MMC); Scania DC09 (Scania N2x0UD); Volvo D5K (Volvo B5LH/TL); Volvo D8K (Volvo B8L)
- Electric motor: 2 x BYD 150kW in-wheel
- Capacity: 64–100 seated
- Power output: 250 hp (190 kW); 240 hp (180 kW) - Volvo B5LH/TL; 350 hp (260 kW) - Volvo B8L; 250–280 hp (190–210 kW) - Scania DC09
- Transmission: Voith; ZF; Volvo I-Shift; BAE Systems HybriDrive
- Battery: 320 kWh lithium iron phosphate
- Range: 303 kilometres (188 mi)

Dimensions
- Length: 2-axle Enviro400 MMC: 10.3 m (33 ft 10 in); 10.5 m (34 ft 5 in); 10.8 m (35 ft 5 in); 10.9 m (35 ft 9 in); 11.4 m (37 ft 5 in); 11.5 m (37 ft 9 in); 3-axle Enviro400 XLB: 12.8 m (42 ft 0 in); 13.4 m (44 ft 0 in)
- Width: 2.55 m (8 ft 4 in)
- Height: 4.2 m (13 ft 9 in) to 4.3 m (14 ft 1 in)
- Curb weight: 11 tonnes (10.8 long tons; 12.1 short tons)

Chronology
- Predecessor: Alexander Dennis Enviro400
- Successor: Alexander Dennis Enviro400EV

The Alexander Dennis Enviro400 MMC (sold and badged as the Alexander Dennis Enviro400) is a low-floor double-decker bus produced by the British bus manufacturer Alexander Dennis since 2014, replacing the Alexander Dennis Enviro400. The Enviro400 MMC is produced at Alexander Dennis' Falkirk and Scarborough factories in the United Kingdom.

The Enviro400 MMC is available as a complete integral bus – including an alternative styling, the Enviro400 City – or as a bus bodywork on Scania and Volvo chassis. A tri-axle variant, known as the Enviro400 XLB, is also produced. The Enviro400 MMC is available powered by either Euro VI diesel, compressed natural gas (CNG), hybrid-electric or fully-electric powertrains.

== Background ==
The Enviro400 MMC can trace its design roots back to 1997, with the introduction of the Dennis Trident 2, one of the first low-floor double-decker buses to enter service. The model saw immense success at the turn of the millennium, despite financial difficulties facing Dennis Specialist Vehicles during this period. As a result of these, production of the Trident 2 passed first to TransBus International in 2001 and then to Alexander Dennis in 2004.

Alexander Dennis updated the basic Trident 2 chassis to launch the Alexander Dennis Enviro400 in 2005 – the basic chassis of which was initially still badged internally as a Trident. A second-generation Enviro400 was launched in 2009, with facelifted styling and updated chassis design which finally dropped the Trident moniker. The second-generation Enviro400 was overhauled again to create the Enviro400 MMC, which was launched as the classic model's eventual replacement in 2014. Production of the Enviro400 ceased in 2018.

== Core body designs ==
=== Enviro400 MMC ===
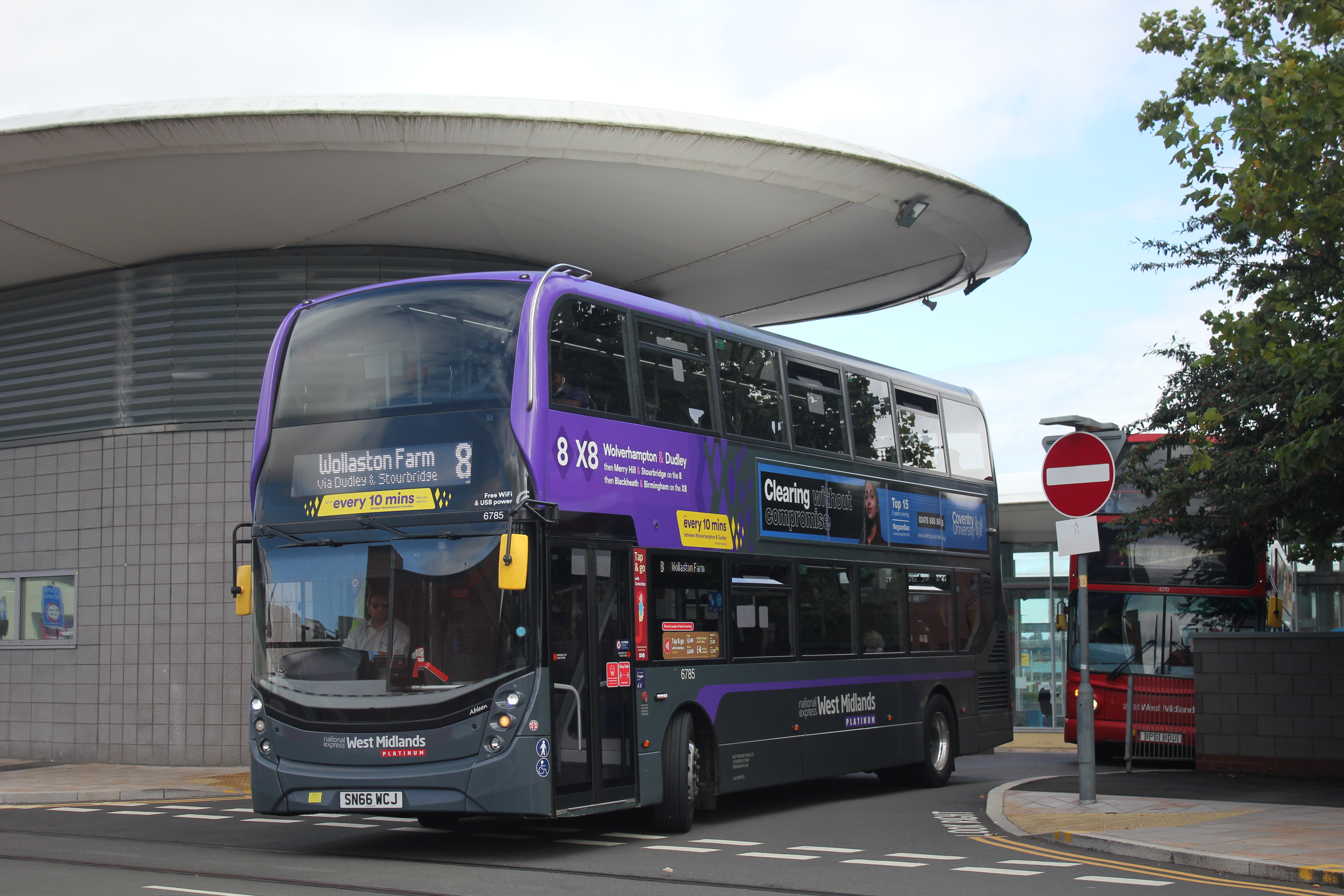
An Enviro400 MMC operated by National Express West Midlands

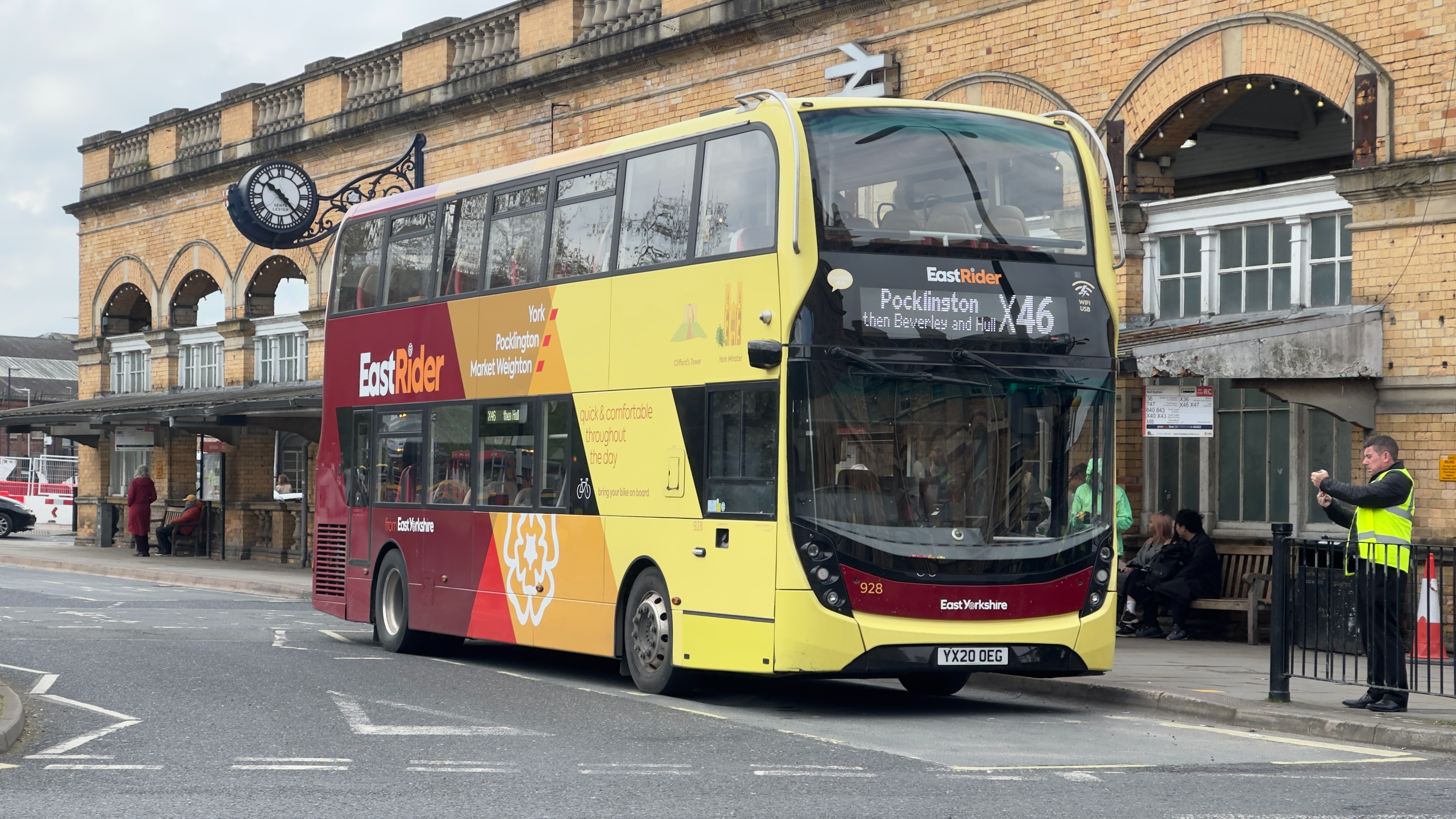
An ADL Enviro400 MMC wearing EastRider livery operated by East Yorkshire

The Enviro400 MMC (Major Model Change) was unveiled by Alexander Dennis on 1 May 2014 as the successor to the Enviro400. Compared to the Enviro400, changes included a complete body redesign with new front and rear ends and Euro VI engines as standard. The Oxford Bus Company were among the first operators to purchase the Enviro400 MMC, followed by the Go-Ahead Group, the Stagecoach Group and Reading Buses.

The Stagecoach Group, the founders of which were shareholders of Alexander Dennis until 2019, operate a large number of Enviro400 MMCs across the group's operations in England, Wales and Scotland. Outside London, some of the largest fleets are in service with their Manchester and Merseyside and South Lancashire subsidiaries. Most have been delivered to the company's standard single-door specification, but there have been some exceptions: at Stagecoach East Midlands, six Enviro400 MMCs entered service on Lincolnshire InterConnect cross-county services in November 2017 in a purple variation of the standard Stagecoach livery, while sixteen Enviro400 MMCs entered service at Mansfield depot between 2018 and 2020 for the Nottingham to Chesterfield 'Pronto' service. Stagecoach East introduced 22 dual-door Enviro400 MMCs painted in colour-coded liveries to Cambridge's park & ride network in 2017, while Stagecoach Bluebird introduced eight branded Enviro400 MMCs equipped with luggage racks to its 'JET 727' service to Aberdeen Airport, and 12 branded examples were introduced to Stagecoach Cumbria & North Lancashire's scenic 'The Lakes Connection 555' service in the Lake District in 2016; these were replaced by nine Enviro400 MMCs with improved interiors in April 2023. Enviro400 MMCs for Stagecoach Gold services began to be delivered from 2016 onwards; examples have entered service with Stagecoach South, Stagecoach Yorkshire, Stagecoach West and Stagecoach Merseyside & South Lancashire.

National Express West Midlands (NXWM) also operate a large number of Enviro400 MMCs, mainly for its high-specification Platinum network. Deliveries of the first batches of these buses began in 2015 with deliveries of over one hundred of the type for services in Birmingham. 58 of these were delivered with Platinum branding, with the remaining order being delivered in the company's standard 'crimson' livery. A further 96 Platinum Enviro400 MMCs were purchased in 2016 for services in the Black Country, 38 more were delivered throughout December 2017 for services in Harborne, and 72 more were delivered in 2018 for the 9, 50, X10 and X70 services, as well as for sister company National Express Coventry's first Platinum services. Enviro400 MMCs built to similar specification were also purchased for service with Xplore Dundee between 2018 and 2019. Orders of the diesel Enviro400 MMC ceased in 2020 after National Express pledged to stop buying diesel buses for its West Midlands and Coventry operations.

The Enviro400 MMC has also received orders from the FirstGroup. First Scotland East received 19 Enviro400 MMCs in 2016 for services in West Lothian, and a total of 96 Enviro400 MMCs were delivered to First Glasgow by 2019. Enviro400 MMCs have also entered service with First West of England, primarily for its Bristol operation, First West Yorkshire, who had eight high-specification Enviro400 MMCs delivered for the Wharfedale Connection X84 service between Leeds and Skipton, and with First Kernow, where 51 Enviro400 MMCs entered service on the company's branded services. 16 Enviro400 MMCs were delivered to Go Cornwall Bus in 2020 following the subsequent tendering of the entire Cornwall Council/Transport for Cornwall bus network to the Go-Ahead Group.

Arriva UK Bus also operate Enviro400 MMCs. Arriva Midlands introduced 35 of the type for services in Leicester in 2016, while 18 were delivered to Arriva Southend that same year. In 2017, Arriva North East introduced 12 Enviro400 MMCs, delivered to newly redesigned Arriva Sapphire specification for services to Newcastle upon Tyne and Ashington, and Arriva Yorkshire placed 50 Enviro400 MMCs into service at their Castleford and Heckmondwike depots, with thirteen delivered to Sapphire specification for Leeds to Dewsbury and Halifax services 254 and 255 and the remaining 37 delivered in standard fleet livery. 47 Enviro400 MMCs were later delivered to Arriva North East's Ashington and Arriva Midlands' Thurmaston depots in mid-2022.

East Yorkshire and then-parent company Go North East placed fourteen Enviro400 MMCs with high-specification interiors into service in November 2019 for services in and around Kingston upon Hull and Newcastle upon Tyne. More Enviro400 MMCs were delivered to both companies in 2020; Go North East took on eleven Enviro400 MMCs in two batches for a pair of flagship X-Lines express routes, while eight Enviro400 MMCs built to similar specification were delivered to East Yorkshire in August 2020 for use on flagship EastRider services X46 and 45 serving Hull, Bridlington and York.

Transdev Blazefield ordered a batch of Enviro 400 MMCs for two of their flagship services in December 2020. Built to Transdev's own "Sky Class" specification, fourteen were allocated to the Witchway X43 between Burnley and Manchester, with next stop announcements on these buses voiced by Coronation Street actress Jennie McAlpine. The remaining five of the new vehicles were allocated to the CityZap express route between Leeds and York, featuring next stop announcements voiced by BBC Yorkshire and Lincolnshire weather forecaster Paul Hudson.

In 2016, Bluestar took delivery of 10 Enviro400 MMCs, primarily for use on the Bluestar 1 between Southampton and Winchester. A further five Enviro400 MMCs were also delivered between 2019 and 2020. Bluestar also took delivery of 32 Enviro400 MMCs for their Unilink operation in 2018, which allowed displacement of buses to Bluestar in order to replace the older buses in their fleet. Fellow Go-Ahead company morebus of Dorset took delivery of 28 Enviro400 MMCs in October 2023 for use on routes m1 and m2 serving Bournemouth, Westbourne and Poole, with Bluestar subsequently taking delivery of 16 more Enviro400 MMCs in May 2024 following major expansions to its bus network. In January 2026, it was announced that morebus would receive 5 additional Enviro400 MMCs to arrive in spring 2026 for their New Forest Breezer brand, serving routes from Lymington to Bournemouth and Southampton.

Other operators of conventional Enviro400 MMCs include Cardiff Bus, who had ten of the type delivered in 2015, followed by a further seven on rental from the Mistral Group in 2022; Southern Vectis, who took delivery of 16 Enviro400 MMCs in 2017 and another seven in November 2023; Yellow Buses, who took delivery of six in 2017, and Borders Buses, who took three of the type which were fitted with lower deck bicycle carriers in 2019.

=== Enviro400 City ===
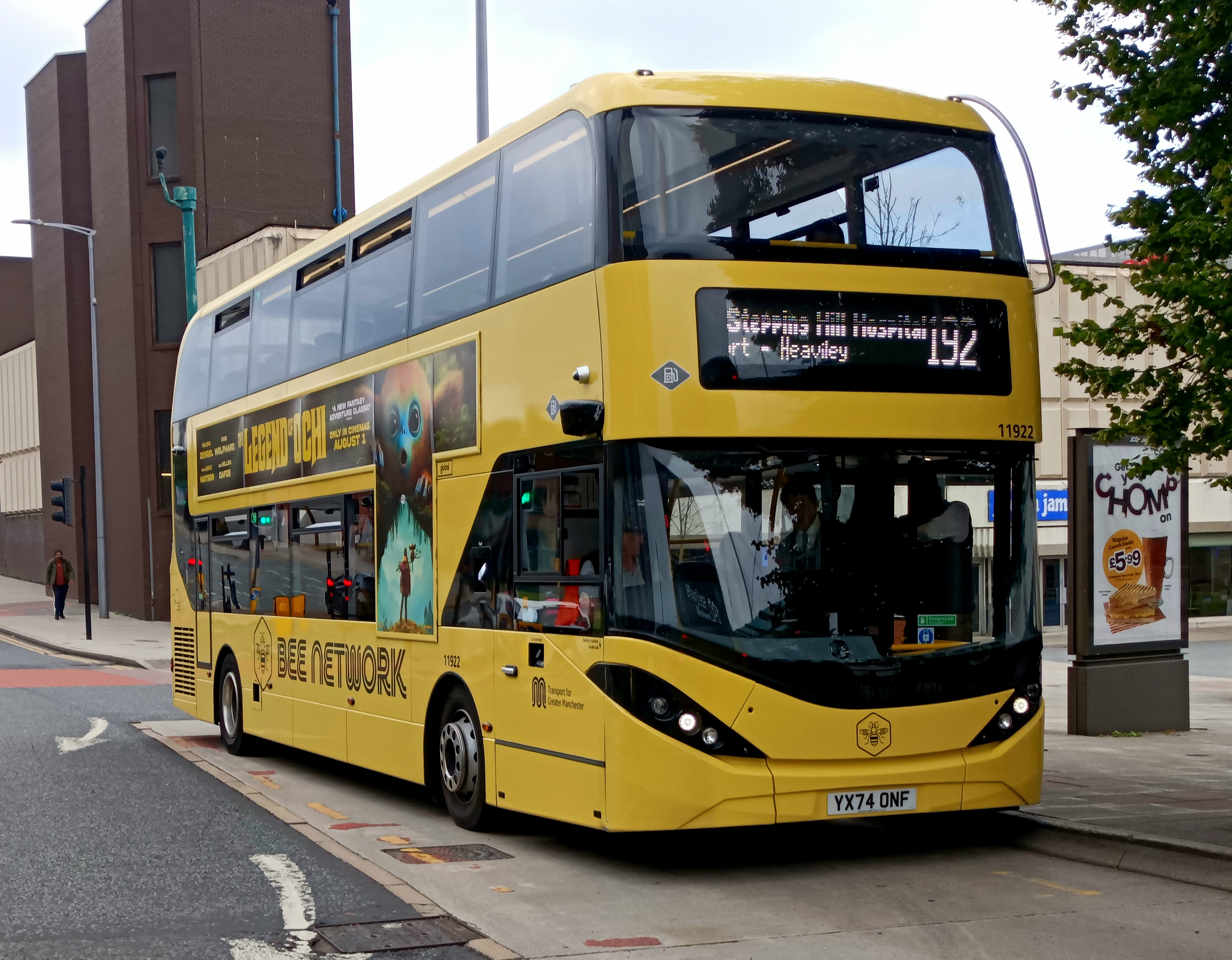
An Enviro400 City operated by Stagecoach Manchester

In late 2015, Alexander Dennis launched the Enviro400 City, a premium model of the Enviro400 MMC, featuring a restyled front end to match the single-decker Enviro200 MMC and a glass staircase as standard amongst other features, designed to compete with the New Routemaster and Wright SRM designs in the London bus market. The first production examples, built with hybrid powertrains, entered service with Arriva London on route 78; a repeat order in 2016 would later see this fleet grow to a total of 53 Enviro400 Cities.

=== Enviro400 XLB ===
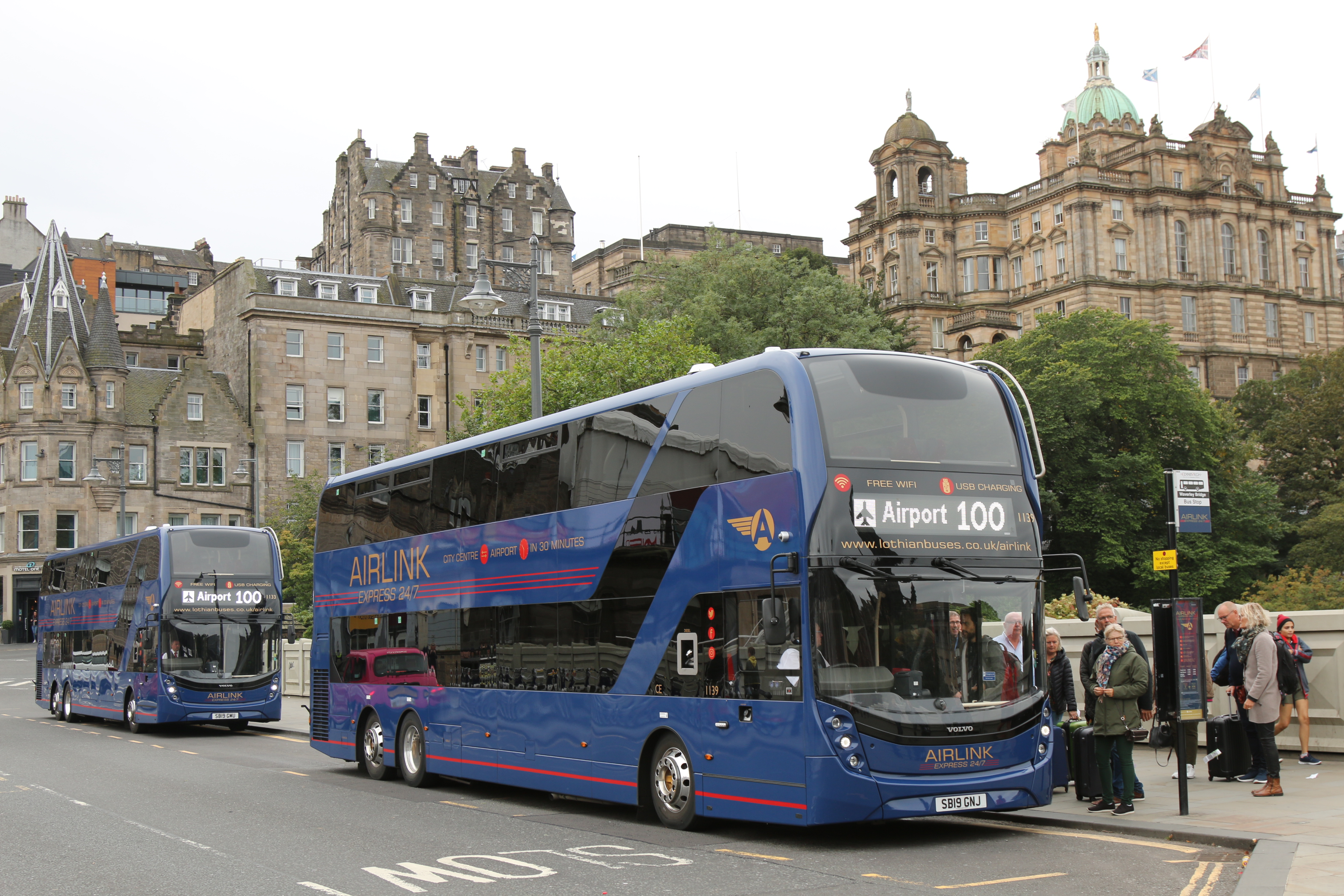
Airlink branded Enviro400 XLBs operated by Lothian Buses on Waverley Bridge

The tri-axle Enviro400 XLB was launched in late 2018, providing an equivalent option to the Enviro500 MMC for the United Kingdom market. The Enviro400 XLB features essentially the same body style as the standard Enviro400 MMC, but stretched over three axles and fitted onto Volvo B8L chassis. Lothian Buses were the launch customer for the Enviro400 XLB, with an initial order of 42 vehicles for inner city core routes, which was followed by further examples delivered later in the year for service on the Airlink network to Edinburgh Airport, bringing the fleet up to 78 buses. A further 60 examples built to a shorter 12.8 m (42 ft) length and specified with a single set of doors were ordered in June 2026, with a majority due for the operator's Lothian Country and East Coast Buses divisions and the remainder allocated to the Airlink. The only other operator to take delivery of Enviro400 XLBs was Stagecoach East, who took twelve equipped with guide wheels for use on the Cambridgeshire Busway in early 2020.

== Powertrain variants ==
=== Enviro400H/ER/VE ===
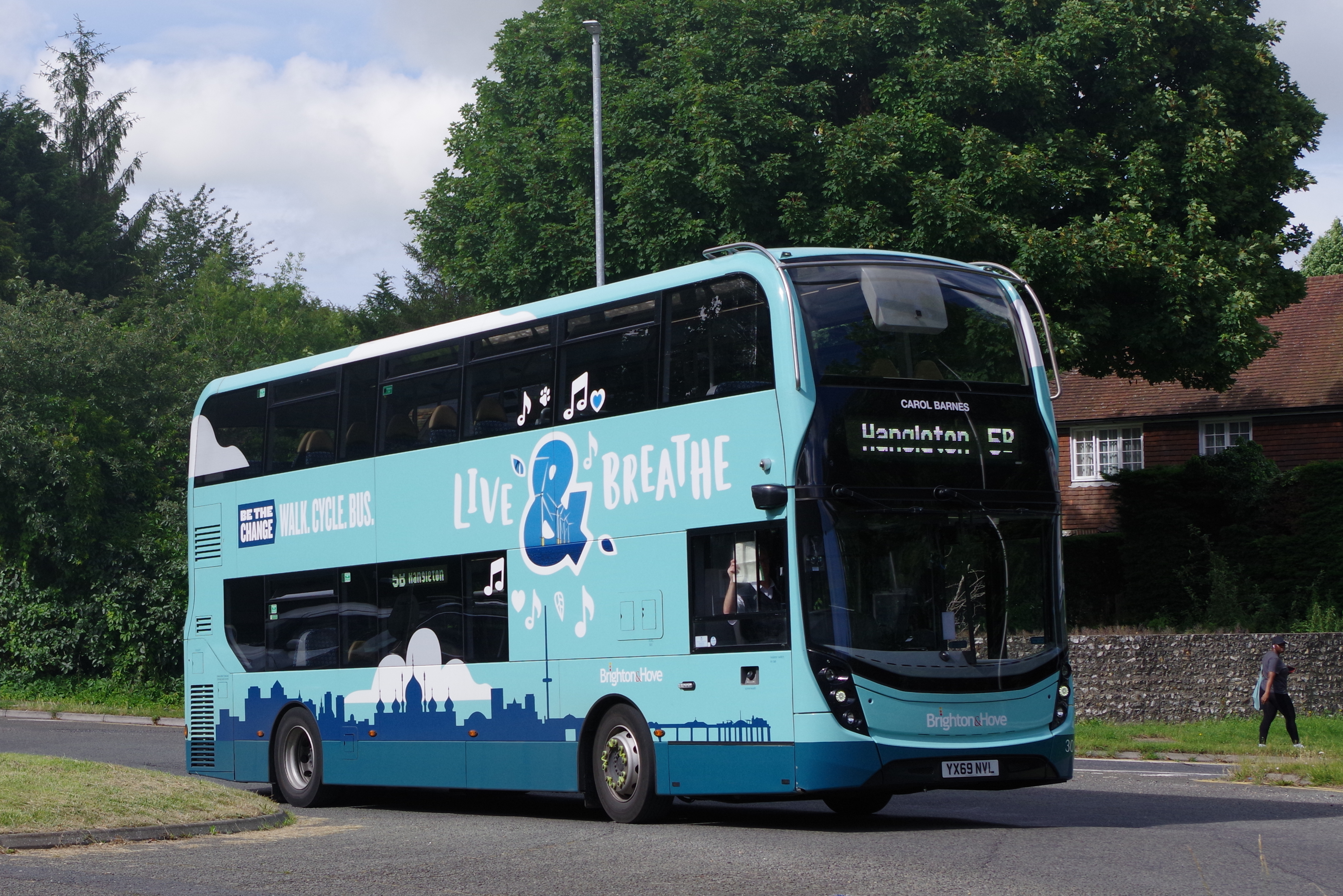
Brighton & Hove Enviro400ER in Falmer in June 2022

The Enviro400H hybrid electric platform developed by Alexander Dennis and BAE Systems was carried over from the previous Enviro400, and the first examples of the type began to enter service in 2015. The Enviro400H was initially launched with the MMC-style body, although the City-style body was also made available from late 2015; the City was first unveiled at the UK Bus & Coach Expo at the National Exhibition Centre, Birmingham in September 2015. Ultracapacitors were introduced to the range in 2018 to increase the electric range and remove the need for mid-life battery replacement.

In London, Metroline were the first Transport for London operator to order Enviro400 MMCs, ordering 16 of the type on the Enviro400H chassis in 2014 for service on route 332. It was however beaten into service by Abellio London in January 2015, whose 45 Enviro400Hs became the first Enviro400 MMCs to enter service in London on routes 109, 350 and 415. Vast numbers of Enviro400Hs with MMC bodywork have since entered service with Stagecoach London, Go-Ahead London, Abellio London and Arriva London.

Three Enviro400H MMCs were delivered to Dublin Bus in 2019 as part of a nine-vehicle evaluation of hybrid buses.

Brighton & Hove took delivery of 54 MMC-bodied Enviro400ER buses in two batches between 2019 and 2020. These are geofenced to operate in electric mode when entering Brighton city centre's Ultra Low Emissions Zone (ULEZ). The Enviro400ER was developed as the successor to the Enviro400H, and was first offered on the Enviro400 City body to Transport for Ireland.

Prior to the launch of the Enviro400EV, the Enviro400 Virtual Electric drivetrain was developed by Alexander Dennis. 100kWh charging plates mounted into the road at bus termini and range extenders allowed for a range of 12 to 14 hours of service a day. Only five Enviro400 Virtual Electrics were produced, with Tower Transit taking three and the remaining two entering service with First West of England in Bristol.

=== Scania Enviro400 MMC ===
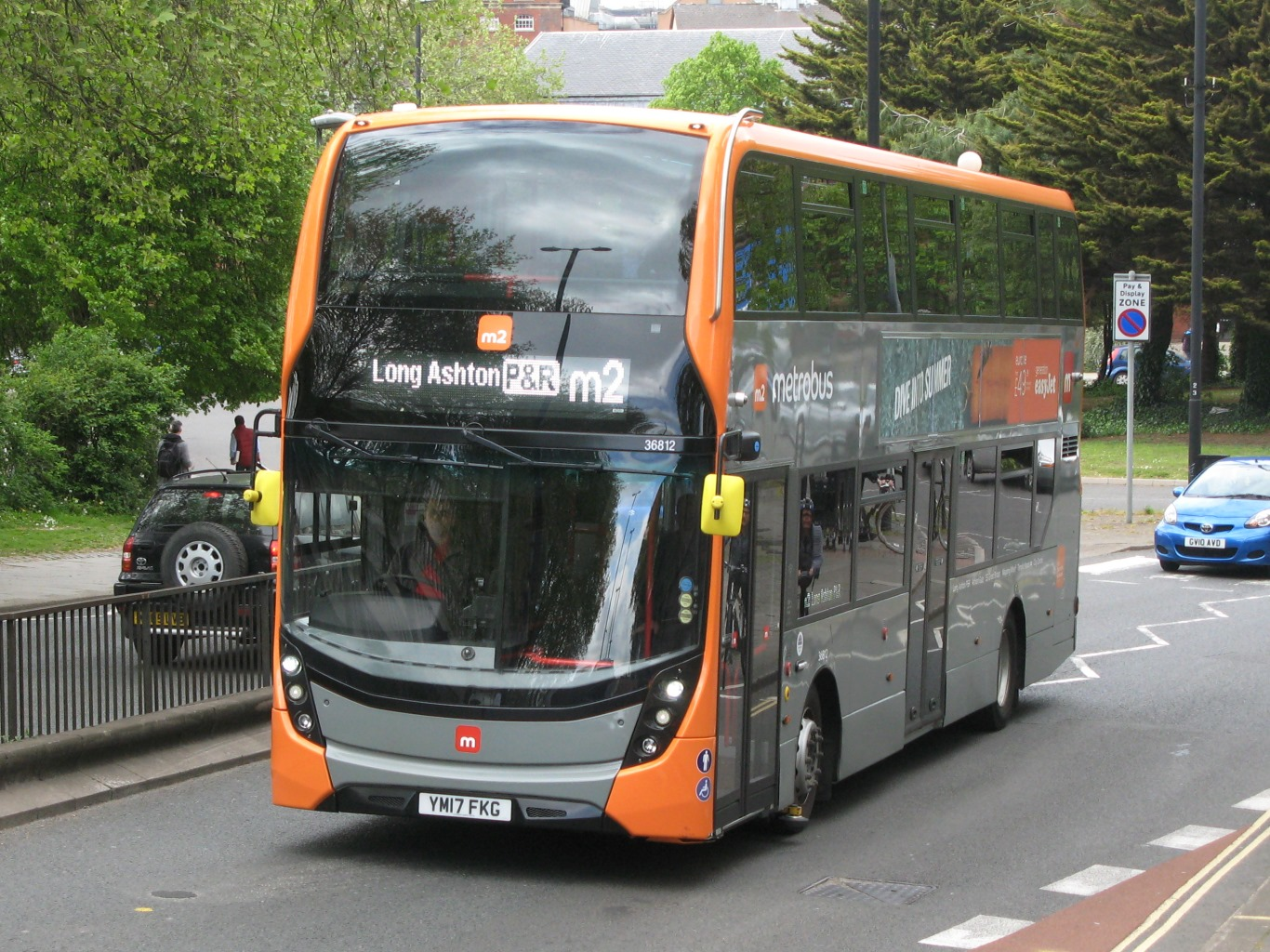
A First Bristol MetroBus Enviro400 MMC-bodied Scania N250UD in May 2019

The body of the Enviro400 MMC is also built on the Scania N250UD chassis. These are notable for having no rear lower deck window; this is due to the mounting of the radiator above the engine.

Orders for Scanias with Enviro400 MMC bodies have been received from the Stagecoach Group. Eleven were delivered to Stagecoach Merseyside & South Lancashire in 2017 for long-distance services between Liverpool and Preston, while 21 Scania Enviro400 MMCs, the first buses delivered new in Stagecoach's revised 'Long Distance' livery, were delivered to Stagecoach West in 2021 for services in Gloucester. Enviro400 MMC-bodied Scanias also entered service with Stagecoach South East and Stagecoach East, with four delivered to the latter with guide wheels for the Cambridgeshire Busway.

Seven Scania N250UDs with Enviro400 MMC bodies were introduced to First Essex in 2020 to upgrade Airlink services connecting both Southend and Stansted airports to double-deck operation. First West of England also operate a number of diesel Scania Enviro400 MMCs around Bristol, with 12 of these Scanias delivered in 2018 upgrading services connecting the city and Bristol Airport to double-deck operation.

In 2016, Alexander Dennis and Scania launched the Enviro400 CNG, built on the Scania N280UD compressed natural gas-powered chassis, at the Euro Bus Expo. Most Enviro400 CNGs were built with the City body, although some earlier models were delivered with MMC bodies to Reading Buses.

=== Volvo Enviro400 MMC ===
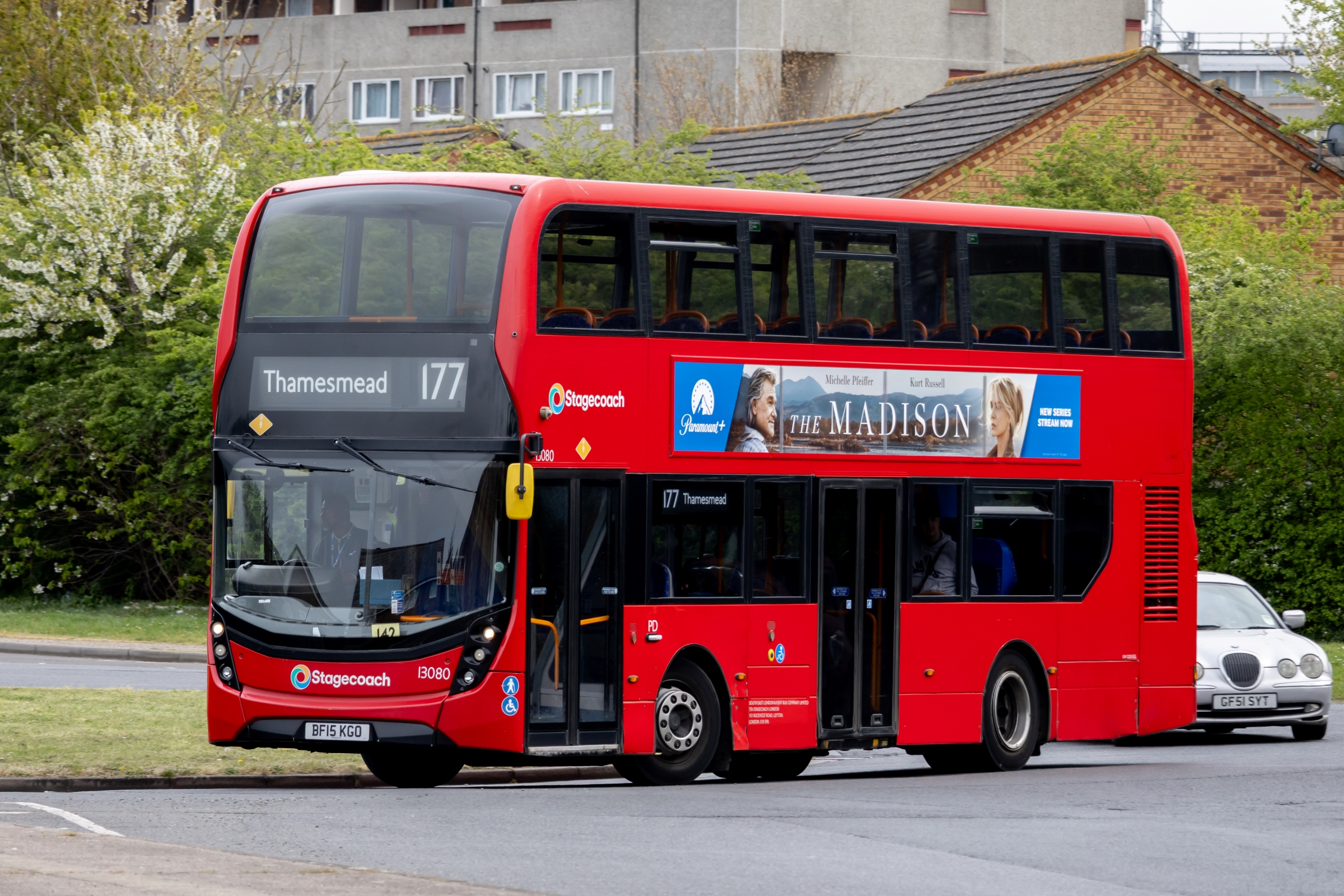
A Stagecoach London Enviro400 MMC-bodied Volvo B5LH in April 2026

A number of Enviro400 MMCs have been built on Volvo's hybrid electric B5LH and conventional diesel B5TL chassis.

The first 13 Enviro400 MMCs bodied on the Volvo B5LH hybrid chassis were delivered to Stagecoach Strathtay in 2015, who uniquely employed conductors aboard the buses allocated to the 'Tayway 73' service - which runs from Arbroath to Ninewells Hospital. Further orders for Enviro400 MMCs on the B5LH chassis in 2015 were taken by Stagecoach London, who had 40 B5LHs delivered in two batches, and Go-Ahead London, who took on 16 B5LHs.

Lothian Buses took delivery of 98 Volvo B5TLs with Enviro400 MMC bodies between 2021 and 2022, so far being the only operator to order Enviro400 MMCs built onto a conventional diesel 2-axle Volvo chassis.

== See also ==
- List of buses
