= Listed buildings in Carnforth =

Carnforth is a civil parish in Lancaster, Lancashire, England. It contains 20 listed buildings that are recorded in the National Heritage List for England. Of these, three are at Grade II*, the middle grade, and the others are at Grade II, the lowest grade. Until the coming of the railway in the middle of the 19th century the parish contained what was then the village of Carnforth, and was otherwise rural. By the later part of the century it had become an important railway junction, linking the south of England with Carlisle, Barrow-in-Furness, and Leeds. There are seven listed buildings associated with the railway and, in addition, a signal box moved from another site. The Lancaster Canal passes through the parish, and two bridges crossing it are listed. The other listed buildings include houses, a farmhouse, a farm building, a public house, a church, and a milestone.

== Key ==
Grade	Criteria
II*	Particularly important buildings of more than special interest
II	Buildings of national importance and special interest

== Buildings ==
Name and location	Photograph	Date	Notes	Grade
10 North Road; 54.12716°N 2.76885°W	—	1688	A pebbledashed house with stone dressings and a slate roof, in two storeys and three bays. There is a continuous hood mould on each floor that rises above the openings. The windows are mullioned, and above the doorway is a shaped lintel with initials and the date.	II
Plane Tree House; 15 North Road; 54.12719°N 2.76699°W	—	1712	A pebbledashed house with a modern tiled roof. It has two storeys and a two-bay front with a central gabled porch. Most of the windows are mullioned and there is one sash window.	II
Shovel Inn; North Road; 54.12794°N 2.76578°W		1750	A public house in pebbledashed stone with a slate roof. It has two storeys, and consists of a main block and a gabled wing. The windows have plain surrounds and are sashes. Above the doorway is a plain lintel inscribed with the date.	II
Hagg Farmhouse and Cottages; Shore Road; 54.13340°N 2.77466°W		1638	The farmhouse and two adjoining cottages to the left are in undressed limestone with a slate roof. The farmhouse comprises two storeys and an attic, and is in a T-shaped plan. Most of the windows are mullioned, except for the two sash windows in the dining room, which also have internal shutters. In the cottages the windows are sashes.	II
Carnforth House; North Road; 54.12915°N 2.76421°W	—	1755	A stone house with a slate roof, in two storeys and three bays. There are lower extensions on each side. The central doorway and the windows have plain surrounds, and the windows are sashes. On the front of the house is a dated plaque.	II
Thwaite End Bridge, Lancaster Canal, off Lancaster Road (Bridge No 127); 54.12002°N 2.77590°W		1797	This an accommodation bridge over the Lancaster Canal. It is in gritstone, and consists of a single semi-elliptical arch with raised keystones and a round-topped parapet.	II
Hodgson's Bridge, Lancaster Canal, off North Road (Bridge No 129); 54.12835°N 2.76177°W		1797	This an accommodation bridge over the Lancaster Canal. It is in gritstone, and consists of a single semi-elliptical arch with raised keystones and a round-topped parapet.	II
Milestone at 97 Lancaster Road; 54.12451°N 2.77269°W	—	c. 1800	The milestone is on the east side of the A6 road. It is in sandstone and has a triangular section and a semicircular base. Originally with two cast iron plates, only that on the right side remains, and this is inscribed "Burton IIII Miles".	II
Hodgson's Croft; 116 North Road; 54.12965°N 2.76222°W	—	Early 19th century	A house in stone and cobble with a slate roof, incorporating some 17th-century material. It has two storeys and three bays. The central doorway and the windows have plain surrounds, and the windows are sashes. At the rear is a later outshut.	II
Hall Gowan; 129 North Road; 54.13029°N 2.76099°W	—	Early to mid 19th century	A pebbledashed house with sandstone dressings and quoins, and a slate roof. There are two storeys and three bays. The windows are sashes, and on the right side is a canted bay window. Above the doorway is a re-set battlemented and inscribed lintel.	II
Barn, Mount Pleasant Farm; Mount Pleasant Lane; 54.11413°N 2.77975°W	—	1836	The barn is in sandstone with a slate roof. It is built on a slope and has two storeys on its west side, which contains a variety of openings and a decorative plaque incorporating the date. On the gable ends are ventilation slits and owl holes, and each gable has an apex finial.	II
Christ Church; Lancaster Road; 54.12798°N 2.76817°W		1875	The church was designed by Brade and Smales, the north aisle was added in 1900, and the tower in 1908. It is in sandstone with a slate roof, and consists of a nave, aisles, transepts, a chancel and a southwest tower. The tower is in three stages with buttresses, and contains a doorway, a clock face, and has a battlemented parapet with corner gargoyles. On the top is a pyramidal roof.	II
Signal box, platform, Carnforth Station; 54.13090°N 2.77138°W		1882	The signal box is in York stone with sandstone dressings and a slate roof. It has two storeys, with blocked windows in the lower storey and mullioned and transomed windows in the upper storey. Rising from the south gable is a tall round chimney with an octagonal base and a decorated cap. On the north side is a panel carved with the Cavendish coat of arms. The signal box closed in 1903.	II
Carnforth Station Junction Signal Box; 54.13166°N 2.77172°W	—	1903	The signal box was built for the Furness Railway. It has a brick base, a glazed operating room, and a Welsh slate roof. The base contains five panels, each with a one-light window.	II
Former wagon repair workshop near Carnforth Station; 54.12884°N 2.77380°W	—	After 1903	The former wagon repair workshop is built in brick with some engineering brick, and consists of two parallel ranges. One has 13 bays and acted as the repair area; the other has five bays and contains a store room and forge.	II
Selside signal box near Carnforth Station; 54.13075°N 2.77226°W	—	1907	The signal box was moved to its present position in 1976 from Selside on the Settle-Carlisle Line. It has a square plan, a weatherboarded base, an observation room with windows, and a Welsh slate roof with a finial.	II
Coaling plant near Carnforth Station; 54.12987°N 2.77295°W		1938–44	The coaling plant was built for the London, Midland and Scottish Railway and constructed using Italian prisoners of war. It is in reinforced concrete, and contains mechanism for lifting coal trucks to a hopper, from which six tenders can be filled simultaneously.	II*
Engine running shed, ancillary buildings and turntable near Carnforth Station; 54.13105°N 2.77303°W	—	1938–44	The engine shed is built in reinforced concrete and has a roof of asbestos sheeting. It contains six roads, and there are ancillary workshops on the east side, and a turntable to the north.	II*
Water Tower near Carnforth Station; 54.12972°N 2.77347°W	—	1939	An iron structure of posts and cross-ties carries a tank with a capacity of 175.100 imperial gallons (796.02 L; 210.286 US gal). The tanks is constructed in small panels, and has an elliptical-shaped roof.	II
Ash plant near Carnforth Station; 54.13027°N 2.77283°W		1939–43	The ash plant was built for the London, Midland and Scottish Railway and constructed using Italian prisoners of war. It is in reinforced concrete, and contains mechanism for raising the ash bin and storing the ash in the tower. It is the last of its type to survive in Britain.	II*
