= Carnforth War Memorial =

- England
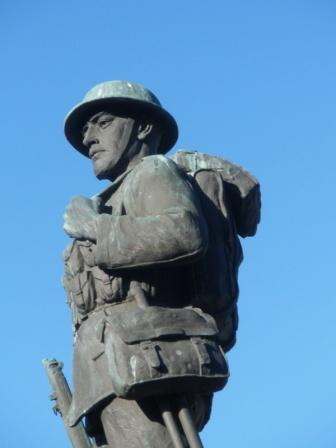
- For Carnforth military dead of World War I and World War II
- Unveiled: 9 November 1924
- Location: 54.12924°N 2.76942°W near Carnforth, Lancashire

The Carnforth War Memorial was erected on 9 November 1924, to commemorate servicemen from Carnforth, Lancashire, who died during and after World War I.

== Design ==
The memorial is located on Market Street, Carnforth, in a small memorial garden, and comprises a square granite plinth upon which stands a bronze figure of a soldier, standing at ease and with rifle. In addition to the bronze figure there are three inscribed plaques. The first commemorates the Carnforth servicemen who died during World War I, the second commemorates the Carnforth servicemen who died whilst still in service between 1918 and 1924 while the third plaque commemorates the Carnforth service personnel who died during and after World War II.

A total of seventy seven names are inscribed on the memorial, fifty seven of which are recorded as killed during or as a consequence of wounds suffered during World War I, and twenty names are recorded as killed during or as a consequence of wounds suffered during World War II.

The inscription is:

TO THE HONOURED MEMORY / OF THE MEN OF / CARNFORTH / WHO DIED AFTER THE CLOSE / OF THE 1939–1945 WAR / FROM THE EFFECTS OF / WAR SERVICE

== Recent history ==
A silent black and white film of the unveiling of the Carnforth's War Memorial in 1924 is available on DVD from North West Film Archive, due to a donation of the film to the King's Own Royal Regiment Museum in Lancaster in 2004. The process of converting the film to DVD was delicate as the film is "highly volatile nitrate film". The 6 minute film, which records the event attended by dignitaries, servicemen and families, was produced by the Carnforth 'Kinema' owner, William J. Weeks.
