= Hame, Debar =

Hame Хаме Amë
- Village
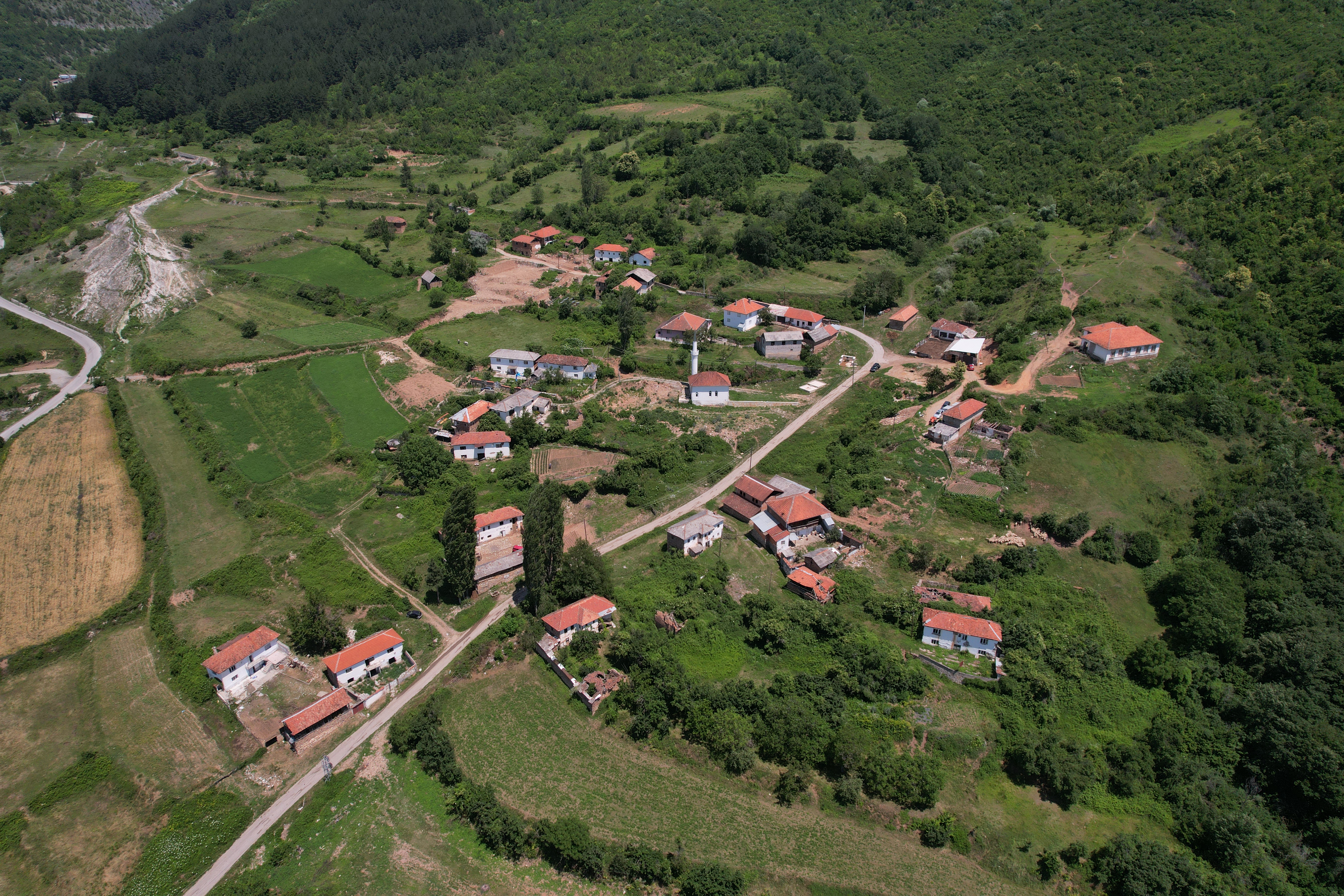
- Airview of the village

- Location within North Macedonia
- Coordinates: 41°33′N 20°32′E
- Country: North Macedonia
- Region: Southwestern
- Municipality: Debar

Population (2021)
  - Total: 19
- Time zone: UTC+1 (CET)
  - Summer (DST): UTC+2 (CEST)
- Car plates: DB
- Website: .

Hame (Macedonian: Хаме, Albanian: Amë) is a village in the municipality of Debar, North Macedonia.

== Demographics ==
Hame (Hame) is recorded in the Ottoman defter of 1583 as a neighborhood in the city of Rahovnik, in the vilayet of Upper Debar. The settlement had a total of 39 households, of whom 25 were Christian and 14 Muslim. The Christian anthroponymy attested was mostly Slavic in character, with a minority of Albanian anthroponyms that appear also displaying instances of Slavicisation (e.g., Jovan Prishleshi; Ivanko Husha; etc.).

As of the 2021 census, Hame had 19 residents with the following ethnic composition:

- Persons for whom data are taken from administrative sources 15
- Albanians 4

According to the 2002 census, the village had a total of 135 inhabitants. Ethnic groups in the village include:

- Albanians 135
