= Stagecoach Cumbria and Lancashire =

Bus operator in North West England

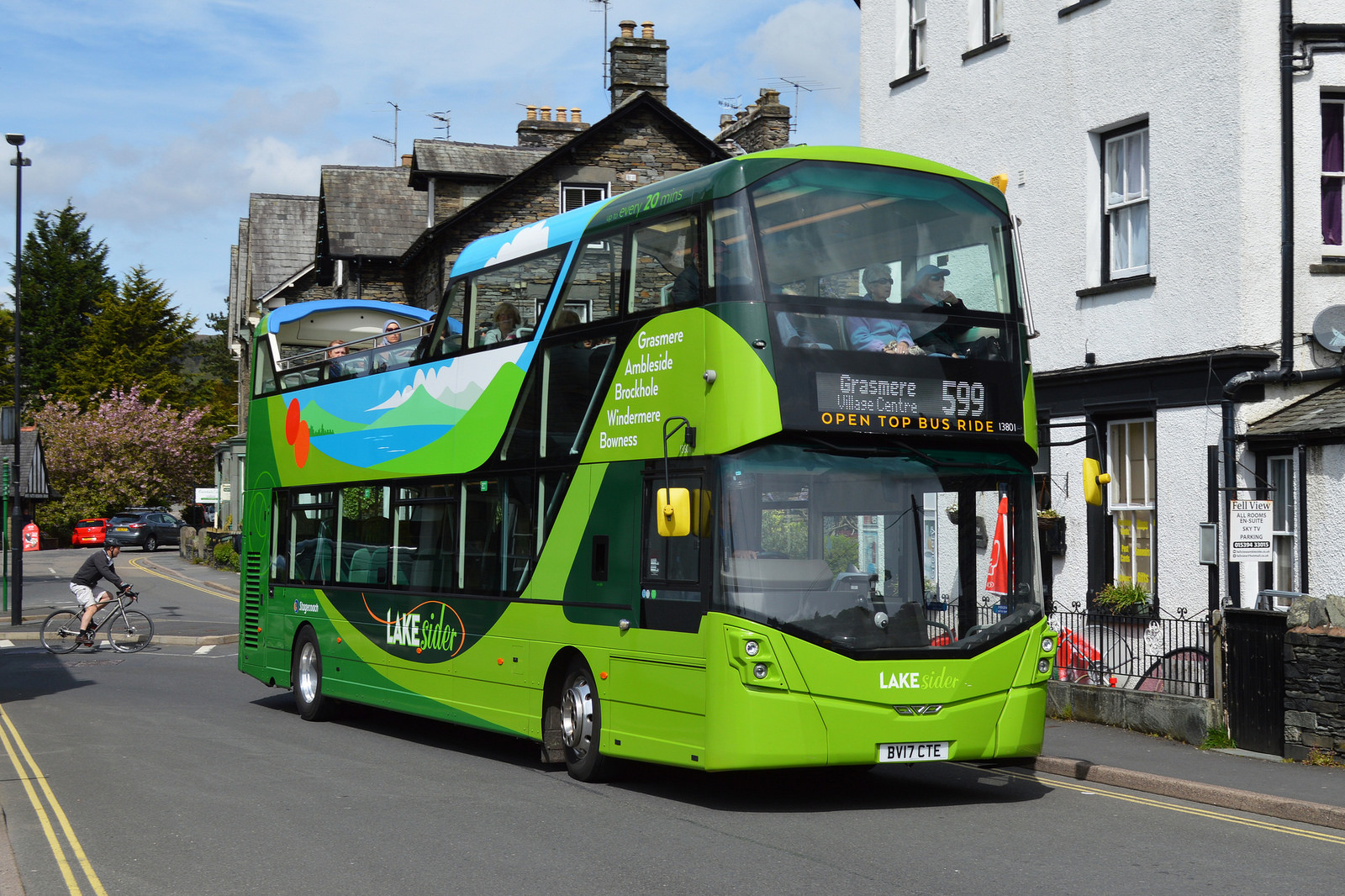
- 'Lakesider' branded Wright Gemini 3 bodied Volvo B5TL open top bus in Ambleside in May 2018
- Parent: Stagecoach Group
- Founded: 2011; 15 years ago (Note: The company previously operated as two separate entities: Stagecoach in Cumbria and Stagecoach in Lancashire.)
- Headquarters: Carlisle, Cumbria; England
- Service area: Cumbria; Dumfries and Galloway; Lancashire; Northumberland; Merseyside; Tyne and Wear
- Service type: Bus services
- Depots: 7
- Website: www.stagecoachbus.com/about/cumbria-and-north-lancashire

Stagecoach (North West) Limited trading as Stagecoach Cumbria and Lancashire operates both local and regional bus services in Cumbria, Lancashire, Northumberland and Tyne and Wear, England, as well as Dumfries and Galloway, Scotland. It is a subsidiary of the Stagecoach Group, which operates bus and coach services across the United Kingdom.

== History ==
The company has its origins in the purchase of Cumberland Motor Services and Ribble Motor Services from the National Bus Company in the late 1980s.

The company's head office is based in Carlisle. It was previously known as Stagecoach North West until 1 September 2011, when Stagecoach Merseyside amalgamated with Chorley and Preston depots to form Stagecoach Merseyside and South Lancashire.

In December 2025, the Chorley and Preston depots were transferred back to the company, which then traded as Stagecoach in Cumbria and Lancashire.

== Overview ==
Stagecoach Cumbria and Lancashire predominantly operates commercial bus services in Cumbria and Lancashire, with some services extending into Dumfries and Galloway (79 and 179), as well as Northumberland and Tyne and Wear (685). The company also operate several contracted services on behalf of Cumberland Council, Westmorland and Furness Council and Lancashire County Council.

=== Stagecoach in Cumbria ===
Stagecoach in Cumbria was a trading name of Stagecoach North West Limited, and predominantly operates services in Cumbria. The company has been formerly known as Barrow Borough Transport, Stagecoach Cumberland and Stagecoach Ribble.

Cumberland Motor Services was one of the first National Bus Company subsidiaries to be privatised in 1986; this was almost immediately after gaining the Penrith and Carlisle depots from Ribble. The company was bought from the NBC by Stagecoach in July 1987, who split it into two territories: CMS Carlislebus for services within Carlisle itself and CMS Cumberland for the rest of the services; eventually, both territories merged with Ribble's south Cumbria services to become Stagecoach Cumberland.

In 2005, the company commenced operation of Cumbria County Council-secured service X35, which ran between Barrow-in-Furness and Kendal via Ulverston and Grange-over-Sands. In July 2012, funding was withdrawn and the service was taken over commercially by Stagecoach. At the same time, the service was renumbered X6 and the route was diverted away from Westmorland General Hospital.

In July 2016, a fleet of twelve Alexander Dennis Enviro400 MMC double-deck vehicles were introduced on service 555, which runs between Keswick and Lancaster via Grasmere – an investment totalling £2.5 million.

In July 2017, a fleet of open-top Dennis Trident/Alexander ALX400 were replaced by new Volvo B5TL/Wright Gemini 3. Branded in the two-tone green Lakesider livery, the vehicles operate on service 599 - branded as "Lakesider" by Stagecoach - between Bowness-on-Windermere and Grasmere via Windermere and Ambleside, with occasional early/late connections to the depot in Kendal.

In April 2023, service 555 was renewed with a brand new fleet of nine Alexander Dennis Enviro400 MMC double-deck vehicles. (Note: The new buses will not be used on journeys operated via the M6, as said by Stagecoach in the Lakes by Bus PDF in small print under "One day adventures on the 555" section.) This investment totalled £3 million, and saw seven vehicles from the existing fleet of similar vehicles dating from 2016, cascaded to Barrow depot to operate services 6 and X6, between Barrow-in-Furness, Ulverston, and Windermere or Kendal, and the remaining five down to Morecambe.

The company were often frequently criticised for charging high fares – especially when comparing the cost of single journeys to London.

=== Stagecoach in Lancaster ===
Stagecoach in Lancaster was the trading name of Stagecoach North West Limited's operations from its Morecambe depot, including Stagecoach Ribble services, as well as those formerly operated by Lancaster City Transport – a municipal bus operator which ceased trading in 1993.

During 2018/2019, 32 new Alexander Dennis Enviro 400MMC arrived into Morecambe depot for routes 1/1A as well the 100/2X. 18 were introduced in 2018 with a further 14 introduced during 2019. This was an investment of £7 million.

== Fleet and operations ==
=== Depots ===
As of December 2025, the company operates from seven bus depots across the region: Barrow-in-Furness, Carlisle, Kendal, Morecambe, Preston, Chorley and Workington (Lillyhall), as well as two outstations: Catterall and Penrith. An outstation at Ingleton was closed in 2022, following the withdrawal of services 80 and 81 which is now run by Kirkby Lonsdale Coach hire.

=== Vehicles ===
The fleet consists mainly of diesel-powered single and double-deck buses manufactured by Alexander Dennis, Optare, Volvo and Wrightbus. Some double-deck vehicles are open-top, including a fleet of Volvo B5TL/Wright Gemini 3 vehicles, which operate within the Lake District National Park.

== Branding ==
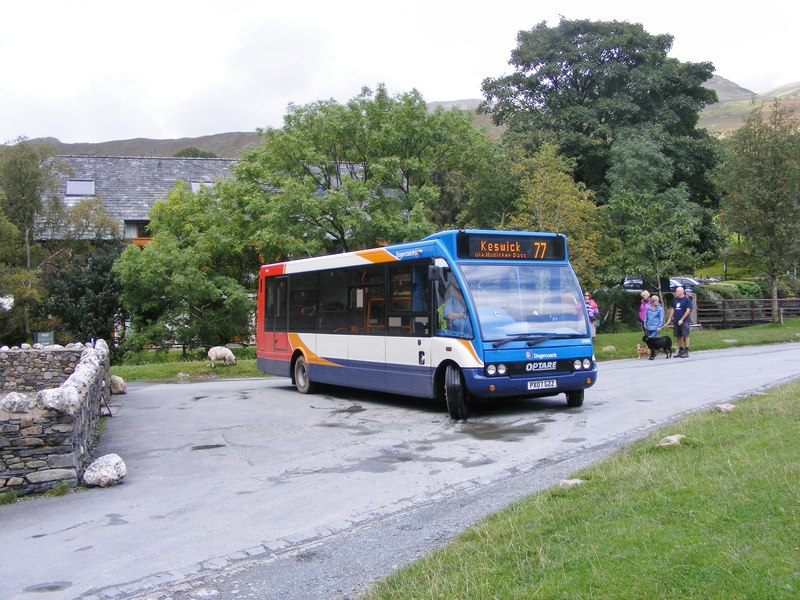
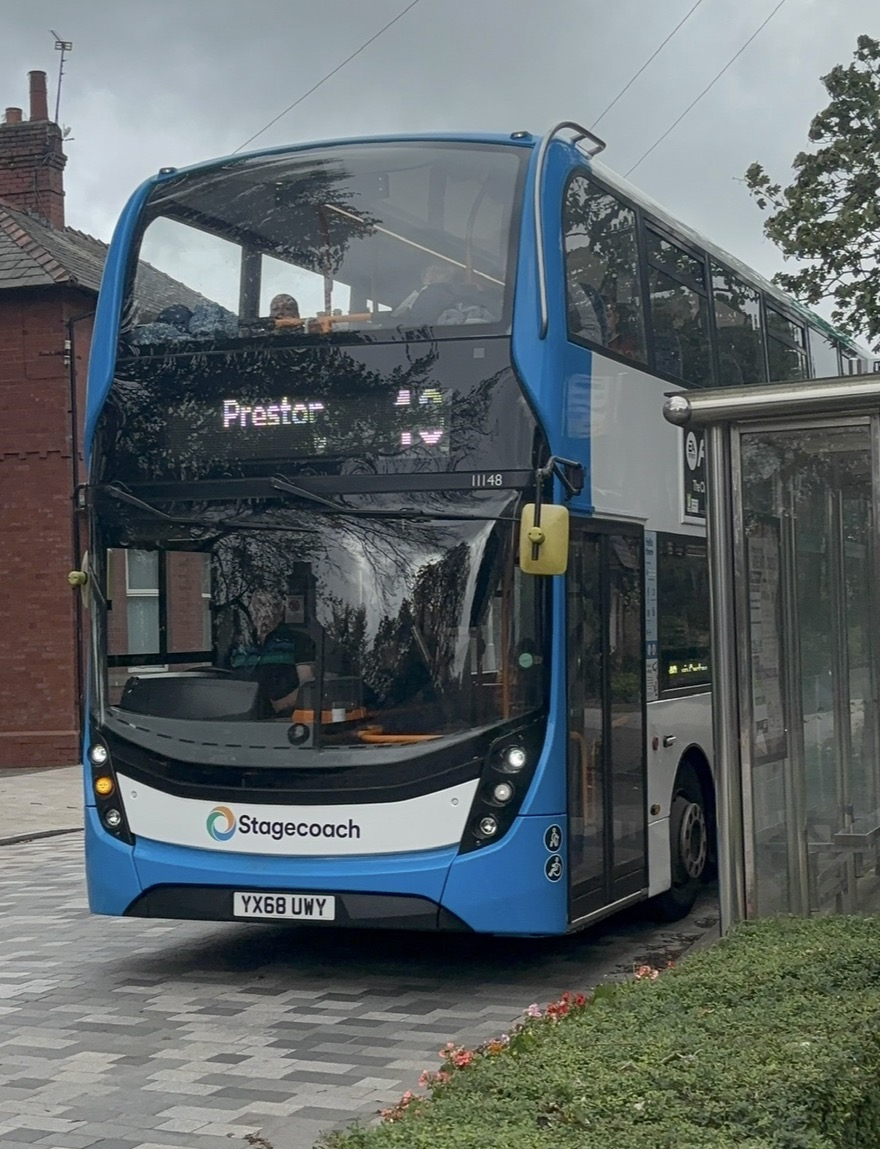
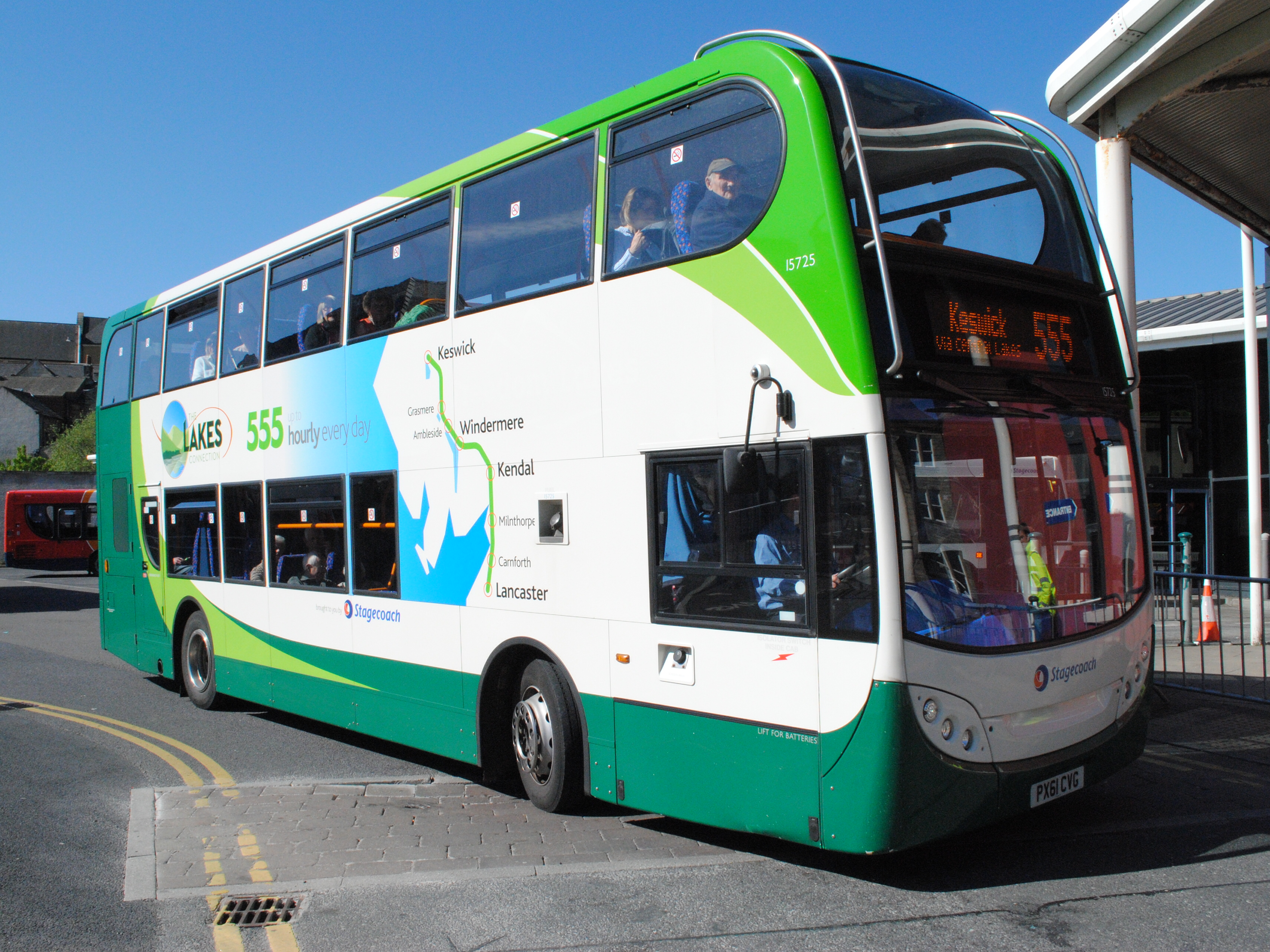
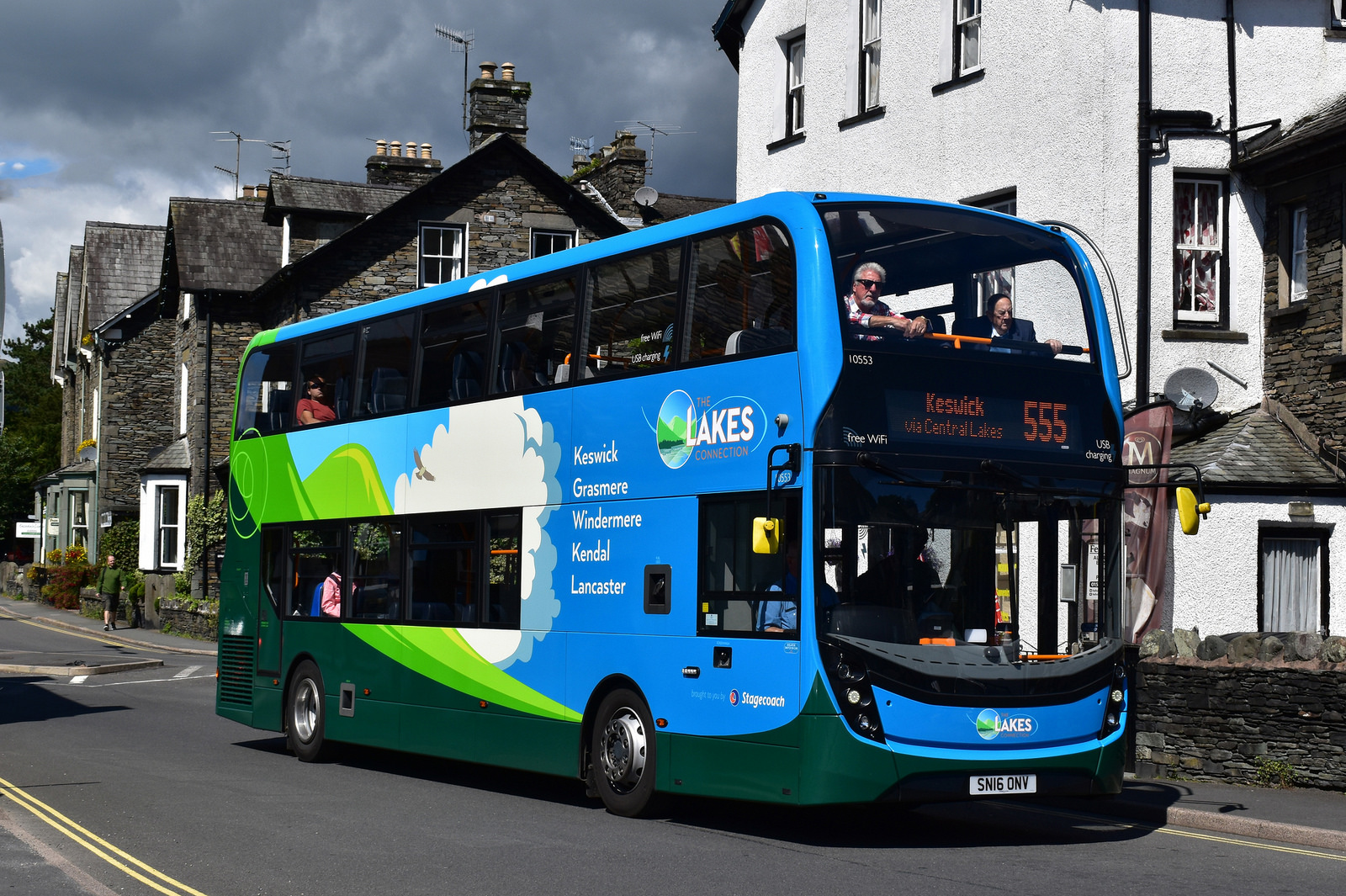
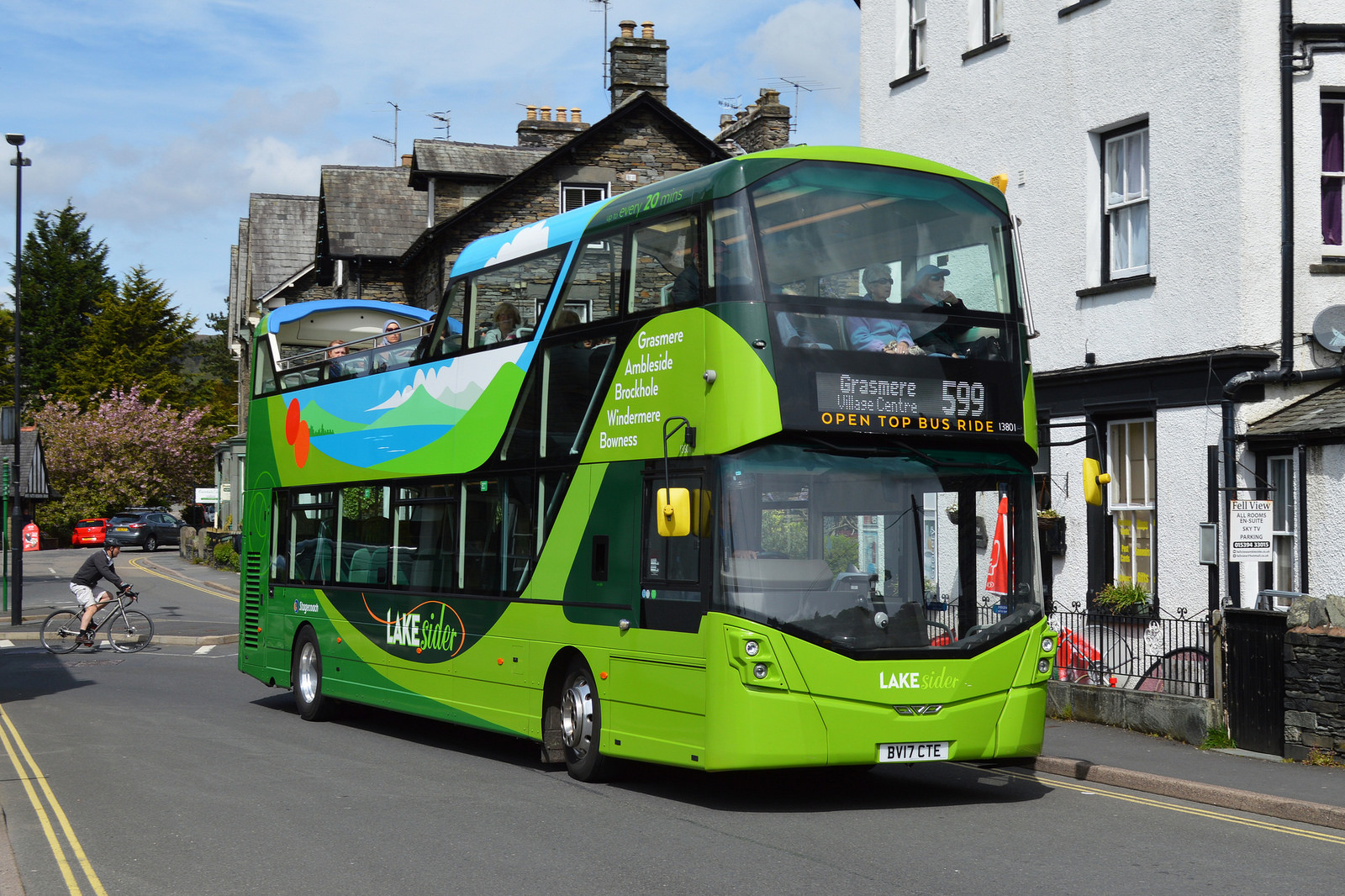
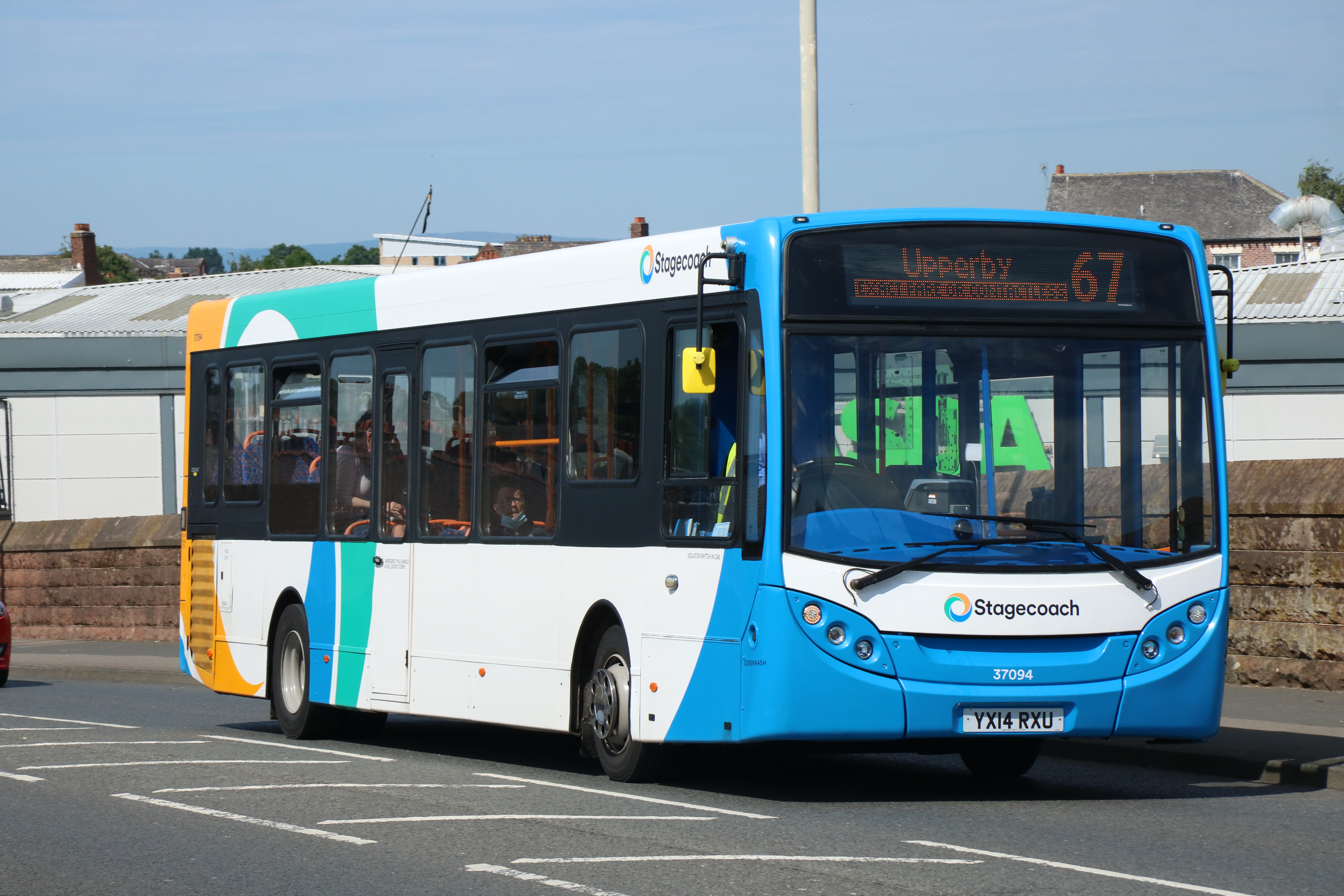
Branding: past and present

As of June 2026, vehicles in the fleet are in the process of being rebranded into the new fleet livery, which was revealed in April 2025. It consists of a steel blue exterior look featuring the company's updated logo. The livery name is "Stagecoach We’ve got you".

The former livery was “Stagecoach Local” introduced in 2020 before that over 20 years of “Stagecoach Beachball” Livery the consisted of vehicles painted in a white base, with a blue skirt, and red and orange swoops.

Although the Lakes Connection livery was initially used exclusively on service 555, the 2020 Stagecoach group-wide rebrand has seen this livery implemented on all buses based at Kendal, as well as a select number based at Carlisle, Morecambe and Workington. Central Lakes open top service 599 is branded as Lakesider, whilst service 78 linking Keswick and Seatoller, is branded as The Borrowdale Bus.
