= Carnforth =

Town in Lancashire, England

Coordinates: 54.123°N 2.766°W

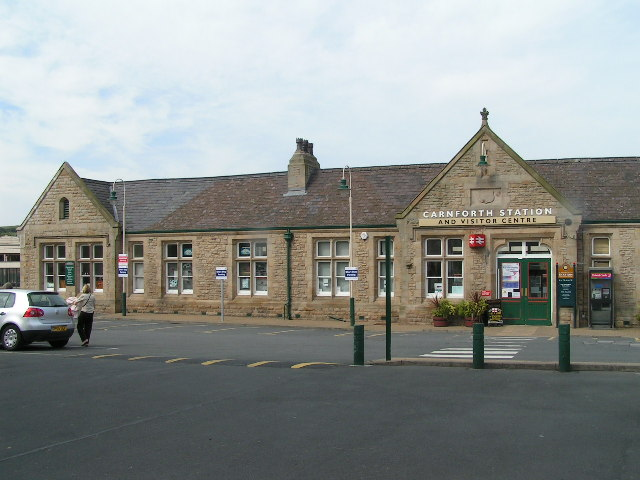
- Carnforth station in 2005

- Shown within the City of Lancaster district Location within Lancashire
- Population: 5,521 (2021)
- OS grid reference: SD499704
- Civil parish: Carnforth
- District: Lancaster
- Shire county: Lancashire
- Region: North West
- Country: England
- Sovereign state: United Kingdom
- Post town: CARNFORTH
- Postcode district: LA5
- Dialling code: 01524
- Police: Lancashire
- Fire: Lancashire
- Ambulance: North West
- UK Parliament: Morecambe and Lunesdale

Carnforth is a market town and civil parish in the City of Lancaster in Lancashire, England, situated at the north-east end of Morecambe Bay. The parish of Carnforth had a population of 5,521 in the 2021 census and 5,560 in the 2011 census, an increase from the 5,350 recorded in the 2001 census. The town is situated around 7 miles north of Lancaster, 17 miles south of Kendal, 40 miles east (bisected by Morecambe Bay) of Barrow-in-Furness and 28 miles north-west of Settle. The town is also close to the Cumbria/Lancashire border.

Carnforth grew in the 19th century through the presence of the railway and ironworks. Due to the closeness of the coast and the hills, Carnforth is a popular base for walkers and cyclists exploring the area. The River Keer, the West Coast Main Line (WCML), the A6 and the Lancaster Canal pass through the town. The M6 motorway passes just to the east, linked to Carnforth by the A6070 (formerly the A601(M)) which was originally part of the Lancaster bypass before the M6 was extended north.

== History ==
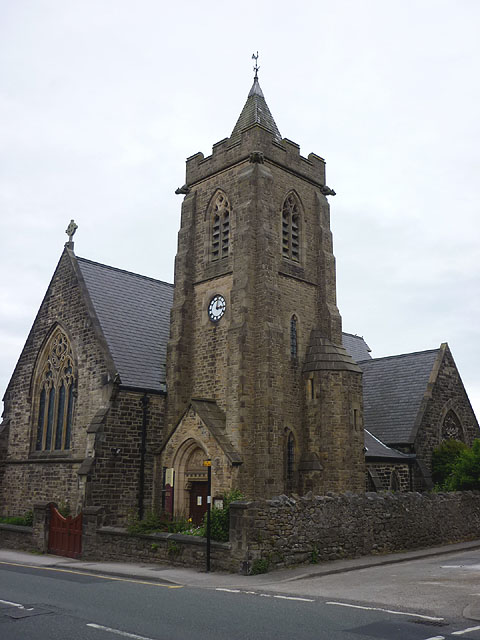
Christ Church

The name Carnforth is thought to derive from its old function as a ford of the River Keer on which it is situated. Over time, the descriptive name Keer-ford may have morphed into the modern Carnforth. An alternative explanation is that the name derives from 'Chreneforde' and is Anglo-Saxon in origin, as cited in the Victoria County History of Lancashire. Another explanation is that it derives from the Old English cranford meaning 'crane ford'.

Much of the history of Carnforth revolves around the railway and ironworks. Vast deposits of limestone located locally made Carnforth an ideal place for an ironworks, as limestone is a key component of the smelting process. In 1846, the Carnforth Ironworks Company established a works near to the railway station. In the same year, a recession occurred in the Earl of Dudley ironworks in Worcestershire, which meant there was a surplus of workers. A number of workers moved to the ironworks and lived in the nearby company village of Dudley (now called Millhead). In 1864, the Carnforth Haematite Company took over the works and production was vastly increased due to iron ore that was brought in by rail from the Furness Peninsula. By 1872, steel production became the main focus for the works using the new Bessemer process; this process had failed by 1879.

Iron production continued at the works until 1929, when it eventually closed down. The site was taken over by the War Department, as an ordnance depot and remained as such until the 1960s. From then to the present, the site is now an industrial estate housing several businesses.

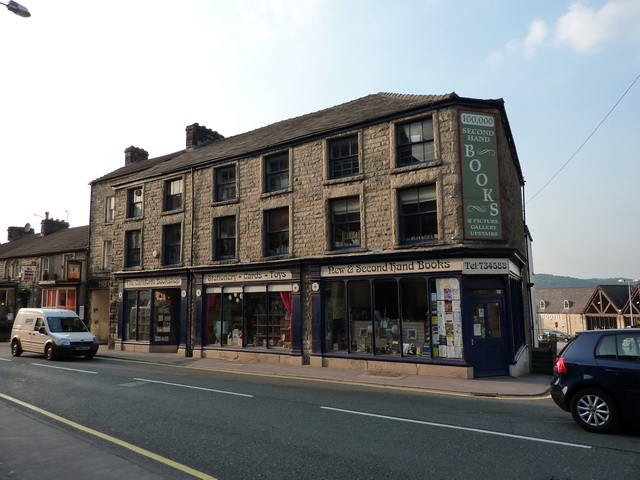
Market Street

In the 19th century, Carnforth grew from a small village into a railway town when it became the junction of three major railways. Carnforth Motive Power Depot was located to the west of the West Coast Main Line and, until mid-1968, was one of the last to retain an allocation of steam locomotives. The buildings are now occupied by West Coast Railways who still maintain and overhaul steam locos in their premises. The concrete locomotive coaling tower is a rare survivor.

With the closure of Carnforth MPD in 1968, the station's facilities were reduced. The main line platforms were closed in May 1970 and subsequently removed when the line was electrified two years later, although services still run on the Furness line and the Bentham Line.

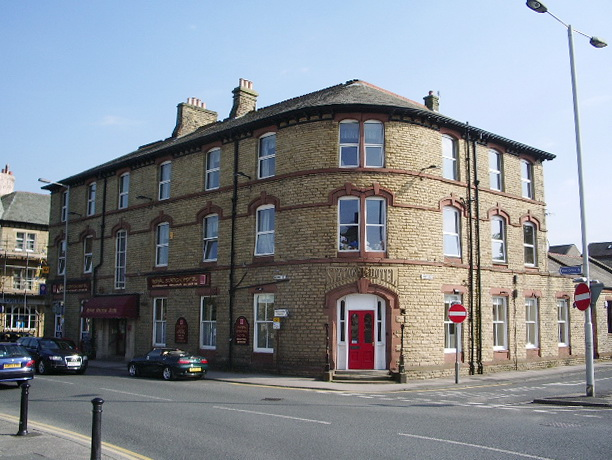
The Royal Station Hotel

From the 1920s to the 1980s, Morphy's Mill, in Oxford Street, was a major employer of women in Carnforth. Contrary to its name, it was not a mill but a factory making blouses and other garments.

== Brief Encounter ==
In 1945, Carnforth railway station was used as a location for the David Lean film Brief Encounter, starring Celia Johnson and Trevor Howard. Fans of this film were one of the major factors in the recent refurbishment of the railway station, including construction of a refreshment room to match the studio set used in the film. This reopened in 2021 as the Brief Encounter Refreshment Room Bistro and Bar. There are also exhibitions and a heritage centre, which is now run by the Carnforth Station Trust. The 2018 novel Past Encounters by local writer Deborah Swift is set, in part, in Carnforth during the filming of Brief Encounter.

Gallery of film locations

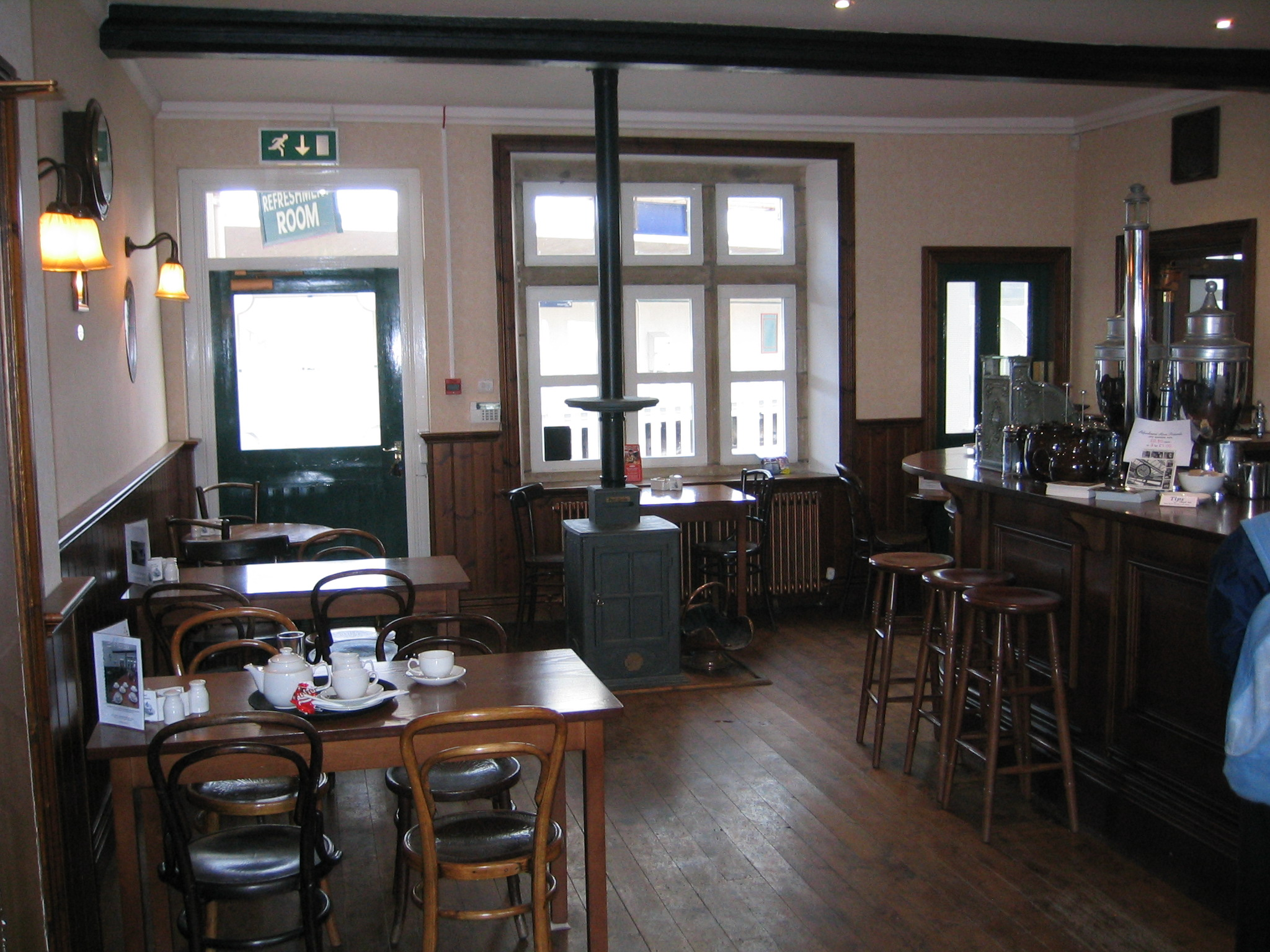
Carnforth railway station refreshment room - scene for much of the film

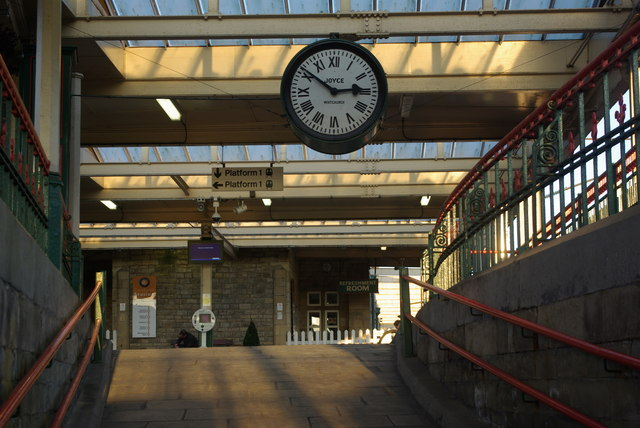
Carnforth railway station clock and ramp from subway under platforms

== Governance ==
An electoral ward in the same name exists. This ward is smaller than the parish with a total population of 4,439.

Carnforth is in the parliamentary constituency of Morecambe and Lunesdale, represented since 2024 by Lizzi Collinge of the Labour Party.

== Geography ==
The River Keer runs through the north-north-west of the town with the mouth of the river flowing into Morecambe Bay. It forms the parish boundary between Carnforth and Warton. A bridge between Carnforth and Millhead is the lowest road crossing of the river, although there is a footbridge a little further downstream.

== Demography ==
The Office for National Statistics recognises an area described as Carnforth Built-up area, defined algorithmically, which includes Carnforth and Warton. It is divided into two parts: Carnforth subdivision, which includes the Millhead area within Warton parish, and Warton subdivision. The ONS definition of a built-up area includes built-up land separated by 200m from another settlement.

2011 Census
Named area	Population	Area	Population density	Note
Carnforth civil parish	5,560	6.09 km^{2} (2.35 sq mi)	910/km^{2} (2,400/sq mi)	
Carnforth ward	4,439	5.33 km^{2} (2.06 sq mi)	830/km^{2} (2,100/sq mi)	Excludes Crag Bank area
Carnforth Built-up area	7,920	2.33 km^{2} (0.90 sq mi)	3,400/km^{2} (8,800/sq mi)	Comprises Carnforth and Warton Built-up area subdivisions
Carnforth Built-up area subdivision	6,115	1.75 km^{2} (0.68 sq mi)	3,480/km^{2} (9,000/sq mi)	Includes Millhead area
Warton Built-up area subdivision	1,805	0.575 km^{2} (0.222 sq mi)	3,140/km^{2} (8,100/sq mi)	Excludes Millhead area

== Health service ==
There is a general practice surgery in the town, with eleven partners and four associate GPs. It has smaller surgeries in Arnside, Bolton-le-Sands, Halton, and Silverdale, to serve patients in outlying villages. It is within the North Lancashire clinical commissioning group and patients are served by the University Hospitals of Morecambe Bay NHS Foundation Trust.

There is also an NHS clinic, adjacent to the GP practice, used for a variety of services.

== Transport ==
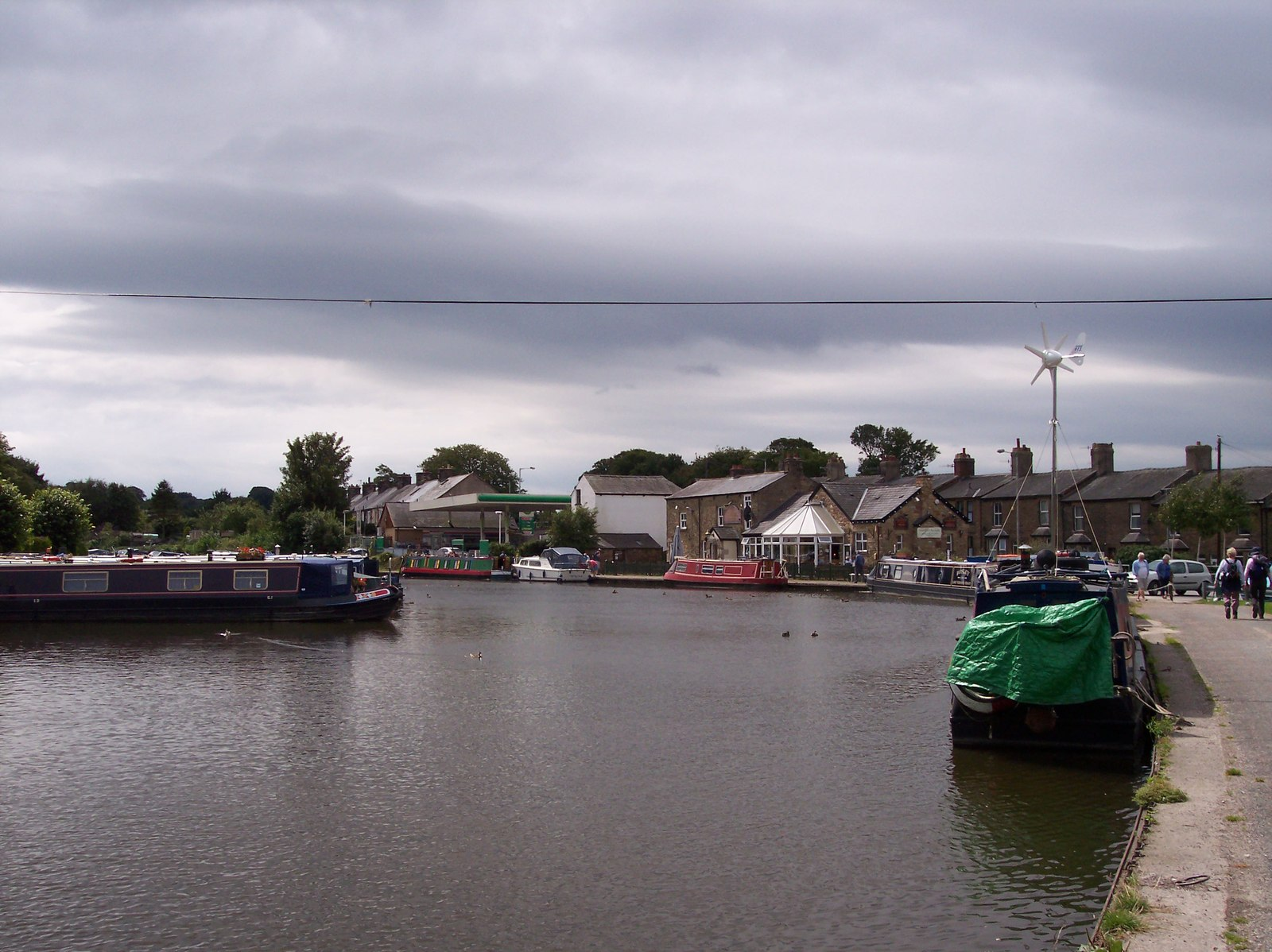
The Lancaster Canal at Carnforth

=== Train ===
Carnforth railway station is served by Northern Trains on three lines:

- Bentham Line: Services operate between Leeds and Morecambe, via Skipton
- Furness line: Trains link Manchester Airport with Barrow-in-Furness, via Lancaster. Some trains continue to Carlisle, via Whitehaven
- Morecambe Branch Line: A single daily parliamentary train service travels to Morecambe, via the north curve at Hest Bank.

The West Coast Main Line passes through the station, but Avanti West Coast and TransPennine Express trains do not stop here; passengers must travel south to Lancaster or north to Oxenholme for destinations between London Euston, Manchester Airport (Southbound) and Glasgow Central and Edinburgh (Northbound).

=== Buses ===
Bus services in the town are provided by Stagecoach Cumbria and North Lancashire and Kirkby Lonsdale Buses. Routes connect the town with Lancaster and Morecambe to the south, and to Milnthorpe, Kendal and Keswick in the north. The 555 bus, which connects Lancaster with Keswick, is described as one of the longest and most scenic bus routes in England.

=== Road ===
Carnforth is on the A6 road 7 miles (11 km) north of Lancaster. The M6 motorway passes to the east of the town; the A6070 road and the B6254 road connect the town centre to junction 35.

=== Canal ===
The Lancaster Canal passes through the town; there is a marina for pleasure boats. Historically, the canal connected Lancaster to Kendal, but it is now closed beyond Tewitfield, north of Carnforth.

=== Walking / Cycling ===
Both the Lancashire Coastal Way and the Bay Cycle Way skirt the western side of Carnforth, crossing the River Keer by the footbridge north-west of the town.

== Media ==
Local TV coverage is provided by BBC North West and ITV Granada. Television signals are received from the Lancaster relay TV transmitter.

Local radio stations are BBC Radio Lancashire, Heart North West, Smooth North West, Greatest Hits Radio Lancashire, and Beyond Radio, a community based station which broadcasts from its studios in Lancaster.

Local newspapers are Lancaster Guardian (formerly The Visitor), The Westmorland Gazette, and Lancashire Evening Post.

== Education ==
Primary schools:

- Carnforth Community Primary School, North Road
- Christ Church C of E Primary School, North Road
- Our Lady of Lourdes Catholic Primary School, Kellet Road

Secondary schools:

- Carnforth High School

There is also a public library branch in the town.

== Religious sites ==
The Anglican parish church of Christ Church, on Lancaster Road, was built in 1875 with later additions, and is a grade II listed building. It worships in the Anglo-Catholic tradition. It is in the Deanery of Tunstall in the Diocese of Blackburn.

Our Lady of Lourdes Catholic church, on Kellet Road, is a small building in modern romanesque style, which opened in 1967; it replaced a temporary church that had opened in 1926. It is a joint parish with St Mary's Church, Yealand Conyers and St Mary's Church, Bolton-le-Sands, in the Roman Catholic Diocese of Lancaster.

Emmanuel Congregational Church, on Hawk Street, was established in 1884 and is a member of the Congregational Federation.

Carnforth Free Methodist Church was established in 1995. It holds services at Carnforth High School on Kellet road and has a community centre adjacent to the school.

The Salvation Army have a church in Preston Street and also run a charity shop on Market Street.

The Jehovah's Witnesses have a Kingdom Hall on the outskirts of Carnforth at Mill Lane, Warton.

== Sport ==
The town is home to Carnforth RUFC rugby union club, Carnforth Rangers football club and Carnforth Cricket Club.

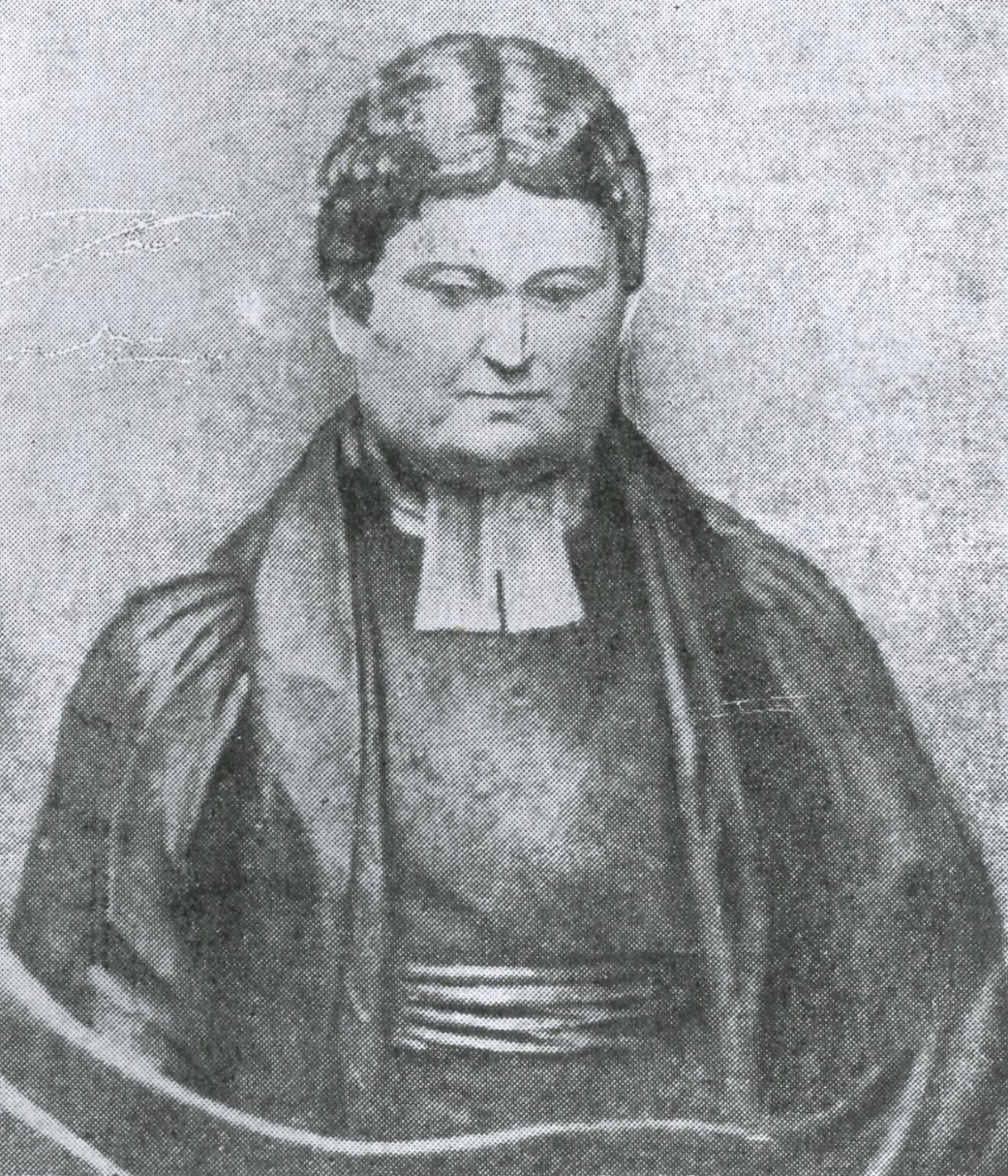
William Cowherd

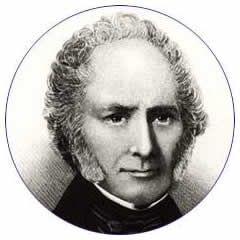
William Sturgeon, pre 1850

== Notable people ==
- Sir Thomas Kitson (1485–1540), wealthy merchant, Sheriff of London and builder of Hengrave Hall, born in Warton.
- William Cowherd (1763–1816), Christian minister and vegetarianism activist.
- William Sturgeon (1783–1850), electrical engineer, made the first electromagnet and a practical electric motor.
- George Marton (1801–1867), politician from Capernwray Hall, MP for Lancaster 1837-1847
- Myers Danson (1845–1909), Dean of Aberdeen and Orkney from 1907 to 1909, born in Carnforth
- Robert Wilson (1878–1916), rugby league player, played 256 games
- Albert Halton (1893–1971), British Army private, recipient of the Victoria Cross
- Cecil Parkinson (1931–2016), Conservative Party MP 1970-1983, became Baron Parkinson of Carnforth in 1992.
- Steve Kemp, (born 1978), drummer of alternative rock band Hard-Fi. attended Carnforth High School.

== See also ==
- Listed buildings in Carnforth
- Carnforth War Memorial
