= 555 (New Zealand telephone number) =

In New Zealand, the number 555 is the national police non-emergency telephone number. The number goes to the New Zealand Police Communication Centre, but is given a lower priority than the 111 emergency number calls.

When called, the police communicator will ask the caller their location, how long ago the incident occurred, the involved vehicle's license plate and what is happening now. The information will be passed to frontline police, but will often only result in a warning letter. Police urge drivers to call 111 for more serious instances such as a serious motor vehicle crash or any instances where life is at risk.
