= Stagecoach bus route 555 =

Scenic bus route in Cumbria and Lancashire, England

The Lakes Connection 555
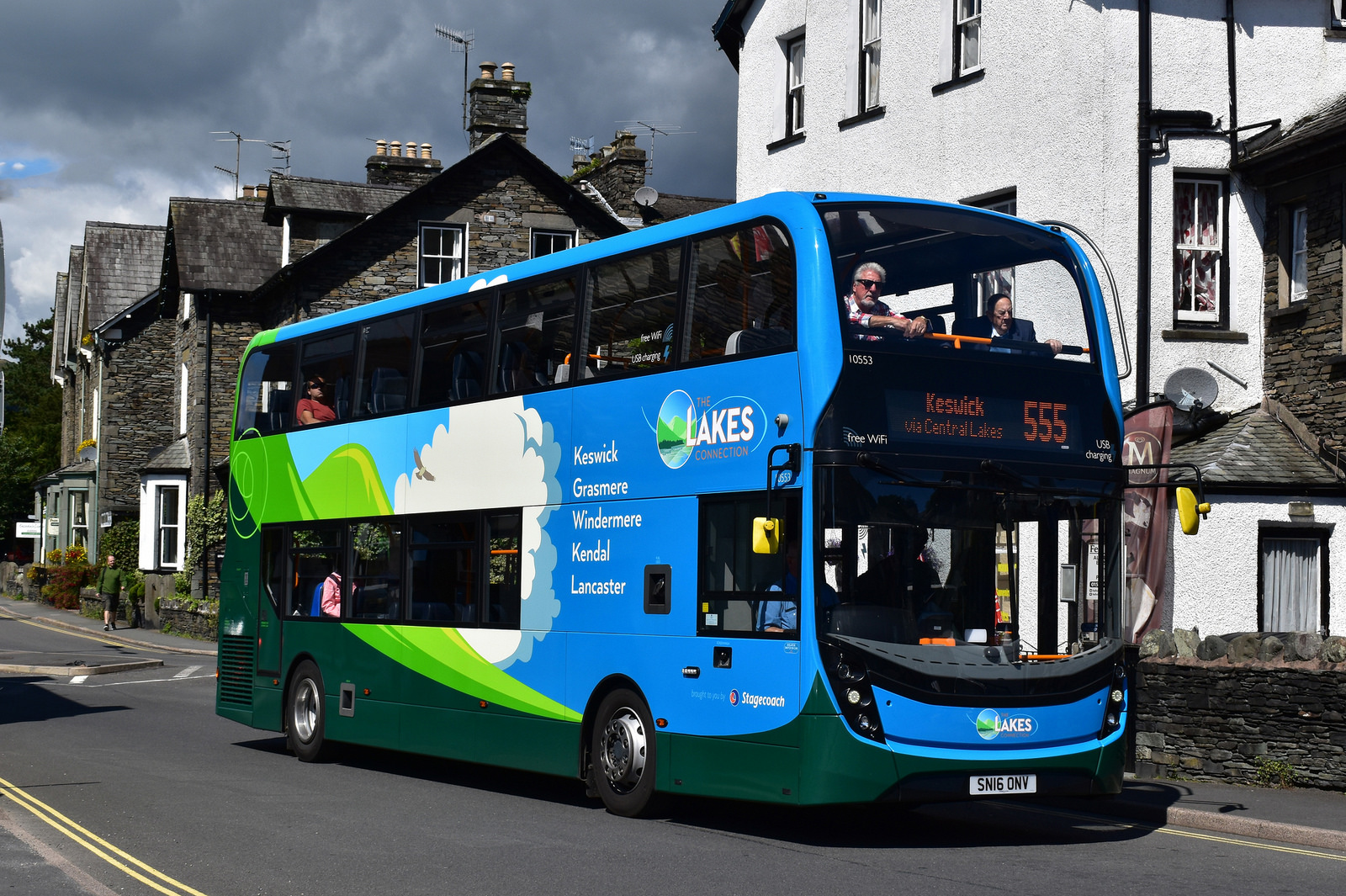

Overview
- Operator: Stagecoach Cumbria & North Lancashire
- Garage: Kendal
- Vehicle: Alexander Dennis Enviro 400 MMC (2016–present)

Route
- Locale: Cumbria; Lancashire
- Termini: Keswick; Kendal; Lancaster
- Length: 45 miles (72 km)

Service
- Frequency: 30–60 minutes (Note: On weekdays and Saturday, services operate hourly (winter)/twice-hourly (summer) during the day, with an hourly service during the evening. On Sunday, services operate hourly between Keswick and Kendal, and two-hourly between Kendal and Lancaster. Some journeys run fast via M6 between Kendal and Lancaster, omitting Milnthorpe, Burton-in-Kendal and Carnforth.)
- Operates: Daily

The Lakes Connection 555 is a bus route operated by Stagecoach Cumbria and North Lancashire in Cumbria and Lancashire, England. The scenic route covers a distance of 45 miles (72 km) and runs between the towns of Keswick and Lancaster via Grasmere, Windermere, (Note: Operates additionally via Bowness-on-Windermere in the early morning and late evening.) Kendal and Carnforth.

== History ==
The route from Lancaster to Keswick was first operated in 1925 by Henry Meageen, and known as the "Westmorland Main Service". For many years it was Ribble Motor Services' route 68, before being renumbered as the 555 in 1969, operated by Cumberland Motor Services and then Stagecoach. A cavalcade of vintage buses celebrated the route's centenary on 14 September 2025.

== Route ==
The route begins in the cathedral city of Lancaster, Lancashire, from where it heads north, serving the village of Bolton-le-Sands, before continuing to the market town of Carnforth. After crossing the Cumbrian county boundary, the route continues through the villages of Holme and Milnthorpe, as well serving the historic Levens Hall, before reaching the market town of Kendal.

North of Kendal, the route largely follows the A591, the main road through the central Lake District. It serves a number of towns and villages, including Staveley, Ings and Windermere, before continuing along the eastern shoreline of Windermere to Ambleside. From Ambleside, the route continues north through the village of Grasmere, passing Rydal Water, Grasmere and Thirlmere. It then descends into the market town of Keswick, where it terminates close to the shores of Derwent Water.

Previously, the route used to extend around 30 miles (48 km) north to Carlisle. The section between Keswick and Carlisle is now served by services 553 (via Caldbeck) (Note: Service 553 operates daily between late March and early November.) and 554 (via Wigton), which connect with service 555 at Keswick.

== Fleet and operations ==
In October 2011, nine double-deck Scania N230UD/Alexander Dennis Enviro400 vehicles were introduced, branded in the two-tone green and white Freedom of the Lakes livery. Each vehicle was named after a famous Lake District mountain. (Note: Vehicles were named Langdale Pike (15721), Catbells (15722), Helm Crag (15723), Helvellyn (15724), Skiddaw (15725), Wansfell Pike (15726), Scafell Pike (15727), Coniston Old Man (15728) and Blencathra (15729).)

In July 2016, twelve double-deck Alexander Dennis Enviro 400 MMC vehicles were introduced, branded in the blue, green and white The Lakes Connection livery.

A further nine double-deck Alexander Dennis Enviro 400 MMC vehicles were introduced in April 2023, replacing the previous fleet. These vehicles feature improved legroom, high-backed seating and tables fitted with wireless chargers.

== Tourism ==
The bus service is popular with tourists as they can see the countryside from the top deck. The route is also popular with walkers. Robert Swain authored a book, "55 555 Walks", that shows walks that could be done from destinations along the whole route in both Lancashire and Cumbria.

The route was included in The Guardian's 2023 list of "10 of the UK's most scenic bus routes", described as "running alongside four famous lakes with views of the surrounding fells".

== Ladies That Bus ==
The play Ladies That Bus was written by Joyce Branagh and based on 400 interviews with users of the 555 route. It was developed in association with the three theatres along the route: The Dukes in Lancaster, the Brewery Arts Centre in Kendal and Theatre by the Lake, Keswick. The show toured in early 2020 before the lockdown caused by the COVID-19 pandemic, and was scheduled to open on 29 September 2020 as one of the first productions at The Dukes as restrictions eased. In January 2021 the Dukes theatre made Ladies That Bus available online through Vimeo, as a response to the lockdown conditions.
