= North Carolina Museum of Art =

Museum in Raleigh, North Carolina

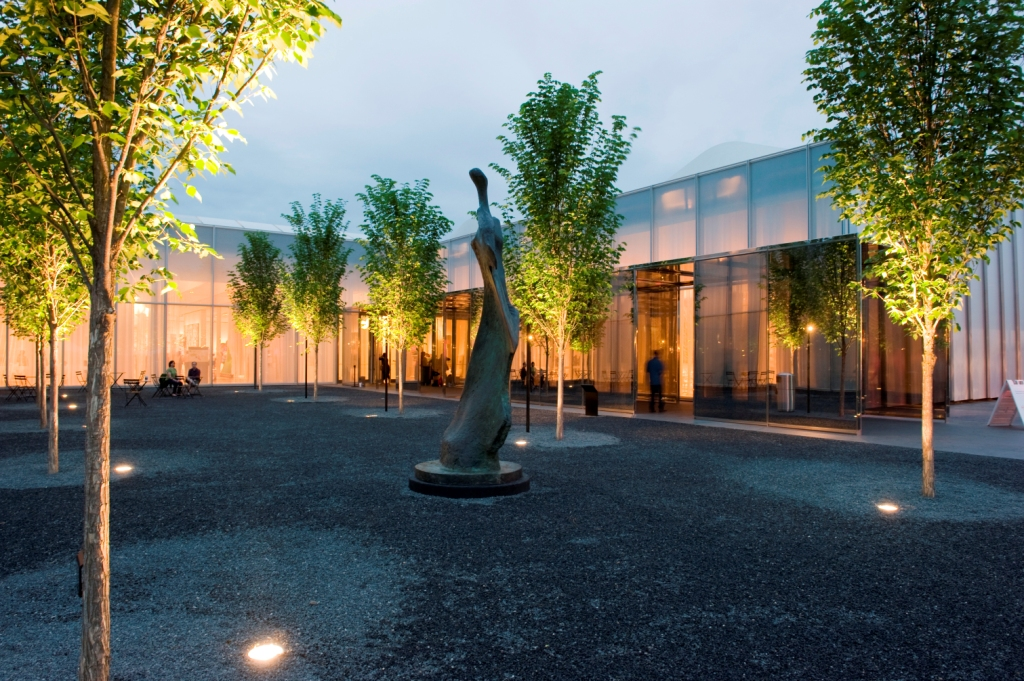
- West Building entrance canopy
- Interactive fullscreen map
- Established: 1947
- Location: 2110 Blue Ridge Road, Raleigh, NC 27607
- Coordinates: 35°48′37″N 78°42′10″W
- Director: Katherine White (interim)
- Website: ncartmuseum.org

The North Carolina Museum of Art (NCMA) is an art museum with a primary campus in Raleigh and a satellite campus in Winston-Salem, North Carolina. It opened in 1956 as the first major museum collection in the country to be formed by state legislation and funding. Since the initial 1947 appropriation that established its collection, the museum has offered free admission to the permanent collection. Its holdings span more than 5,000 years, from antiquity to the present. The museum features over 40 galleries and more than a dozen outdoor works in its 164-acre (0.66 km^{2}) park, one of the largest museum parks in the United States. In 2010, a 127,000-square-foot (11,800 m^{2}) expansion, the West Building, opened; it received an international design award for its energy-efficient design.

== History ==
In 1924, the North Carolina State Art Society formed to generate interest in creating an art museum for the state. In 1928 the society acquired funds and 75 paintings were first displayed in a series of temporary art exhibition spaces in the Agriculture Building in Raleigh in 1929. In 1939, NCMA was moved to the former Supreme Court building. In 1947 the state legislature appropriated $1 million to purchase a collection of artworks for the people of North Carolina. The money was used to purchase 139 European and American works. The Samuel H. Kress Foundation matched the appropriation with a gift of 71 works, primarily from the Italian Renaissance. The 1947 state earmarking of funds for an art collection was the first in the United States. Alice Willson Broughton, the former First Lady of North Carolina, helped procure funding for the collection.

=== Morgan Street location ===
On April 6, 1956, the museum opened in the renovated State Highway Division Building on Morgan Street in downtown Raleigh, the state capital, W. R. Valentiner became the museum's first director. Ben Williams was the first curator of the museum. In 1961, the legislature separated the museum from the Art Society, making it a state agency jointly governed by the state and a board of trustees. Ten years later, NCMA became an entity under what is now the North Carolina Department of Natural and Cultural Resources.

=== Blue Ridge Road and the Stone Building ===
In 1967, the present-day Blue Ridge Road site was chosen as the location for a new building, as the museum had outgrown the Morgan Street location. Designed by Edward Durrell Stone and Associates of New York and Holloway-Reeves Architects of North Carolina, the new building opened in 1983, under the directorship of Edgar Peters Bowron (1981-1985). Stone used spatial experimentation with pure geometric form for the museum by using a square as a basic unit and designing the entire site by manipulating the square form. This was Stone's last major design prior to his death. After he died in 1978, the exterior was changed from white marble to red brick.

=== Expansion ===
In April 2010 the museum opened the new 127,000-square-foot (11,800 m^{2}) West Building, designed by New York-based architects Thomas Phifer and Partners as part of an expansion initiative. The single-story structure, surrounded by sculpture gardens and pools, was created to feature the museum's permanent collection as well as more than 100 new works of art acquired on the occasion of the expansion. Highlights include a gift of 30 Auguste Rodin sculptures and work by artists Roxy Paine, Ursula von Rydingsvard, El Anatsui, Jaume Plensa, Jackie Ferrara, Ellsworth Kelly, and David Park. The project also transformed the museum's East Building into a center for temporary exhibitions, education and public programs, public events, and administrative functions. The project cost $72.3 million. The exterior walls of the West Building are covered with anodized aluminum panels that are canted two degrees back from vertical with seams covered by highly polished steel bands. The roof of the West Building includes parabolic-shaped 6.5 ft (2.0 m) by 37 ft (11 m) coffers, which admit natural light.

== Winston Salem campus ==
In 2007, the North Carolina Department of Natural and Cultural Resources acquired the Southeastern Center for Contemporary Art, a non-profit museum in Winston-Salem and placed it under the management of NCMA. The North Carolina General Assembly renamed SECCA as the North Carolina Museum of Art Winston-Salem in 2023. The SECCA Foundation was dissolved, with its assets transferred to the NCMA Foundation.

The NCMA WS campus has three exhibition rooms with 8,896 square feet (826.5 m^{2}) of space and a 294-seat auditorium. The complex was renovated in 2010 by Szostak Design and closed again in 2026 for further renovations. Reopening is planned for the summer of 2027. In the interim, NCMA WS operates from a temporary location in downtown.

== Permanent collection ==
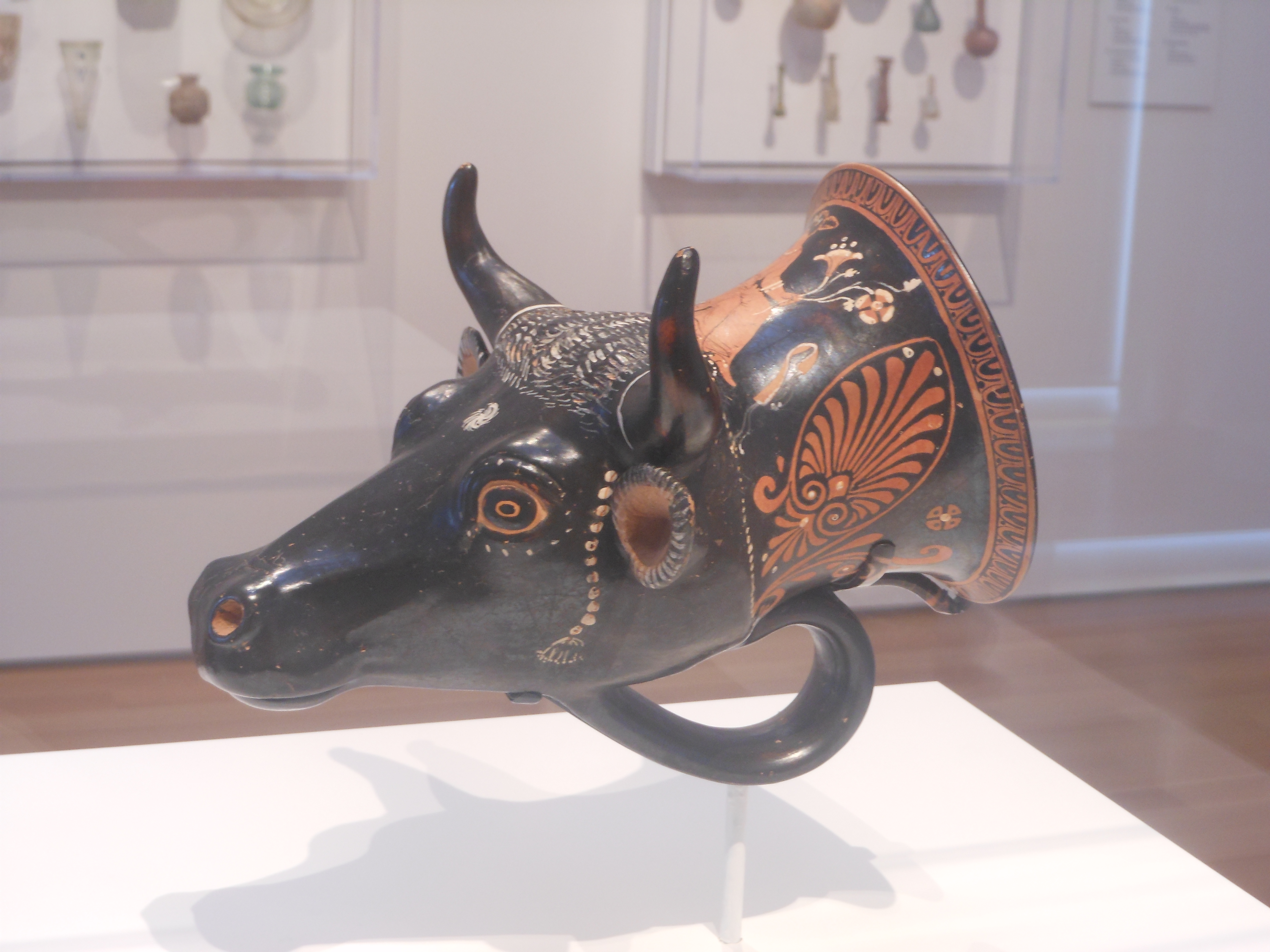
Ancient Greek Hydria at North Carolina Museum of Art

The museum's permanent collection includes European paintings from the Renaissance to the 19th century, Egyptian funerary art, sculpture and vase painting from ancient Greece and Rome, American art of the 18th through 20th centuries, and international contemporary art. Other strengths include African, ancient American, pre-Columbian, and Oceanic art, and Jewish ceremonial objects.

=== African ===
The museum's African collection originated in the 1970s with historical material from the 19th and 20th centuries, including important items from the Benin Kingdom. Later acquisitions expanded regional coverage to include other parts of sub-Saharan Africa with an eye toward assembling works that demonstrated a particular ethnic style, such as those of the Chokwe and Luba peoples of central Africa. Though much of the collection is rooted in traditional media such as wood, metal, and textiles and derives from established creative traditions, many works date from the mid-20th century and give insight into global exchanges that have taken place on the continent for centuries.

=== American ===
The museum's American art collection encompasses paintings and sculpture from the late colonial period (mid-18th century) to the advent of modern art in the early 20th century, beginning with three imposing portraits by John Singleton Copley and concluding with paintings by leading American impressionists. In between, the collection addresses many of the themes and subjects of American art history, such as the celebration of wilderness and the search for a national identity; the conflicts over race, immigration, and social class; and the rapid evolution of society from Jefferson's republic of farmers to Rockefeller's industrial dynamo. In December 2018, the museum acquired the 1865 sculpture Saul by William Wetmore Story.

=== Ancient American ===
The ancient American collection features art from three distinct areas of the Western Hemisphere: Mesoamerica, Central America, and the Andes. The ancient American gallery focuses on Mesoamerica, particularly the art of the ancient Maya. Known for their achievements in science and the arts, the Maya dominated the region for most of two millennia. The museum's collection reflects their religious beliefs, sport, ritual, and daily life.

=== Egyptian ===
Although comprising only 38 artifacts, the ancient Egyptian art collection at the North Carolina Museum of Art represents the major periods of ancient Egyptian history, from the Predynastic (Naqada I, 4000–3500 BCE) to the Roman (30 BCE – 642 CE) periods. The Museum's oldest artifact is a black-topped red ceramic jar handmade approximately 6,000 years ago. All periods combined, the collection's strength resides in funerary material, which includes the painted coffins of Djed Mut and Amunred, servant statues for chores in the afterlife (called shabtis), and a canopic jar that once contained the mummified liver of a man named Qeny. The remainder of the collection focuses on the many gods worshiped in Egypt.

=== European ===
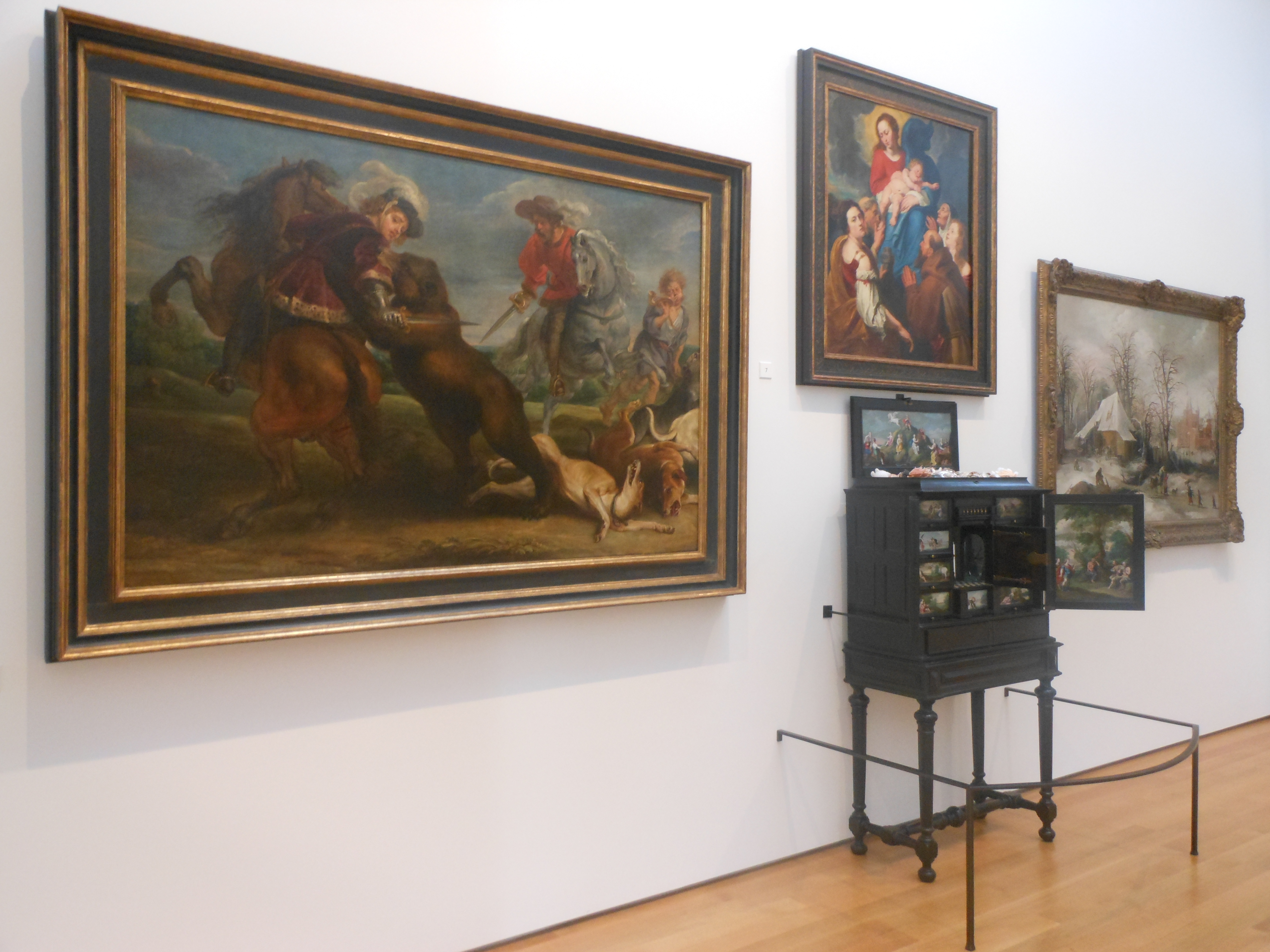
European paintings at North Carolina Museum of Art

The museum's strength lies in its European collection. Of the 139 paintings and sculptures purchased with the original appropriation of funds, 123 were European. When these paintings were augmented by the 75 primarily Italian paintings and sculptures given to the museum by the Samuel H. Kress Foundation in 1961, they created a European collection that is recognized as one of the finest in the United States. The gallery is primarily a collection of paintings such as Virgin and Child in a Landscape by Cima da Conegliano but also includes a number of noteworthy sculptures, including more than 30 bronzes by Auguste Rodin some of which live in the Museum's Rodin Garden.

=== British, Spanish, and French Post–1600 ===
The museum possesses a number of British portraits, most of which are installed in a gallery devoted to European portraiture and its early American counterpart. The collection features important works by Paul van Somer, Anthony van Dyck, Francis Cotes, Sir William Beechey, Thomas Gainsborough, and Sir Henry Raeburn. The museum's French and Spanish collections include paintings of Murillo and portraits and still lifes by Boudin, Millet, Pissarro, and Monet.

=== Italian ===
The museum's collection of Italian paintings is one of its most robust. Highlights include a gallery devoted to altarpieces and devotional works from the 16th through 18th centuries, paintings by Titian and Raphael, and 17th-century baroque art.

=== Northern European ===
The museum's Northern European collection comprises a small but select group of Northern Renaissance paintings and sculptures, an important collection of 17th-century Dutch and Flemish paintings, and a Flemish baroque kunstkamer inspired by 17th-century examples. The 17th-century Dutch and Flemish collections are larger in number and include works by Hendrick Ter Brugghen, Jan Steen, Jan Lievens, Jacob van Ruisdael, and Govaert Flinck, Jan Brueghel the Elder, Peter Paul Rubens, Gerard Seghers, Anthony van Dyck, Jacob Jordaens, and Frans Snyders.

=== Modern (to circa 1960) ===
In West Building the museum's modern collection occupies several rooms with works by the foremost German modern artists of the early 20th century such as Franz Kline and Lyonel Feininger as well first generation of American modernists such as Alberto Giacometti. Cubist and surrealist pieces by Paul Delvaux and Joseph Cornell as well as other Modern masters such as Richard Diebenkorn, Andrew Wyeth, and Alberto Giacometti.

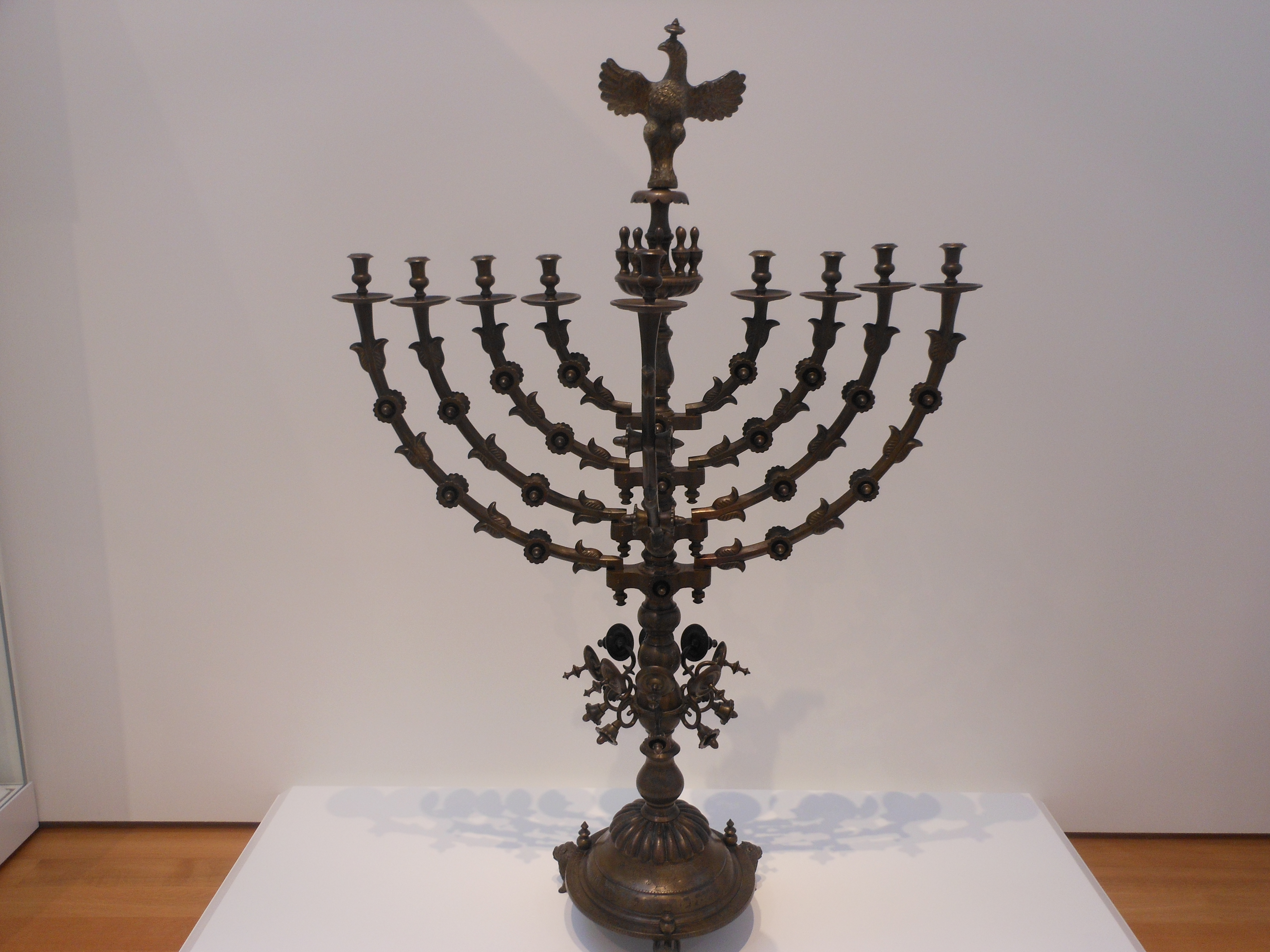
Menorah In the Judaic Section

=== Judaic ===
The museum's Judaic art collection celebrates the spiritual life and ceremonies of the Jewish people through ritual objects of artistic excellence. It is one of only two galleries devoted to Judaica in an American art museum. The Judaic Art Gallery features objects from the major Jewish traditions—Ashkenazi, Sephardi, and Mizrahi—as well as from modern Israel. All objects are designed for use in synagogue worship, observance of the Sabbath and holidays, or ceremonial occasions honoring the life cycle and Jewish home. Examples of objects that are displayed include a Menorah and Torah scrolls.

=== Contemporary ===
East Building of the NCMA, featuring Bob Trotman's Vertigo (2010), Michael Richard's Tar Baby vs. St. Sebastian (1999), Hayv Kahraman's Kawliya 1 (2014), et al.

The museum's contemporary art collection has grown through acquisitions in new and experimental media, including Bill Viola's video The Quintet of Remembrance (2000) and Michal Rovner's video installation Tfila (2004). The museum has also acquired works by artists of diverse cultural and regional backgrounds. In 2003, it began collecting contemporary photography; by 2010, holdings totaled over 200 photographs by national and international photographers, including works by Rosemary Laing, Dinh Q. Lê, Vera Lutter, and Lorna Simpson. Acquisitions in the 2010s include works by Hank Willis Thomas, Kehinde Wiley, Mickalene Thomas, and Dan Estabrook.

In 2010, Jaume Plensa's Spiegel I and Spiegel II were installed in the museum's garden. The identical figures, made of white painted stainless steel, each measure 377×235×245 cm.

The collection also includes a comprehensive survey of North Carolina artists, including Elizabeth Matheson, Elliott Dangerfield and Ernie Barnes.

== Museum Park ==
Encompassing 164 acres (0.66 km^{2}) of fields, woodlands, and creeks, the Museum Park features more than a dozen site-specific works of art and two miles (3 km) of trails. The campus is one of the largest museum art parks in North America. In the warm weather months, outdoor movies and concerts were presented at the Joseph M. Bryan, Jr., Amphitheater. As of 2025, the Amphitheater is under construction and won't be hosting any outdoors movies and concerts in 2025 and 2026.

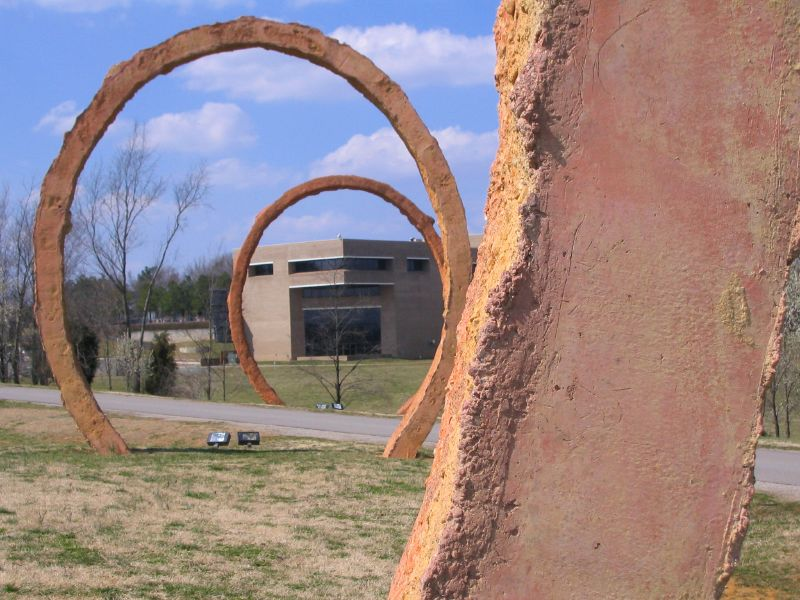
"gyre" by Raleigh-based artist Thomas Sayre

The museum's contemporary art program extends into the landscape surrounding the museum, where artists have created both temporary and permanent site-specific works of art in the Museum Park. As of 2010, art on view in the Park includes works by Thomas Sayre, Vollis Simpson, Martha Jackson Jarvis, Ledelle Moe and a camera obscura entitled Cloud Chamber for the Trees and Sky by Chris Drury. Other outdoor sculptures—Ronald Bladen's Three Elements, Henry Moore's Large Spindle Piece and Large Standing Figure: Knife Edge—are installed in the gardens surrounding West Building. Picture This, part of the museum's amphitheater, is a monumental work of art designed by artist Barbara Kruger in collaboration with architects and landscape architects.

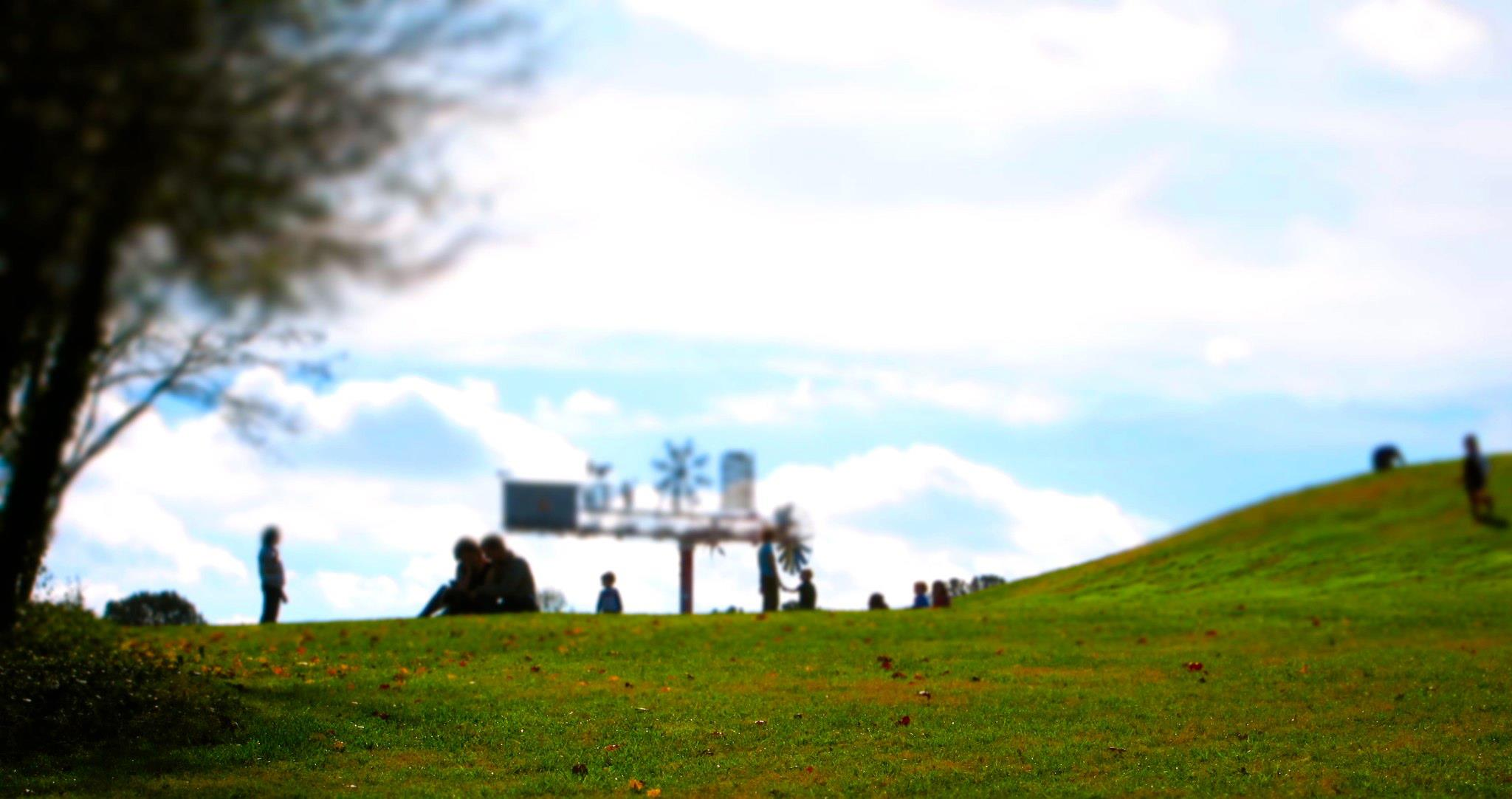
Sculptures At Museum's Park

== Exhibitions ==
Since renovations in 2010, the East Building provides a series of rotating exhibitions featuring an NC gallery, a photography gallery, education exhibitions, and at least two traveling or temporary exhibitions on display.

=== Previous exhibitions ===
- Forever and Never: Photographs by Dan Estabrook, September 2024 – January 2025
- Word Up: The Intersection of Text and Image, July 22, 2012 – January 20, 2013
- Project 35, August 19, 2012 – June 2, 2013
- Edvard Munch: Symbolism in Print, September 23, 2012 – February 10, 2013
- Still-Life Masterpieces: A Visual Feast from the Museum of Fine Arts, Boston, October 21, 2012 – January 13, 2013
- John James Audubon's The Birds of America, November 7, 2010 – ongoing
- A Discerning Eye: Julian T. Baker Jr. Photography Collection, June 17, 2012 – December 2, 2012
- Rhythms of the Heart: The Illustration of Ashley Bryan, April 15, 2012 – August 19, 2012
- Reflections: Portraits by Beverly McIver, December 11, 2011 – June 24, 2012
- Rembrandt in America, October 30, 2011 – January 22, 2012
- Mirror Image: Women Portraying Women, June 5 – November 27, 2011
- Presence/Absence, November 27, 2011 – May 27, 2012
- 30 Americans: Contemporary African American Art Collection from the Rubell Family, March 19, 2011 – September 4, 2011
- Alter Ego: A Decade of Work by Anthony Goicolea, April 17 – July 24, 2011
- American Chronicles: The Art of Norman Rockwell, November 7, 2010 – January 30, 2011
- Binh Danh exhibition, November 7, 2010 – January 30, 2011
- Bob Trotman: Inverted Utopias, November 7, 2010 – March 27, 2011
- Fins and Feathers: Original Children's Book Illustrations from The Eric Carle Museum of Picture Book Art, November 7, 2010 – January 30, 2011
- Julie Mehretu: City Sitings, August 17 – November 30, 2008
- Far from Home, February 17 – July 13, 2008
- Landscapes from the Age of Impressionism, October 21, 2007 – January 20, 2008
- The BIG Picture, March 18, 2007 – September 2, 2007
- Temples and Tombs: Treasures of Egyptian Art from The British Museum, April 14 – July 8, 2007
- Contemporary North Carolina Photography from the Museum's Collection, First rotation: September 3 – November 5, 2006; Second rotation: November 19, 2006 – February 18, 2007
- Revolution in Paint, September 17, 2006 – February 11, 2007
- Monet in Normandy, October 15, 2006 – January 14, 2007
- Common Ground: Discovering Community in 150 Years of Art, dates unknown
- Selections from the Collection of Julia J. Norrell, May 7 – July 16, 2006
- Sordid and Sacred: The Beggars in Rembrandt's Etchings: Selections from the John Villarino Collection, March 5 – May 28, 2006
- The Potter's Eye: Art and Tradition in North Carolina Pottery, October 30, 2005 – March 19, 2006
- Crosscurrents: Art, Craft, and Design in North Carolina, September 25, 2005 – January 8, 2006
- On-line Exhibition: Winners of the In Focus Digital Photography Contest, through December 31, 2005
- Shadow Boxes: Collages of Experience and Memory, August 15 – December 11, 2005
- Fusion: Contemporary Glass Art from North Carolina Collections, May 8 – August 7, 2005
- In Focus: Contemporary Photography from The Allen G. Thomas Jr. Collection, April 3 – July 17, 2005
- Objects of Desire: The Museum Collects, 1994–2004, ended March 2, 2005
- Matisse, Picasso and the School of Paris: Masterpieces from The Baltimore Museum of Art, October 10, 2004 – January 16, 2005
- American Eden: Landscape Masterworks of the Hudson River School: From the Collection of the Wadsworth Atheneum Museum of Art, June 6 – August 29, 2004
- Brushes With Life: Art, Artists and Mental Illness, ended August 15, 2004
- Defying Gravity: Contemporary Art and Flight, November 2, 2003 – March 7, 2004
- Augustus Saint-Gaudens: American Sculptor of the Gilded Age, February 23 – May 11, 2003
- Accent of Africa, April 6 – August 10, 2003
- In Memoriam: George Bireline (1923–2002), December 18, 2002 – August 3, 2003
- Art in the Age of Rubens and Rembrandt, October 13, 2002 – January 5, 2003
- Selections from The Birds of America by John James Audubon, July 14 – December 1, 2002
- The Reverend McKendree Robbins Long: Picture Painter of the Apocalypse, April 7 – August 25, 2002
- Empire of the Sultans: Ottoman Art from the Khalili Collection, May 19 – July 28, 2002
- Toulouse-Lautrec: Master of the Moulin Rouge from the Collection of The Baltimore Museum of Art, November 11, 2001 – February 17, 2002
- Picasso, Braque, Léger: Paintings from the Collection of Mr. and Mrs. Julian H. Robertson, June 10 – September 9, 2001
- Xu-Bing: Reading Landscape, April 29 – August 5, 2001
- Stanton Macdonald-Wright and Synchromism, March 4 – July 1, 2001
- Is Seeing Believing, January 14 – April 1, 2001
- Ansel Adams, October 8, 2000 – January 7, 2001
- Rodin, April 16 – August 13, 2000
- Alphonse Mucha: The Spirit of Art Nouveau, January 31 – March 28, 1999
- Sinners and Saints, Darkness and Light: Caravaggio and His Dutch and Flemish Followers, September 27 – December 13, 1998
- Closing: The Life and Death of an American Factory, Photographs by Bill Bamberger, July 26 – October 18, 1998

== See also ==
- List of contemporary amphitheatres
