= Sambo's Grave =

Historical burial site

Coordinates: 53.9963°N 2.8827°W

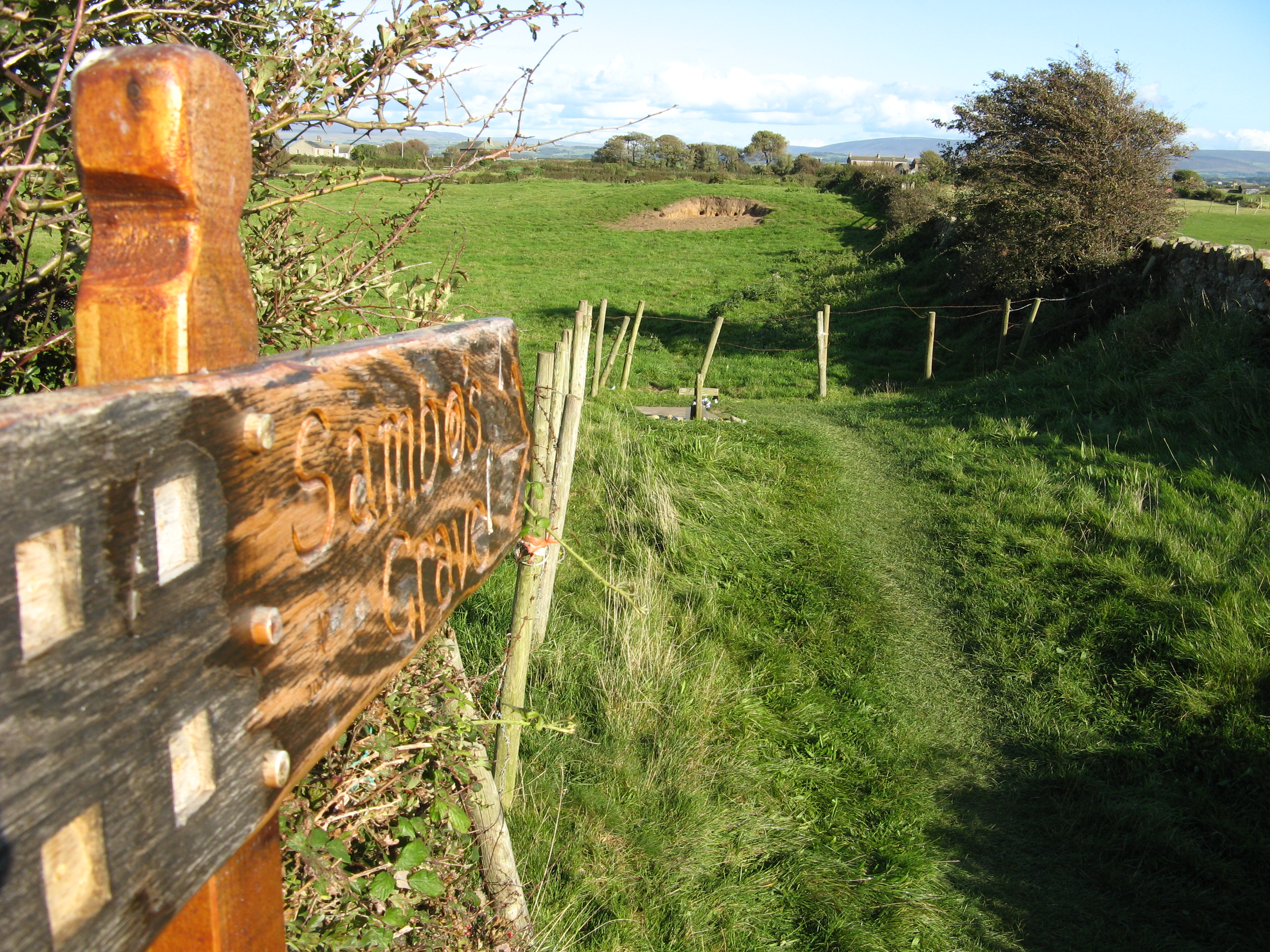
Sambo's Grave in 2008

Sambo's Grave is the burial site of a black cabin boy or slave on unconsecrated ground in a field near the small village of Sunderland, Lancashire, England. Sunderland was a port, serving cotton, sugar and slave ships from the West Indies and North America, which declined after Glasson Dock was opened in 1787. It is a very small community only accessible via a narrow road, which crosses a salt marsh and is cut off at high tide.

== History ==
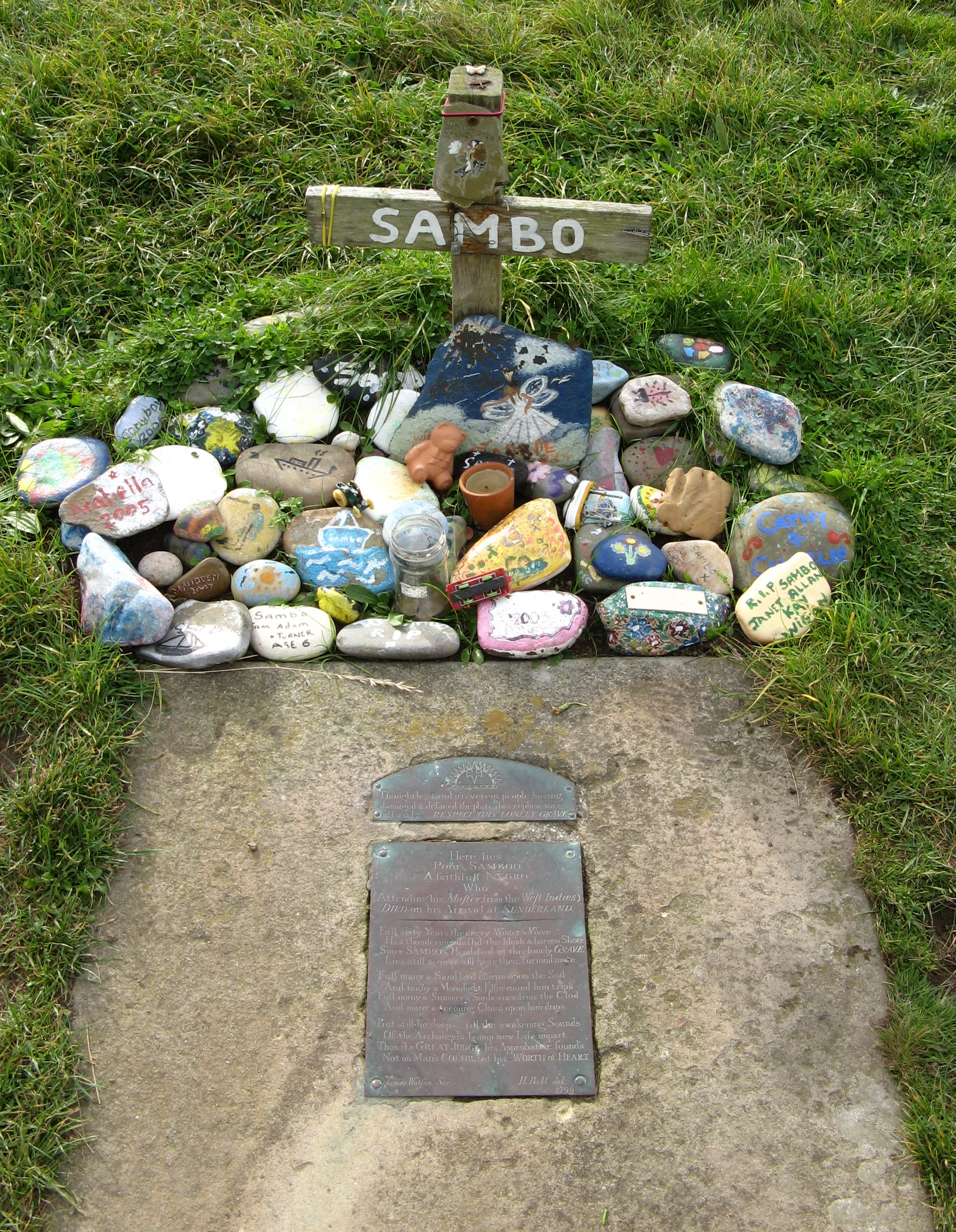
Sambo's Grave, 2007

In the early 18th century Sunderland was a port for Lancaster serving ships too large to sail up to the town. According to the Lonsdale Magazine of 1822, which appears to rely on the then oral history, Sambo had arrived around 1736 from the West Indies as a servant to the captain of an unnamed ship:

After she had discharged her cargo, he was placed at the inn…with the intention of remaining there on board wages till the vessel was ready to sail; but supposing himself to be deserted by the master, without being able, probably from his ignorance of the language, to ascertain the cause, he fell into a complete state of stupefaction, even to such a degree that he secreted himself in the loft on the brewhouses and stretching himself out at full length on the bare boards refused all sustenance. He continued in this state only a few days, when death terminated the sufferings of poor Samboo. As soon as Samboo's exit was known to the sailors who happened to be there, they excavated him in a grave in a lonely dell in a rabbit warren behind the village, within twenty yards of the sea shore, whither they conveyed his remains without either coffin or bier, being covered only with the clothes in which he died.

— Lonsdale Magazine, 1822

It has also been suggested that Sambo may have died from a disease to which he had no natural immunity, contracted from contact with Europeans. He was buried in unconsecrated ground (as he was not a Christian) on the weatherbeaten shoreline of Morecambe Bay.

=== Plaque ===
With the opening of Glasson Dock in 1787, trade ships deserted Sunderland and it became a sea-bathing place and holiday venue. Sixty years after the burial, a retired headmaster of Lancaster boys' grammar school, James Watson, heard the story and raised money from summer visitors to the area for a memorial, to be placed on the unmarked grave. Watson, who was the brother of the prominent Lancaster slave trader, William Watson, also wrote the epitaph that now marks the grave (note the use of ſ, the long s character, and the eccentric and inconsistent spelling typical of the time):

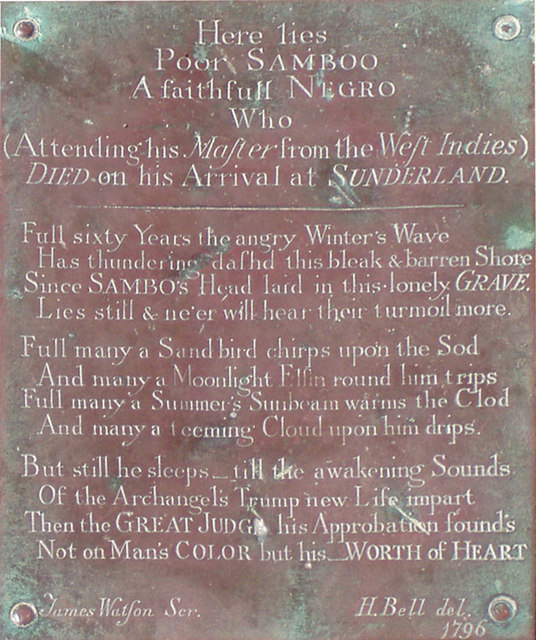
The plaque

Here lies
Poor Samboo
A faithfull Negro
Who
(Attending his Maſter from the Weſt Indies)
Died on his Arrival at Sunderland

Full sixty Years the angry Winter's Wave
Has thundering daſhd this bleak & barren Shore
Since Sambo's Head laid in this lonely Grave
Lies still & ne'er will hear their turmoil more.

Full many a Sandbird chirps upon the Sod
And many a Moonlight Elfin round him trips
Full many a Summer's Sunbeam warms the Clod
And many a teeming Cloud upon him drips.

But still he sleeps _ till the awakening Sounds
Of the Archangel's Trump new Life impart
Then the Great Judge his Approbation founds
Not on Man's Color but his_Worth of Heart

James Watſon Scr. H.Bell del. 1796

The present plaque is a modern replica, replacing the original which had been stolen. This is explained by a smaller plaque, set immediately above the main plaque, which reads:

Thoughtless and irreverent people having
damaged & defaced the plate, this replica was
affixed. RESPECT THIS LONELY GRAVE

== Preservation ==
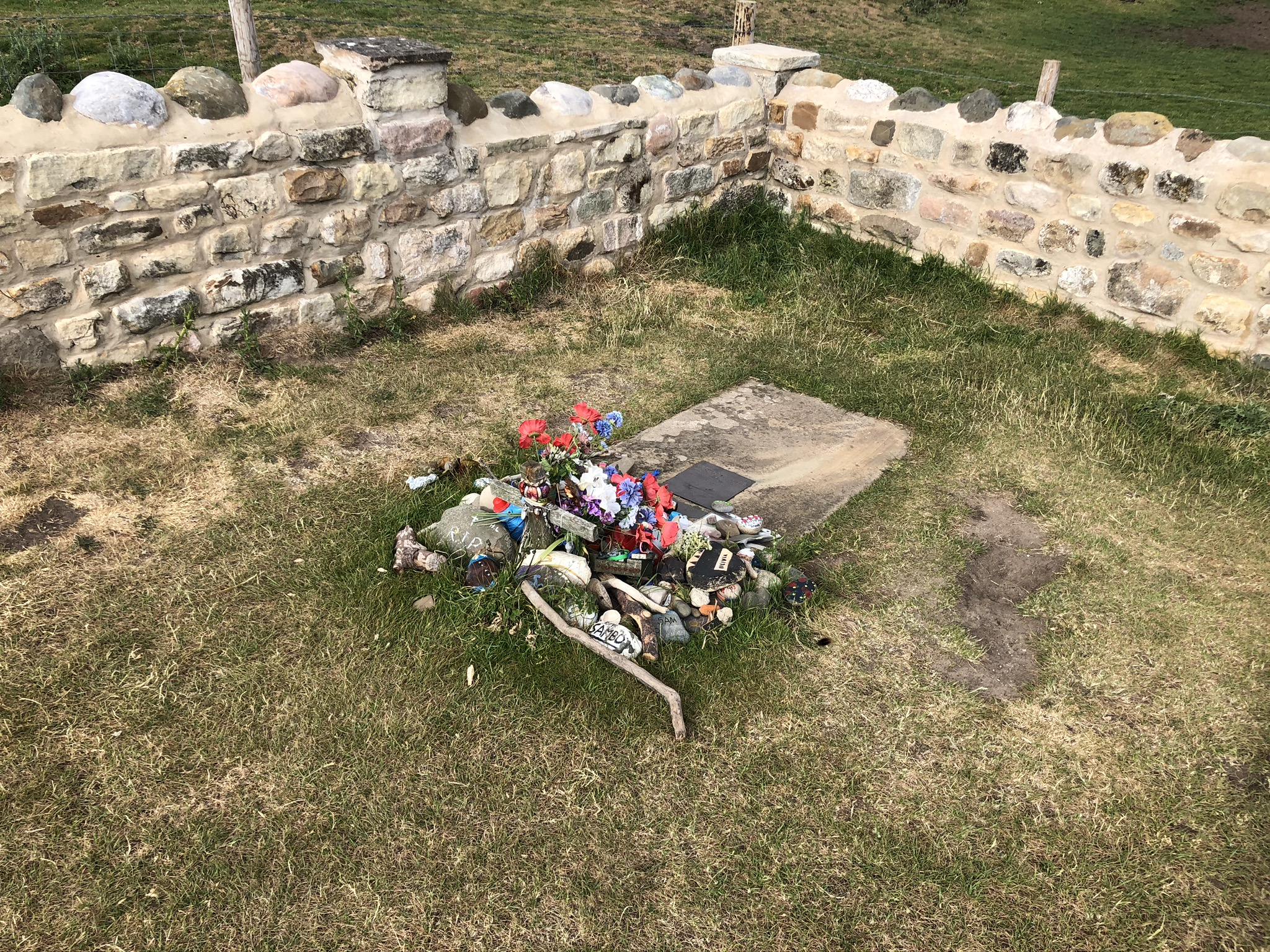
Sambo's Grave, 2020

Official signposts on Sunderland Point define the grave and locality as a tourist attraction. The grave almost always bears flowers or stones painted by local children. The grave was enclosed by a low stone wall in 2019 and Chris Drury's "Horizon Line Chamber" was built on the approach path.
