= Cloud Chamber for the Trees and Sky =

Outdoor artwork by Chris Drury

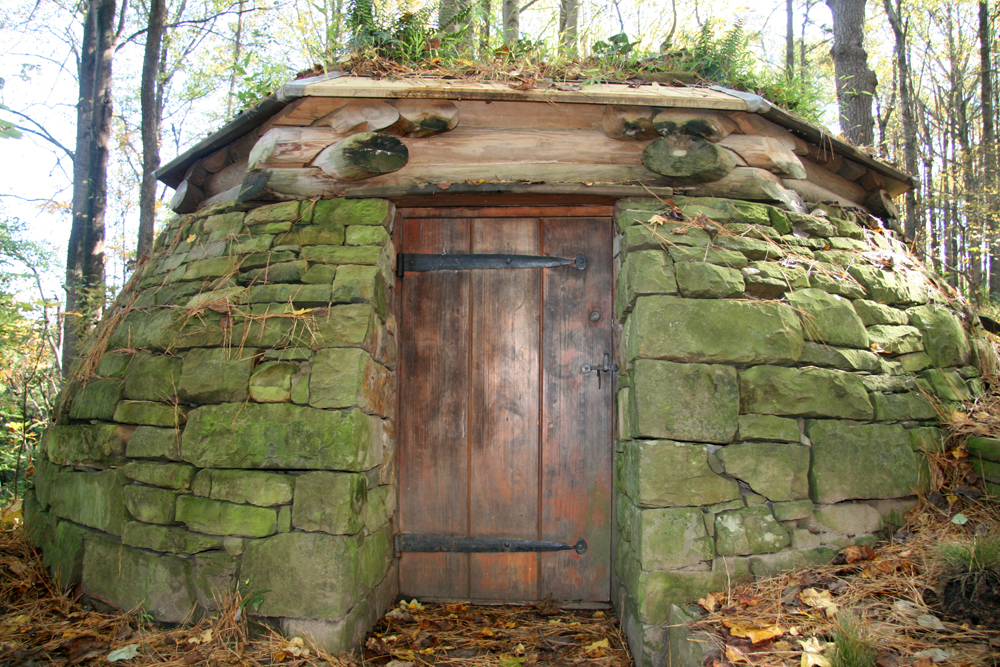
- Artist: Chris Drury
- Location: Raleigh, North Carolina, United States; 35.8061°N 78.6991°W

Cloud Chamber for the Trees and Sky is a site specific outdoor artwork by Chris Drury. It was commissioned by North Carolina Museum of Art in 2003 made possible by the Robert F. Phifer Bequest and located in the 146 acre museum park adjacent to the museum known as the Ann and Jim Goodnight Museum Park at state capital Raleigh. The artwork is situated in woodland with other large sculptures and is accessed along a woodland path.

The chamber itself is a round building built of stone, wood, and turf approximately 12 feet in diameter (3.66 metres) with a single door to admit the viewer. It is light-tight when its door is closed, except for one small, round opening in its roof which allows the building to act as a camera obscura. Images of the sun, clouds, and trees are projected onto the smooth white walls of the interior of the chamber. Classed as a public artwork, there is no admission charge to the park.

== See also ==
- Camera obscura
- Environmental sculpture
