= Overton, Lancashire =

Village in Lancashire, England

Coordinates: 54.015°N 2.860°W

Overton
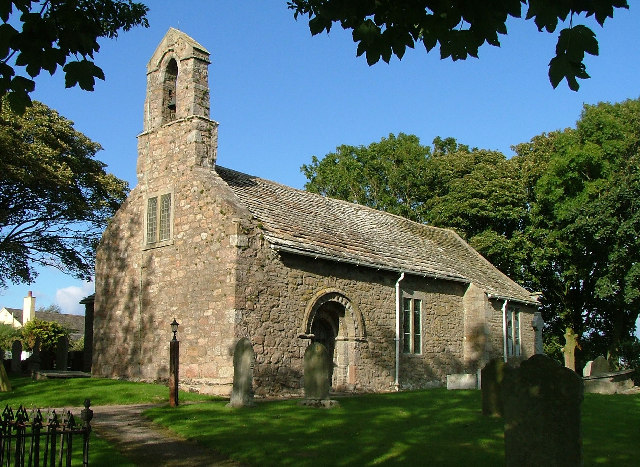
- St Helen's Church

- Location in the City of Lancaster district Location within Lancashire
- Population: 1,014 (2021)
- OS grid reference: SD436580
- Civil parish: Overton
- District: Lancaster
- Shire county: Lancashire
- Region: North West
- Country: England
- Sovereign state: United Kingdom
- Post town: MORECAMBE
- Postcode district: LA3
- Dialling code: 01524
- Police: Lancashire
- Fire: Lancashire
- Ambulance: North West
- UK Parliament: Morecambe and Lunesdale

Overton is a village and civil parish in Lancashire, England, south west of Lancaster and south of Morecambe between Heysham and the estuary of the River Lune. Neighbouring villages include Middleton and Sunderland Point; Glasson is on the opposite side of the river. The parish had a population of 1,014 at the 2021 census.

== History ==
Overton was known as Oureton, when it was listed in the Domesday Book. The village contains St Helen's Church, which is claimed to be oldest church in Lancashire.

== Governance ==
An electoral ward of the same name, stretching to Middleton and the surrounding area, had a population of 2,414 at the 2011 Census.

== Transport ==
All routes in Overton are run by Stagecoach.

Number	Destination
5	Carnforth via Heysham and Morecambe.

A few peak time services 1/1A extend to here going to the university.

== See also ==
- Listed buildings in Overton, Lancashire
