= Listed buildings in Overton, Lancashire =

Overton is a civil parish in Lancaster, Lancashire, England. It contains 29 buildings that are recorded in the National Heritage List for England as designated listed buildings. Of these, one is at Grade II*, the middle grade, and the others are at Grade II, the lowest grade.

The parish contains the village of Overton, and the listed buildings in and around the village are mainly houses and farmhouses, together with a church and the remains of a cross. To the southwest of the village is the peninsula of Sunderland Point, between the mouth of the River Lune and Morecambe Bay. In the early 18th century it was the site of the port for Lancaster and a ship building yard. Following the development of Glasson Dock in the 1780s it became redundant, but a small community remains there. The wharf is listed, together with a number of houses, some of which have been converted from former warehouses, and a mission church.

== Key ==
Grade	Criteria
II*	Particularly important buildings of more than special interest
II	Buildings of national importance and special interest

== Buildings ==
Name and location	Photograph	Date	Notes	Grade
St Helen's Church; 54.01121°N 2.85531°W		12th century	The church was rebuilt in 1771, the north transept was added in 1803, and it was restored in 1902 by Austin and Paley. It is in sandstone with a stone-slate roof. The church consists of a nave, a wider chancel, a north transept containing a vestry, and a north porch. On the west gable is a bellcote, and on the south side is a Norman doorway. Inside the church are box pews and galleries at the west end and in the transept.	II*
Cross remains 54.01107°N 2.85538°W	—	Medieval (probable)	The remains of the cross are in the churchyard of St Helen's Church. They are in sandstone and consist of a base and part of the shaft. The base is roughly square with a socket, and the shaft is rectangular and tapering.	II
North Farmhouse; 54.01535°N 2.86086°W		1674	A sandstone house with a slate roof, in two storeys with an attic and three bays. The windows are sashes, and the central doorway has a chamfered surround with an inscribed shaped lintel.	II
Globe Farmhouse; 54.01507°N 2.86109°W		Late 17th century	The house is in rendered stone with a slate roof, and in two storeys and three bays. The windows are mullioned, and the central doorway has a moulded surround and a triangular head.	II
Old Hall; 53.99305°N 2.87780°W		1683	A house that was altered and extended in the 19th century, it is in rendered stone with a slate roof. It has a T-shaped plan, with two storeys with an attic. Some of the windows are mullioned, and others are sashes. On the front is a single-storey porch with a Tudor arched doorway and a balcony with a canopy. There is a re-set lintel inscribed with initials and the date. The later additions include a verandah and an octagonal pavilion.	II
Farm building, Second Terrace; 53.99485°N 2.87670°W	—	1707	The farm building was probably converted from a house, and is in cobbles with a slate roof. It has a blocked doorway with a moulded surround and an inscribed shaped lintel. Elsewhere are two wide entrances, one of which is blocked, mullioned windows, some of which are blocked, a blocked wide entrance, and pitching holes.	II
Colloway Farmhouse; 54.02468°N 2.85121°W	—	1708	A house in stone with a slate roof, in two storeys and three bays. The windows are mullioned, and the doorway has a moulded surround with an inscribed shaped lintel.	II
Quay marker stone 53.99464°N 2.87661°W	—	Early 18th century	The stone is in sandstone, originally marking the limit of the quay, and later used as a gatepost. It is tapered and about 1.4 metres (4 ft 7 in) high. On the side facing the river are carvings, including initials and a date.	II
1 The Lane; 53.99682°N 2.87628°W		Early to mid 18th century	A sandstone house with a slate roof in two storeys. There is a door in the ground floor, and a flight of stone steps leading to a first floor doorway. The windows in the upper floor are sashes.	II
Manor House Farmhouse; 54.01542°N 2.86040°W	—	Early to mid 18th century	The house is in sandstone with a stone-slate roof. It is in two storeys and has a symmetrical five-bay front. The windows are sashes, and the central doorway has a panelled surround and an architrave with a fluted keystone.	II
Summer House; 53.99722°N 2.87841°W		Early to mid 18th century	A house, possibly originating as a look-out for ships, that was extended in the 1890s. It is in partly pebbledashed and partly stuccoed stone, and has a pyramidal roof in slate and stone-slate. Initially it had one storey with a cellar, and an additional floor has been added.	II
13 Main Street; 54.01479°N 2.86260°W	—	1739	This is a rendered stone house with a slate roof, in two storeys and two bays. Above the central doorway is a plaque inscribed with initials and the date. The windows are modern.	II
April Cottage; 54.01474°N 2.86272°W	—	1741	A pebbledashed stone house with a slate roof, in two storeys and three bays. The windows, formerly mullioned, have plain surrounds. In the right bay is former cart entrance with a segmental arch containing modern doors. There is a gabled porch, above which is a plaque inscribed with initials and the date.	II
Dennison Farmhouse; 54.01450°N 2.86068°W	—	1742	The house is in sandstone with a modern tiled roof, and has two storeys and two bays. The windows are mullioned, and the doorway has a chamfered surround. Above the doorway is a plaque inscribed with initials and the date.	II
Old Custom House; 53.99774°N 2.87630°W	—	Mid 18th century	The house is in pebbledashed stone with sandstone dressings and a slate roof, and is in two storeys with an attic. The windows are modern, and the house has a later verandah.	II
Wharf and gate pier, First Terrace; 53.99683°N 2.87594°W		Mid 18th century (probable)	The wharf is in sandstone and contains a flight of stone steps. Along it are 15 stone posts, and at the southern end is a square gate pier; this is rusticated and has a moulded cornice and a ball finial.	II
13 Second Terrace; 53.99549°N 2.87666°W	—	18th century	A pebbledashed house converted from a warehouse, with a slate roof. It is in three storeys and three bays. The doorway is in the central bay, and the windows are modern.	II
14 Second Terrace; 53.99540°N 2.87668°W	—	18th century	Originally a warehouse, later converted into a house, it is pebbledashed stone with a slate roof. There are three storeys and three bays. The central bay contains a two-storey timber porch, and the windows are modern.	II
16 and 17 Second Terrace; 53.99532°N 2.87666°W	—	Mid 18th century	A pair of houses converted from warehouses, pebbledashed with a slate roof. They have three storeys and each house has two bays. The windows are modern.	II
Cotton Tree Cottage; 53.99471°N 2.87670°W		1751	A pebbledashed stone house with a slate roof, in two storeys with a symmetrical two bay front. The central doorway has a moulded surround, and above it is a plaque inscribed with initials and the date. The windows are modern.	II
10 First Terrace; 53.99703°N 2.87603°W	—	Late 18th century	This is a rendered stone house with a tiled roof. It has two storeys and two bays. The windows are sashes.	II
11 First Terrace; 53.99685°N 2.87607°W		Late 18th century	The house is in rendered stone with a tiled roof. There are two storeys and three bays. In the left bay is a two-storey canted bay window, and in the centre bay is a doorway with a cornice hood on consoles. The windows are sashes. On the right is an extension with a blocked arched entrance with a keystone and containing a modern window.	II
15 Second Terrace; 53.99536°N 2.87667°W	—	Late 18th century (probable)	This is a rendered house with a slate roof in two storeys and a single bay. The door at the left is approached by stone steps, and the windows are sashes.	II
The Haven; 53.99717°N 2.87596°W	—	Late 18th century	The house is in rendered stone with a slate roof, in two storeys and four bays. In the right bay is a two-storey canted bay window. Most of the windows are sashes, and the doorway in the third bay has a plain surround.	II
Overton Hall; 54.01423°N 2.86349°W		Late 18th century	A rendered stone house with a slate roof, in two storeys with an attic and three bays. The windows are sashes, and the central door has a plain surround.	II
8 and 9 First Terrace; 53.99702°N 2.87603°W	—	Early 19th century (probable}	A pair of rendered stone houses with a modern tiled roof, in three storeys. Each house has a bay window, and the other windows are sashes or modern.	II
4 First Terrace; 53.99734°N 2.87592°W	—	19th century (probable}	A pebbledashed stone house with a slate roof, it has two storeys and two bays. The windows are modern, and the ground floor has a glazed porch.	II
5 and 6 First Terrace; 53.99727°N 2.87595°W		Mid 19th century (probable}	A pair of pebbledashed stone houses with a slate roof in two storeys. No 6 on the left has two bays, and No 5 has one. The doorways are in the centre, and the windows, apart from one sash window, are modern.	II
Mission Church, Sunderland Point; 53.99699°N 2.87831°W		1894	The church, designed by Paley, Austin and Paley, is built in Claughton red brick and has a Westmorland slate roof. It has a rectangular plan, with a projecting northwest porch, a projecting northeast vestry, and a projecting southwest toilet bay. On the gable end is a bell with a canopy.	II
