= Sunderland, Lancashire =

Coordinates: 53.998°N 2.876°W

Sunderland: Sunderland Point
- Village
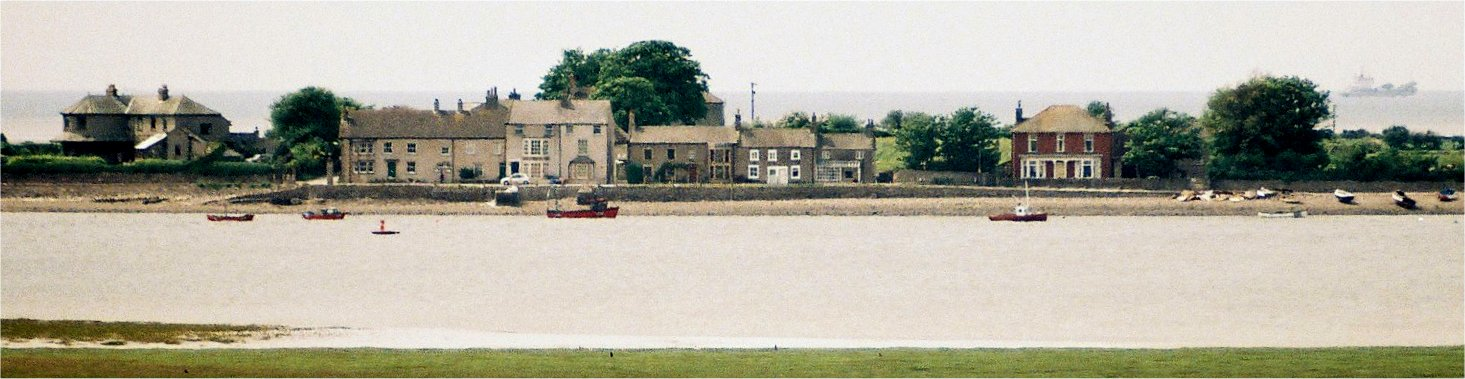
- Sunderland from across the River Lune

- Location in the City of Lancaster district Location within Lancashire
- OS grid reference: SD426562
- Civil parish: Overton
- District: Lancaster
- Shire county: Lancashire
- Region: North West
- Country: England
- Sovereign state: United Kingdom
- Post town: MORECAMBE
- Postcode district: LA3
- Dialling code: 01524
- Police: Lancashire
- Fire: Lancashire
- Ambulance: North West
- UK Parliament: Morecambe and Lunesdale

Sunderland, commonly known as Sunderland Point, is a small village among the marshes, on a windswept peninsula between the mouth of the River Lune and Morecambe Bay, in the City of Lancaster district of Lancashire, England. It was used as a port for slave ships and cotton ships but its importance declined as other ports such as Lancaster were opened up.

Strictly speaking, "Sunderland Point" is the name of the tip of the peninsula on which the village of Sunderland stands, but the name is frequently applied to the village itself.

== Geography ==
Sunderland is unique in the United Kingdom as being the only community to be on the mainland and yet dependent upon tidal access. The only vehicular access to the village is via a single-track road from Overton 1.5 miles (2.4 km) away crossing a tidal marsh. The road is covered by water at every high tide. Among other effects, this results in the children of Sunderland sometimes being required to arrive late at school in Overton or to leave early to avoid being cut off by the tide. There is also access via a footpath and a bridlepath, neither of which are affected by tides.

== History ==
It was developed as an outport for Lancaster by Robert Lawson, a Quaker, at the beginning of the 18th century. Reportedly, stonework from the ruined Cockersand Abbey just across the river was utilised in the construction of the quay and buildings. Lawson finally went bankrupt in 1728, which began a steady decline until it was totally surpassed by Glasson Dock, which opened in 1787.

Ships could unload here, or wait for the tide before moving up to the main docks at St. George's Quay in Lancaster and registering at the Customs House. Sailors were known to press-gang new recruits at the Three Mariners public house, just off the quay in Lancaster, and at the Golden Ball on the way back along the river at Snatchems.

=== Sambo's Grave ===
The Port of Lancaster, once the third-largest in the country, was part of the slavery triangle. The master of a slave or servant called Sambo left him at Sunderland Point whilst he travelled on to Lancaster to undertake his business in the rest of Britain. Sambo died in 1736 in the old brewery, which still stands on the corner of the pathway that leads to his grave. Sambo's Grave on the unconsecrated (as he was not a Christian) and windswept shoreline of Morecambe Bay is still a local tourist attraction today. The grave almost always bears flowers or stones painted by local children.

== Today ==
Along the quay at Sunderland Point are a number of late 17th-century and Georgian dwellings which are well protected against the weather, one of which is a former hostelry. There is also an early 18th-century gatepier on the quay that Pevsner thought worthy of note. The hamlet was featured in the TV drama The Ruby in the Smoke with Billie Piper and Julie Walters in December 2006.

Many properties at Sunderland Point suffer regular flooding, with individual properties made resilient to the effects.

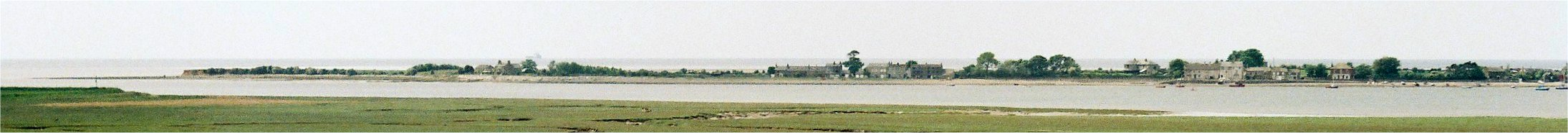
Sunderland Point, the tip of the peninsula, is on the left. Sunderland village is centre and right. (Scroll to see whole image.)

== Gallery ==
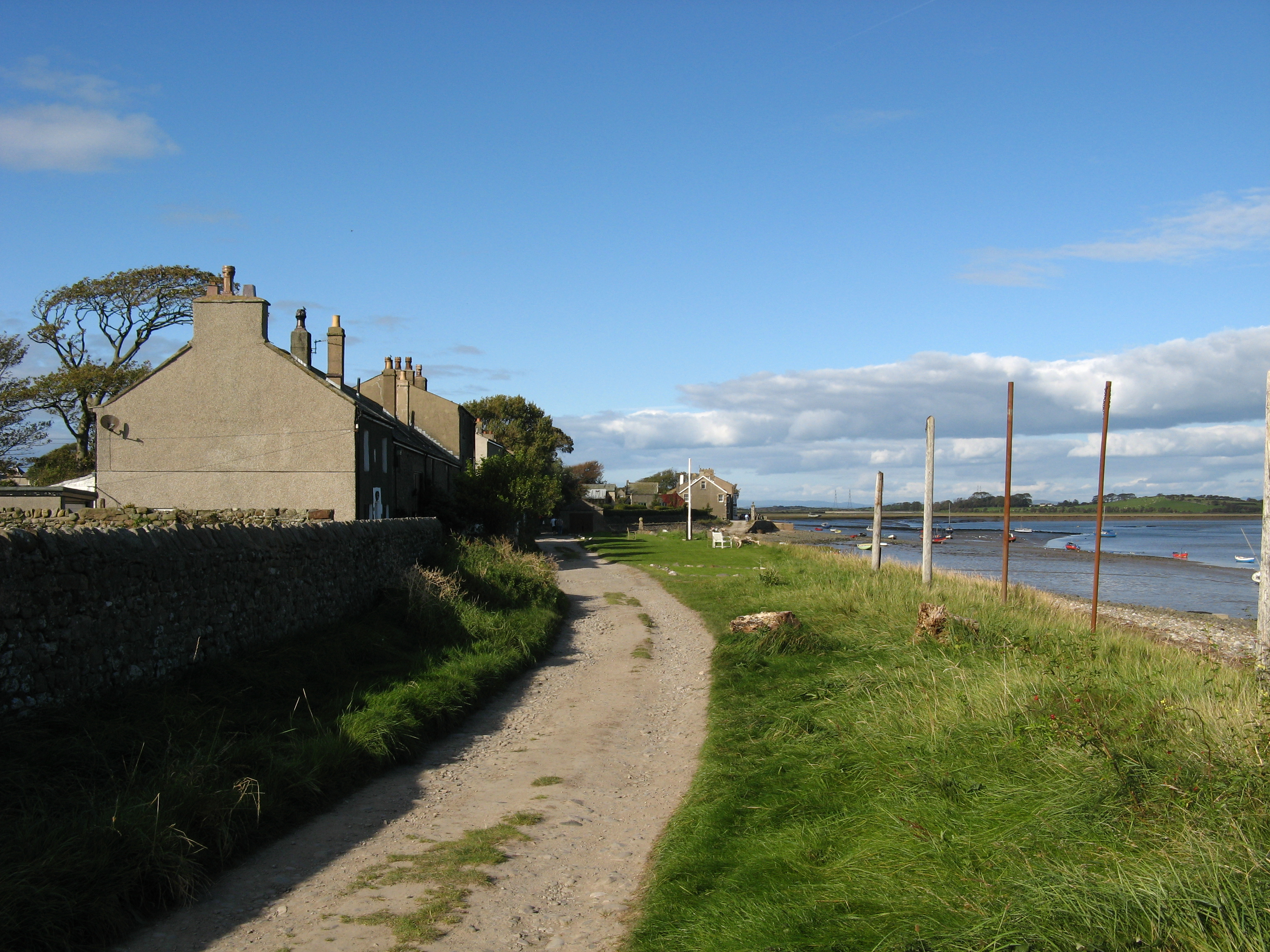
Sunderland from the south

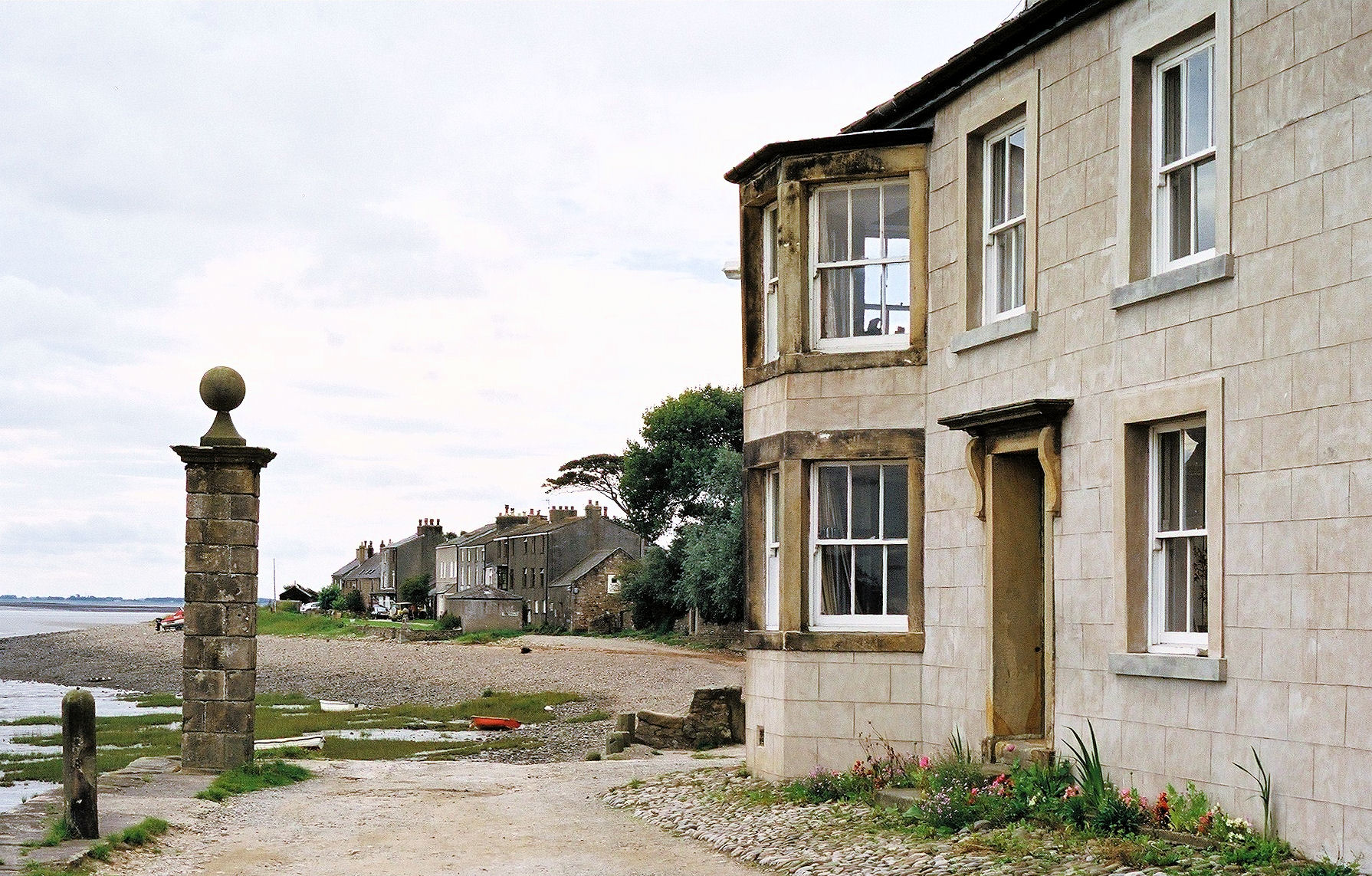
Sunderland view

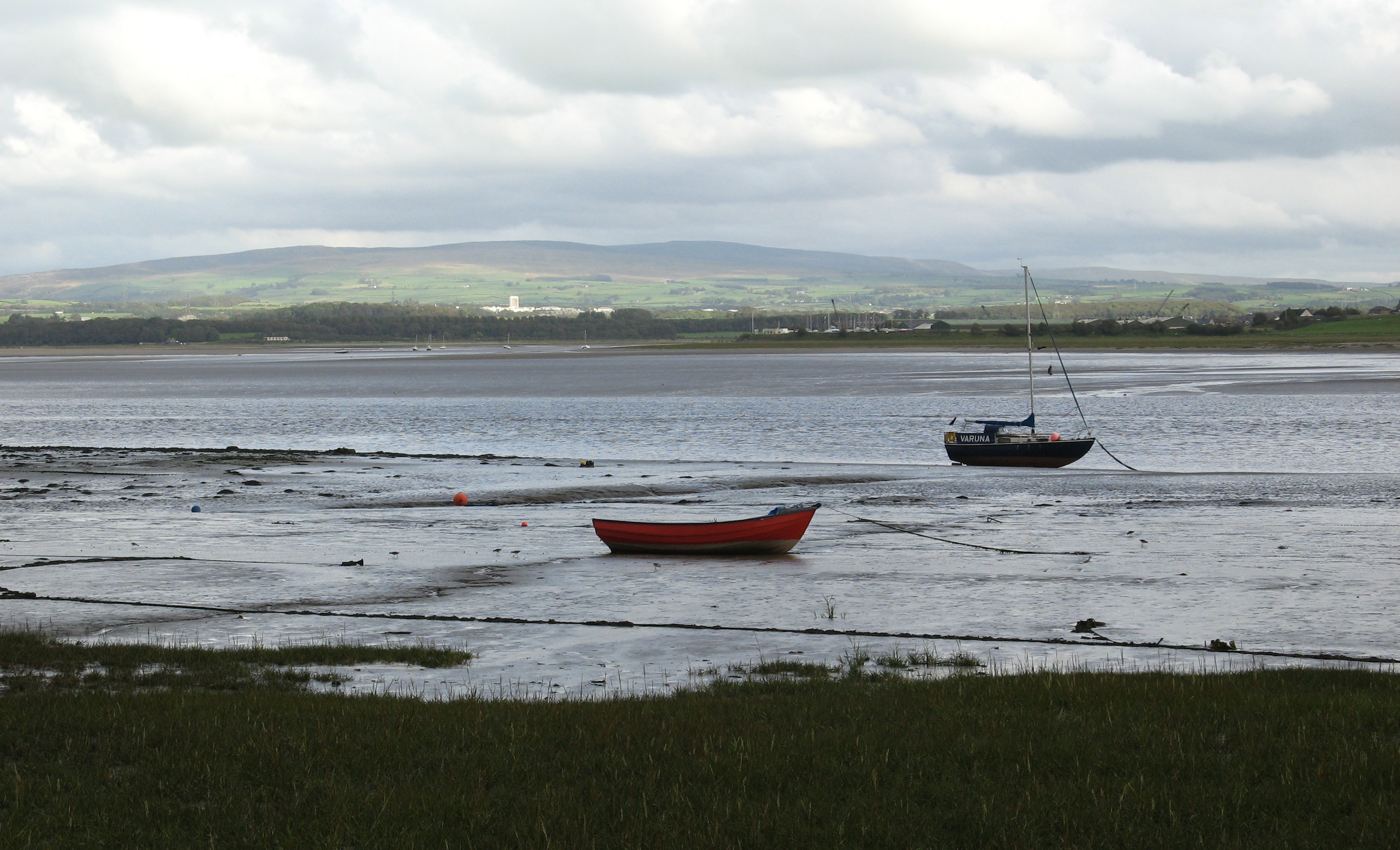
River Lune at Sunderland Point, looking towards Glasson Dock on opposite river bank

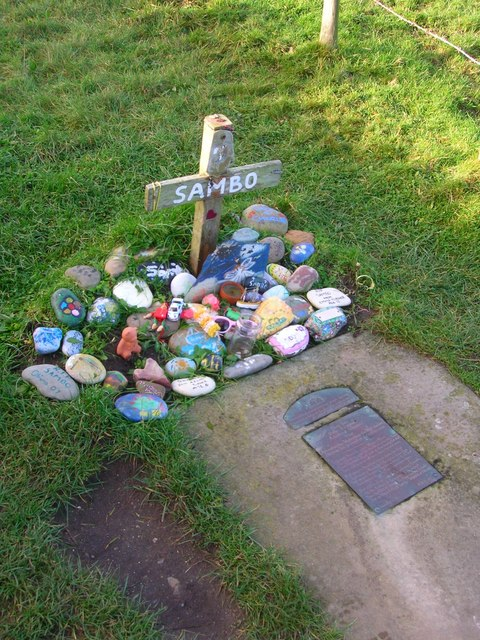
Sambo's Grave, west of the village

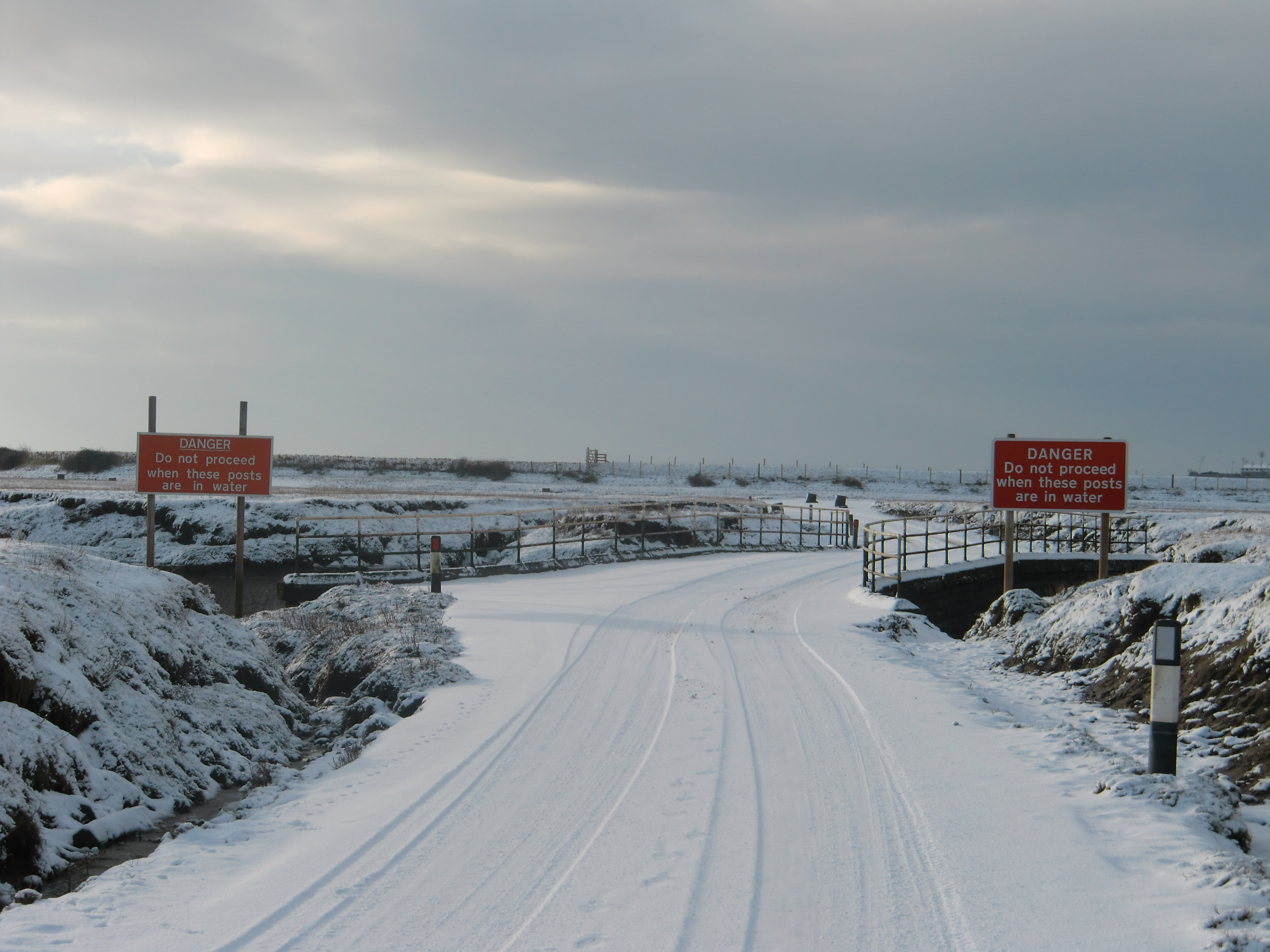
Sunderland point signs in snow

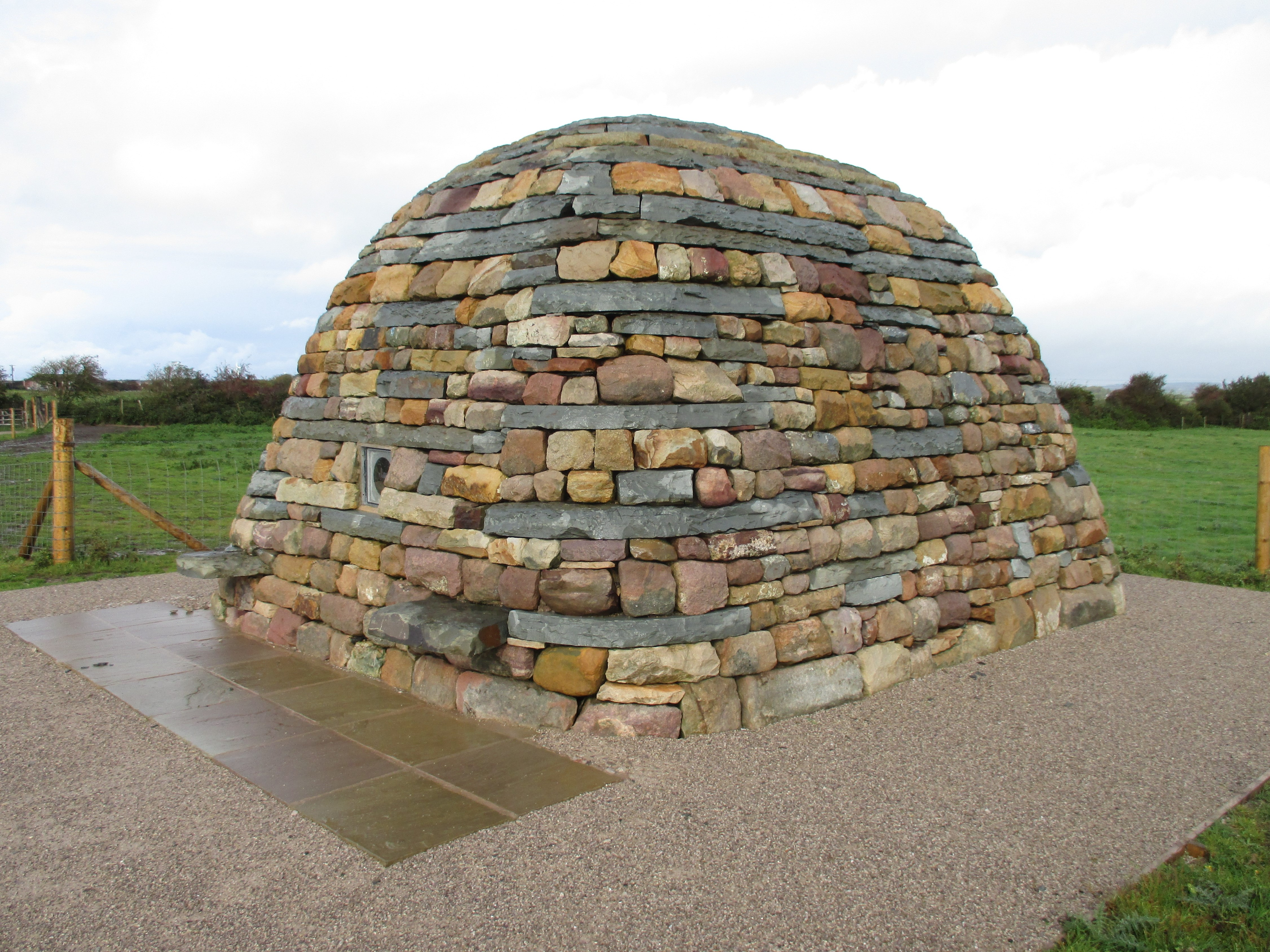
Horizon Line Chamber by Chris Drury, to the west of the village

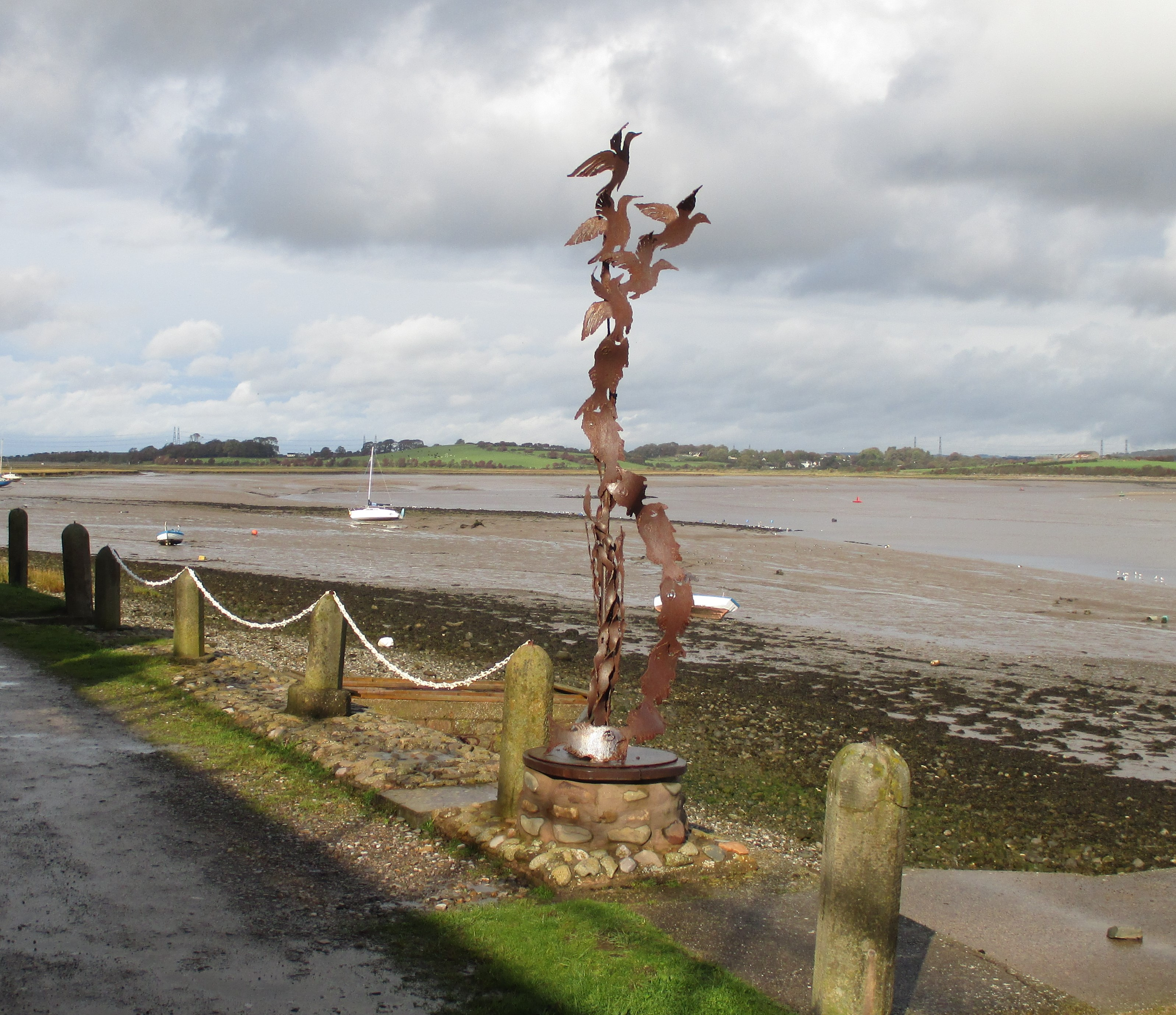
Sculpture by Ray Schofield on the wharf at Sunderland Point

== See also ==
- Listed buildings in Overton, Lancashire
