= St Helen's Church, Overton =

Coordinates: 54.0113°N 2.8545°W

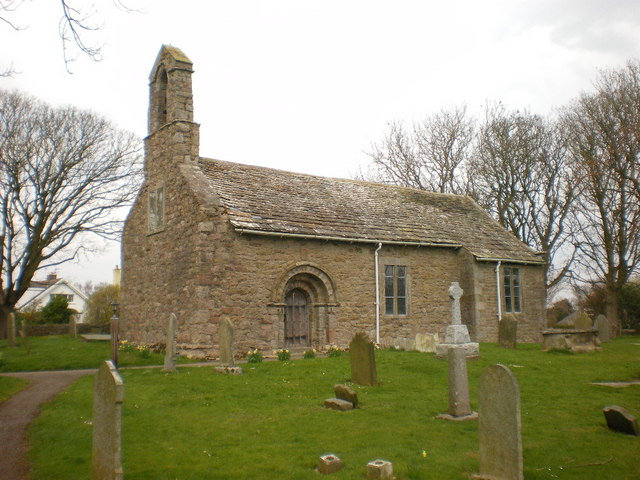
- St Helen's Church, Overton, from the southwest

- Location in the City of Lancaster district
- OS grid reference: SD 441,576
- Location: Church Grove, Overton, Lancashire
- Country: England
- Denomination: Anglican
- Churchmanship: Central
- Website: St Helen, Overton

History
- Status: Parish church

Architecture
- Functional status: Active
- Heritage designation: Grade II*
- Designated: 2 May 1968
- Architect(s): William Coulthard (1830); Austin and Paley (restoration)
- Architectural type: Church
- Style: Norman, Gothic

Specifications
- Materials: Sandstone, stone slate roofs

Administration
- Province: York
- Diocese: Blackburn
- Archdeaconry: Lancaster
- Deanery: Lancaster and Morecambe
- Parish: Overton

Clergy
- Priest: In vacancy

St Helen's Church, Overton, is located in Church Grove, Overton, Lancashire, England. It is an active Anglican parish church in the deanery of Lancaster and Morecambe, the archdeaconry of Lancaster, and the diocese of Blackburn. The church is recorded in the National Heritage List for England as a designated Grade II* listed building.

== History ==
The oldest parts of the church date from the 12th century. In 1771 it was partly rebuilt, resulting in a chancel wider than the nave. A long north transept was added in 1830, the architect being William Coulthard. A restoration of the church was carried out by the Lancaster architects Austin and Paley in 1902, when they removed plaster from the walls, added new floors, steps and seat, repaired the roof, and inserted stone mullions in three windows. This work cost £650 (equivalent to £85,000 in 2025). During the course of the restoration the architects discovered the foundation of an earlier canted apse at the east end.

== Architecture ==
St Helen's is constructed in sandstone rubble, with a stone slate roof. Its plan consists of a nave, a wider chancel, and a north transept containing the organ and a vestry. At the west end is a bellcote, beneath which is a plain two-light window. There are similar windows on the north and south sides of the nave and on the south wall of the chancel. On the south side of the church is a Norman doorway, with badly eroded carving. Above the doorway is a plaque, also eroded. The east window has a semicircular head with a keystone. The windows in the transept are tall, with mullions and round heads. Inside the church there are galleries at the west end, and in the transept. On the east wall are boards painted with the Ten Commandments and the Lord's Prayer. The pulpit, with its sounding board, dates from the 18th century. The sandstone font is octagonal on a square base.

== External features ==
In the churchyard, to the south of the church is a sandstone cross base and part of its shaft, probably dating from the medieval era. The churchyard also contains the war graves of an airman of World War I, and an airman and a Wren of World War II.

== See also ==
- Grade II* listed buildings in Lancashire
- Listed buildings in Overton, Lancashire
- List of ecclesiastical works by Austin and Paley (1895–1914)
