= Cape Farewell, UK =

UK cultural response to Climate Change

Cape Farewell is a UK-based artist-led organisation that works to respond to climate change. Launched by David Buckland in 2001 with a series of artist- and scientist-manned expeditions to the Arctic, Cape Farewell is an international not-for-profit programme based at The WaterShed, in Dorset.

Cape Farewell aims to change the way people think about climate change, and to widely communicate, educate and inspire action on the need for urgent, and achievable, change. Cape Farewell engages with creative, scientific and visionary people, working with clean technology entrepreneurs, sociologists and universities towards achieving a non-carbon society.

In 25 years, Cape Farewell has supported over 350 artists and over 60 climate scientists in the research and creation of artworks. For example, Marcus Coates' 'The Sound of Others' opened the Manchester Science Festival in partnership with the Museum of Science and Industry (MOSI) in 2014; Guy Martin installed Forcey's Tower, Dorset, 2014; Sabrina Mahfouz completed her poetry residency with performances at the London School of Economics and the Southbank Centre; and SWITCH showcased young climate poets in partnership with the Royal Shakespeare Company, Stratford.

Cape Farewell partners with cultural institutions (for example, the Natural History Museum, Science Museum, Tidal Lagoon Swansea, Tate, Eden Project, the Royal Academy, the National Maritime Museum and the Southbank Centre) to create artworks that explore climate change and promote conversation about environmental sustainability.

== Expeditions ==
Cape Farewell uses expeditions – Arctic, island, urban and conceptual – to look into the scientific, social and economic realities that lead to climate disruption.

Since 2003 Cape Farewell has led eight expeditions to the Arctic, two to the Scottish Islands, and one to the Peruvian Andes, including two youth expeditions, taking creatives such as land artist Chris Drury, scientists, educators and communicators to experience the effects of climate change first hand.

Discoveries found on the trips are recorded and relayed through scientific experiments, live web broadcasts, film, events, exhibitions and the overall insights of artists and educators. These expeditions resulted in a varied body of artworks, exhibitions, publications and educational resources. Each journey is a catalyst for all subsequent activity.

An expedition was made in September 2008 to Disko Bay on the west coast of Greenland, in partnership with the National Oceanography Centre, Southampton, The University of Southampton and British Geological Survey. Scientists onboard extended their investigations into climate whilst artists, writers, and communicators kept blogs posting their response. The crew included musicians Jarvis Cocker, Leslie Feist, Laurie Anderson, Vanessa Carlton, Robyn Hitchcock, Ryuichi Sakamoto, KT Tunstall, Martha Wainwright, Luke Bullen, and beatboxer Shlomo, comedian Marcus Brigstocke, composer Jonathan Dove, theatre makers Mojisola Adebayo, Suzan-Lori Parks, visual artists Kathy Barber, David Buckland, Sophie Calle, Jude Kelly, Michèle Noach, Tracey Rowledge, Julian Stair, Shiro Takatani, Chris Wainwright, architects Francesca Galeazzi, and Sunand Prasad, poet Lemn Sissay, photographer Nathan Gallagher, BBC presenter Quentin Cooper, Senior Lecturer (Open University), Joe Smith, activist David Noble, media executive Lori Majewski and film director Peter Gilbert. Oceanographers included Simon Boxall, Emily Venables and geoscientists Carol Cotterill and Dave Smith.

== Arts programme ==
From these expeditions has sprung a large body of artwork, including:

- An exhibition curated with the Natural History Museum that toured to the Barbican Art Gallery, International Department. The exhibition comprised a range of media including photographic work, video, installations, and prints from a selection of contemporary artists including Antony Gormley, Rachel Whiteread, Alex Hartley and the novelist Ian McEwan. The exhibition was last shown in Tokyo during the G8 meetings (July 2008) where it was opened by Sarah Brown, wife of then UK prime minister Gordon Brown.
- A film co-produced by the BBC Art from a Changing Arctic
- A book Burning Ice
- The CD ARCTIC by Max Eastley
- Educational resources for GCSE Geography and Science
- A UN award-winning website
- Ongoing arts and events programme.
