= Chris Drury (artist) =

British environmental artist

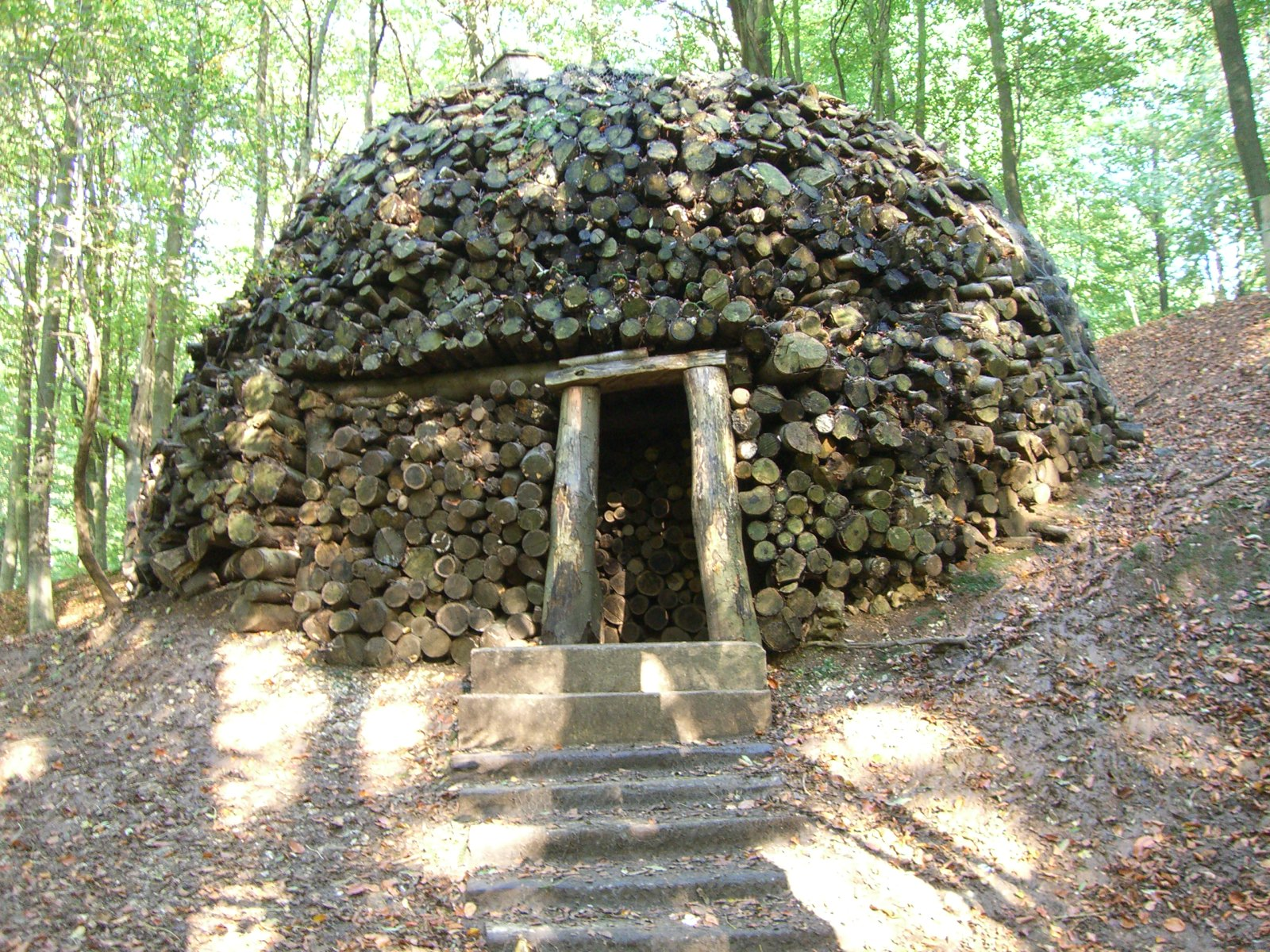
- Cloud Chamber
- Born: 1948 (age 76–77); Colombo, Sri Lanka
- Education: Camberwell School of Art
- Known for: Sculpture, installation, land art
- Notable work: Mushroom Cloud, 2010
- Awards: Pollock-Krasner Award, 1995; Pollock-Krasner Lifetime Achievement Award, 2018
- Elected: Royal British Society of Sculptors
- Website: chrisdrury.co.uk

Chris Drury (born 1948) is a British environmental artist. His body of work includes ephemeral assemblies of natural materials, land art in the mode associated with Andy Goldsworthy, as well as more permanent landscape art, works on paper and indoor installations. He also works in 3D (three-dimensional) sculpture.

== Biography ==
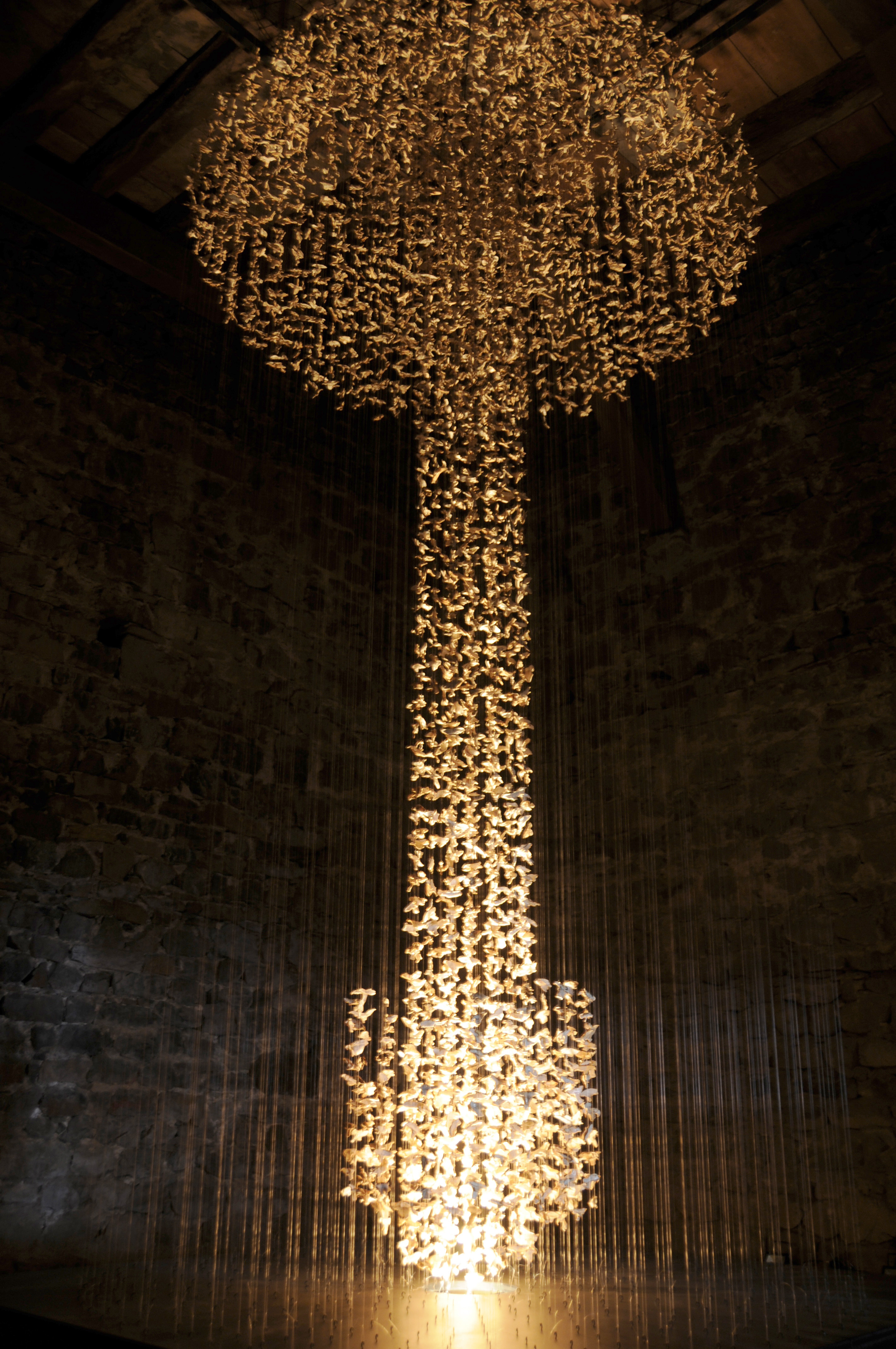
Mushroom Cloud by Chris Drury

Drury was born in Colombo, Sri Lanka in 1948, his family moving to the UK when he was 6 years old. From 1966, he attended Camberwell College of Arts (at the time known as Camberwell School of Arts and Crafts), studying art and sculpture, where he was taught drawing by artists such as Euan Uglow.

After being introduced to him by his dentist, in October 1975 he was invited to accompany walking artist Hamish Fulton on a journey through the Canadian Rockies which he describes as seminal in his transition from traditional sculpture and portraiture to environmental or land art.

Initially frustrated by comparisons of his work to leading land artists such as Fulton and Richard Long, his work continued to develop and in 1982 he made what he describes as a "radical departure" and spent a year creating Medicine Wheel in which he explored seasonal change and displayed objects from nature over the course of a year in the form of a large circle. Medicine Wheel was displayed through Coracle, a small independent gallery with whom Drury continued to work intermittently for a number of years, and was eventually given to Leeds City Art Gallery. Drury has largely continued to eschew traditional larger galleries, preferring to distance himself from commercial expectation and production which has allowed him a freedom to work in remote areas and in natural surroundings and to make art in a wide range of unusual collaborations.

== Artworks ==
In addition to ephemeral works, some of Drury's lasting pieces include "cloud chambers", darkened caverns constructed of local rock, turf, or other materials. Each chamber has a hole in the roof which serves as a pinhole camera; viewers may enter the chamber and observe the image of the sky and clouds projected onto the walls and floor. He has made several around the world, with his latest, Horizon Line Chamber, constructed with master craftsman Andrew Mason, opening in 2019 at Morecambe Bay as part of the Headspace to Headlands Heritage Lottery Commission.

From December 2006 to February 2007, he was artist in residence with the British Antarctic Survey where his work included creating ephemeral pieces with the materials of nature, including Wind Vortices, ice prints and ice igloos which he also photographed.

His works in 3D sculpture include mushroom clouds evoking nuclear testing made out of as many as 6000 pieces of fungi strung floor to ceiling. These were first exhibited at his first major solo exhibition in the US, Mushrooms | Clouds, at Nevada Museum of Art in 2008.

On paper, he uses a variety of unusual media, notably mushroom spore prints, dung, and peat, as a source of colour and patterns, which he might overlay with text or fingerprints, or underlay with maps or other geographic images.

Drury has also produced works associated with the body, working in residence with hospitals and incorporating echocardiogram data and blood into his art.

Drury is an active participant in several organisations which aim to address the effects of and challenge thinking about climate change through art, including Cape Farewell, UK, ONCA (a Brighton based charity which "supports artists and audiences to engage with environmental and social challenges" and Art Works for Change, which creates exhibitions worldwide to advocate for human rights, social justice and to highlight environmental awareness.

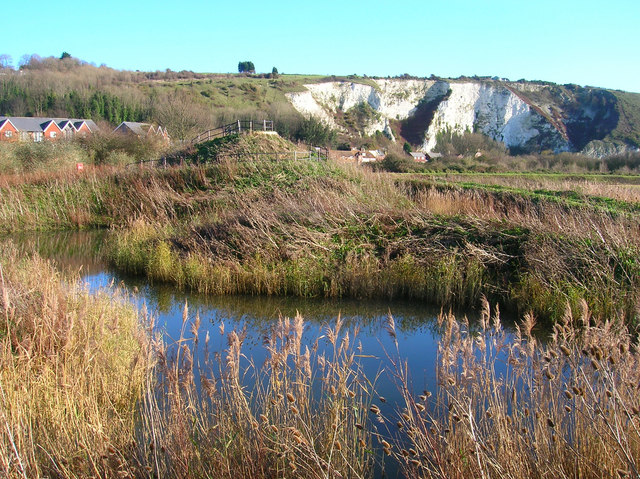
Heart of Reeds, Lewes

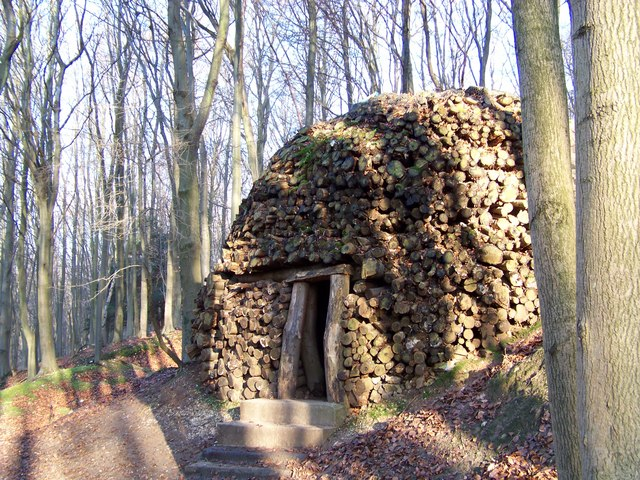
Coppice Cloud Chamber

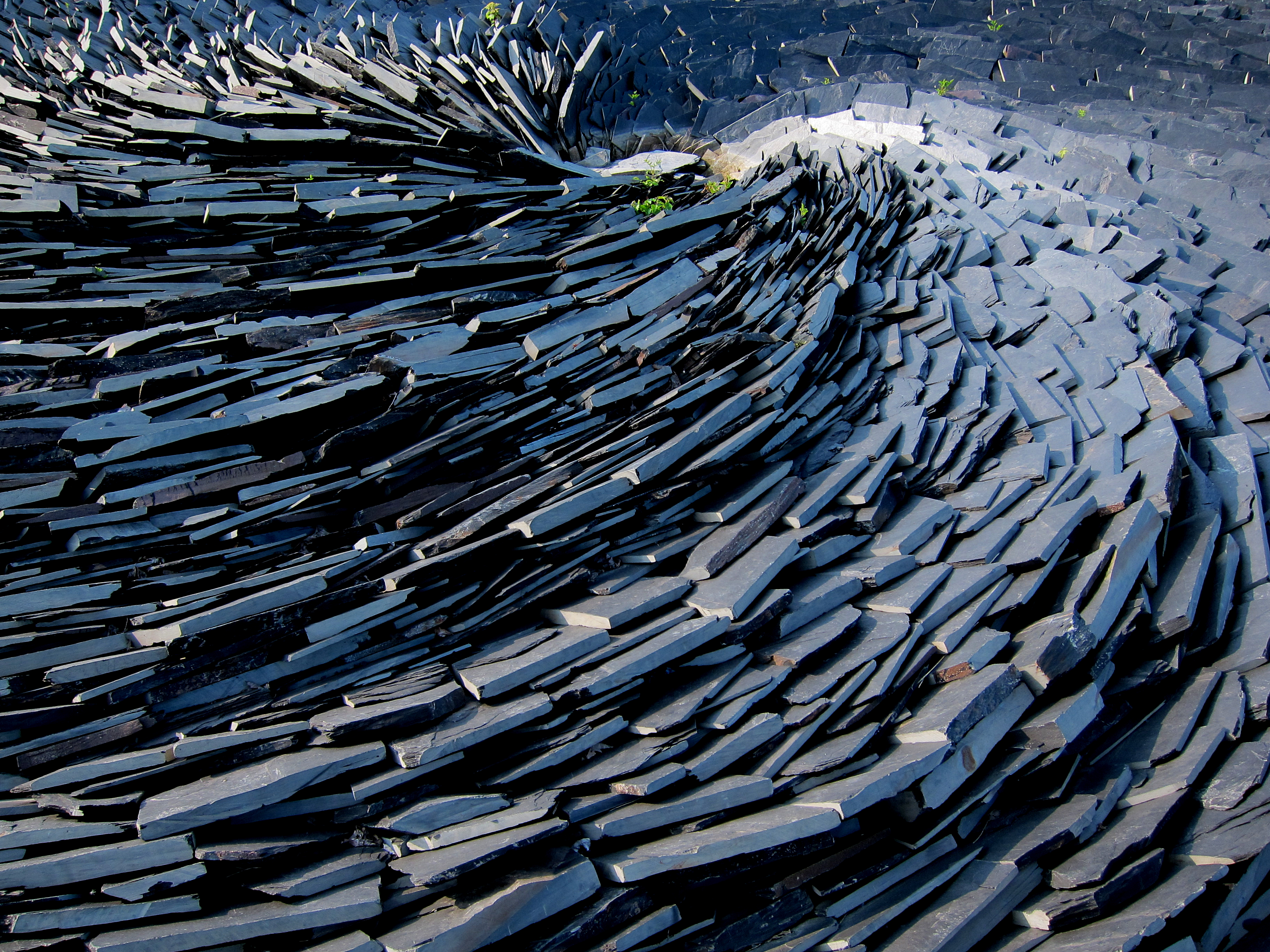
Moselle Rhine Whirlpool

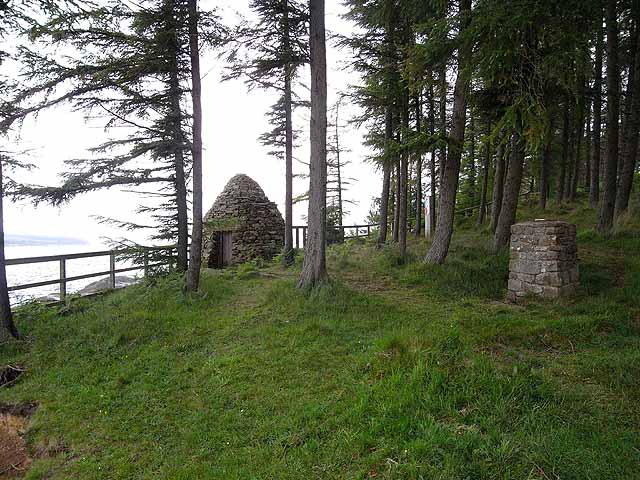
Wave Chamber, Hexham

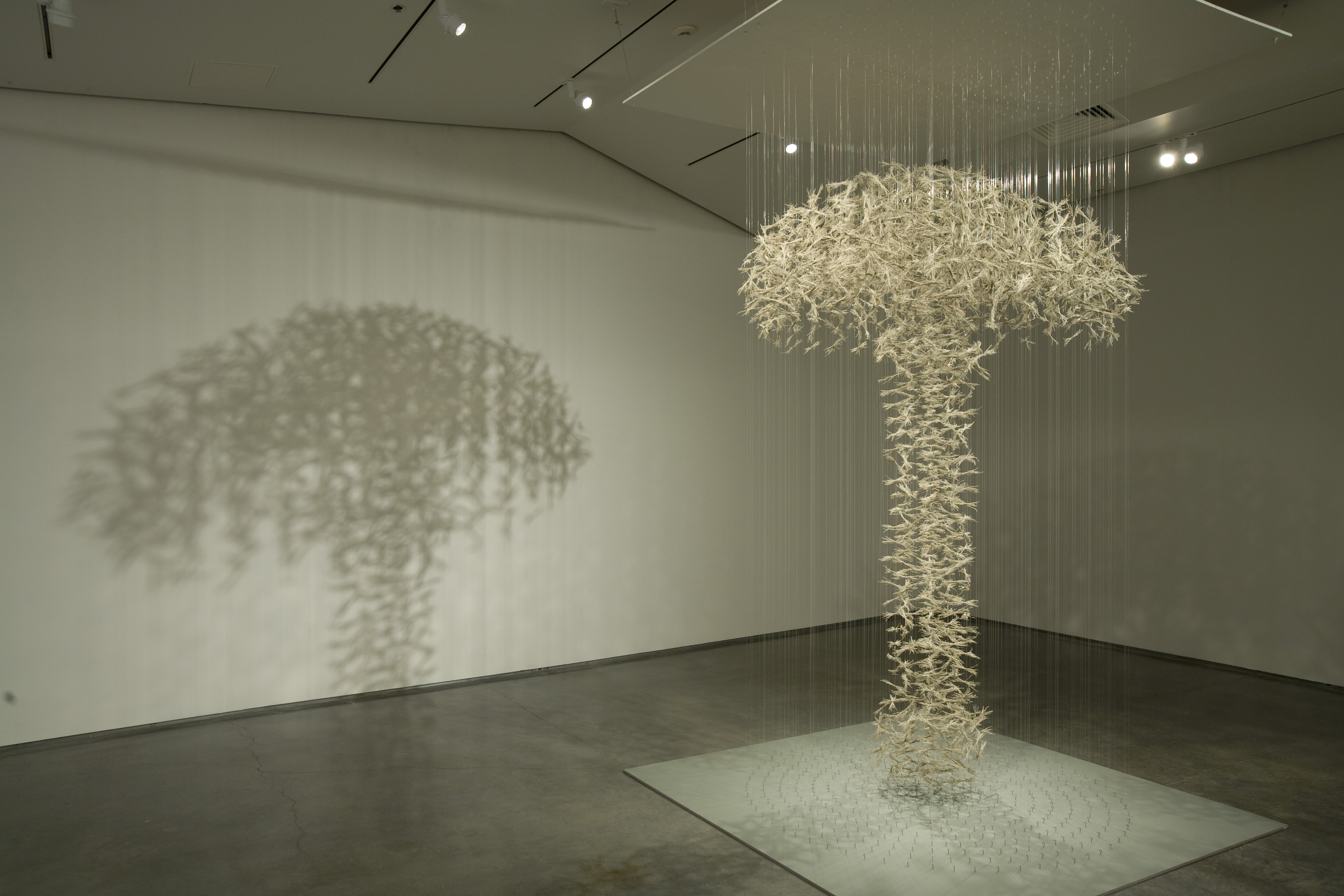
Destroying Angel Sage by Chris Drury

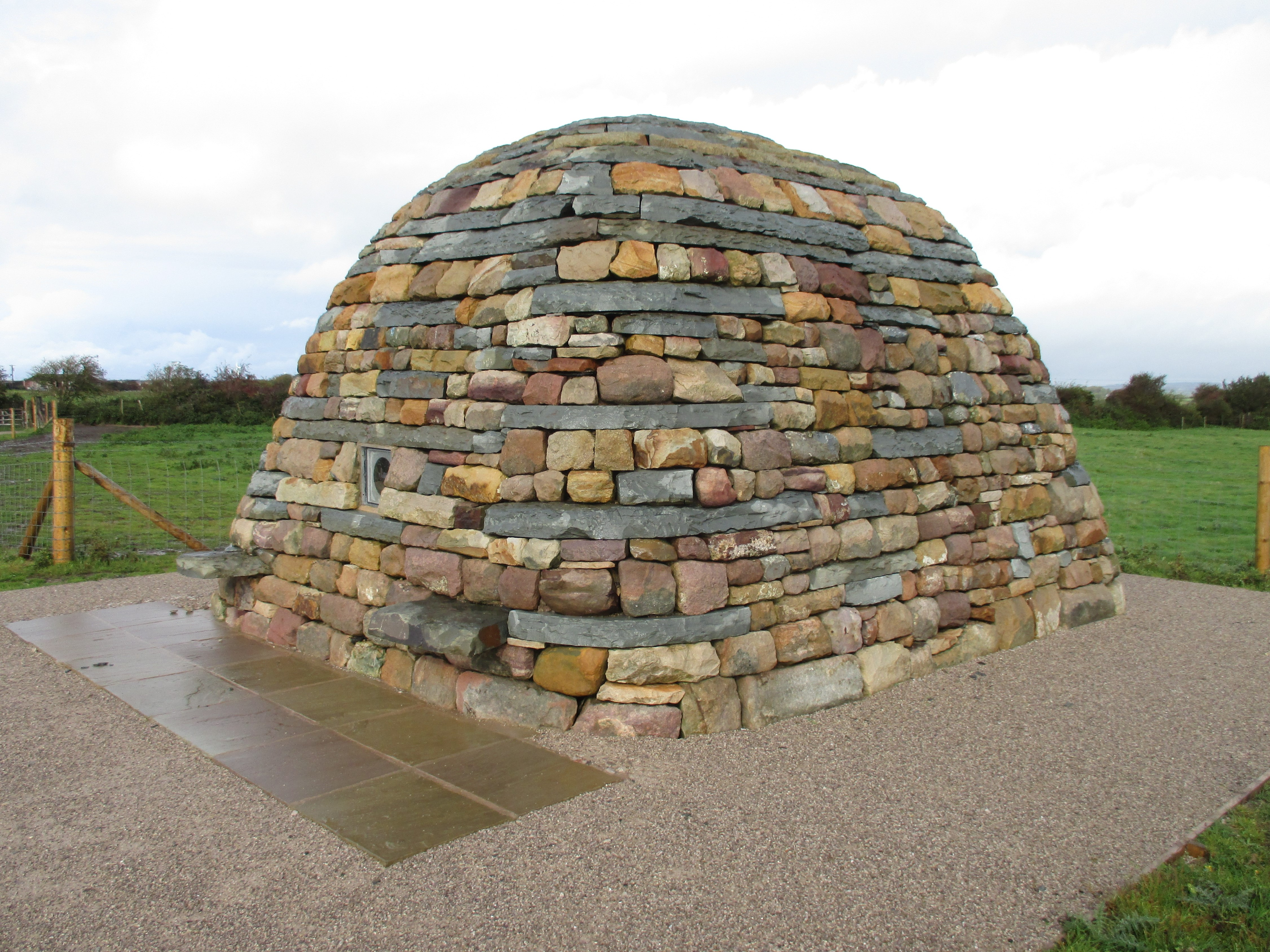
Horizon Line Chamber, near Sunderland Point, Lancashire

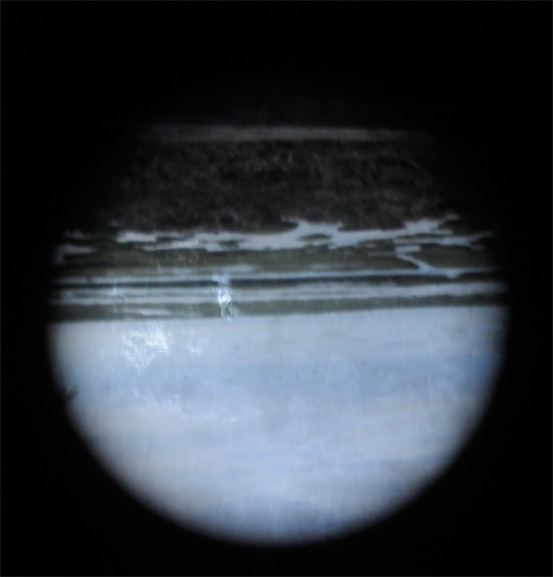
Photograph made inside Horizon Line Chamber by Chris Drury - using it as a camera obscura

=== Carbon Sink at the University of Wyoming ===
In 2011, Drury's outdoor artwork titled Carbon Sink created controversy when it was installed at the University of Wyoming and was ultimately censored. The sculpture was constructed of coal and burned wood and was intended to highlight the link between climate change and environmental issues in Wyoming, and the specific issue of Wyoming forests extensive infestation with pine beetle.

Complaints were received by the president of the university, Tom Buchanan, from members of the public, mining executives, Republican lobbyists and other representatives of energy industries who were aggrieved that the university displayed the sculpture whilst receiving considerable funds from state taxes. Tom Lubnau, Republican speaker of the Wyoming House of Representatives, stated he would attempt to ensure "no fossil-fuel-derived tax dollars find their way in the University of Wyoming funding stream". The sculpture was removed on Buchanan's recommendation, with the initial reason given as water damage, which the later release of Buchanan's emails contradicted. Subsequently, legislation was passed that means any proposed artwork at the university must "reflect Wyoming's history of transportation, agriculture and minerals" and be approved by the Wyoming Energy Resources Council, made up of local energy executives, and by Republican governor of Wyoming, Matt Mead. The university was criticised for backing down in the face of commercial pressure, with one professor describing the artwork's removal as an "explicit and abhorrent act of censorship".

== Publications ==
- Drury, Chris (1998). Chris Drury - Silent Spaces. Introduction by Kay Syrad. Thames and Hudson. ISBN 978-0500092767. Also ISBN 0-8109-3246-6.
- Land Art. Tate, 2007. Ben Tufnell.
- Chris Drury Mushroom|Clouds. Anne M Wolfe Centre For American Places/University of Chicago Press, 2009. ISBN 978-1-935195-02-3.
- Song of The Earth: European Artists and the Landscape. Thames & Hudson, 2007. Mel Gooding and William Furlong. UK edition.
  - Artists Land Nature. Harry N. Abrams. USA edition.
- The Ethics of Earth Art. University of Minnesota, 2010. Amanda Boetzkes.
- Antarctica – Exhibition Catalogue. Drill Hall Gallery, Australian National University, 2012. Drury, Philip Hughes, Bea Maddock, Anne Noble, Sydney Nolan, Jan Senbergs, Jorg Schmeisser. ISBN 978-0-9808044-7-8.
- Art and Ecology Now. Thames & Hudson, 2014. Andrew Brown. ISBN 978-0-500-23916-2.
- Exchange. Cape Farewell, UK, 2015. Drury and Syrad. Handmade, A2 Leather-bound book. Edition of 3 copies.
  - Exchange. Cape Farewell and Little Toller. Drury and Syrad. Hardback small version, with inserted artwork. ISBN 978-1-908213-34-1.
  - Exchange. Cape Farewell and Little Toller. Drury and Syrad. Paperback version. ISBN 978-1-908213-34-1.

== Exhibitions ==
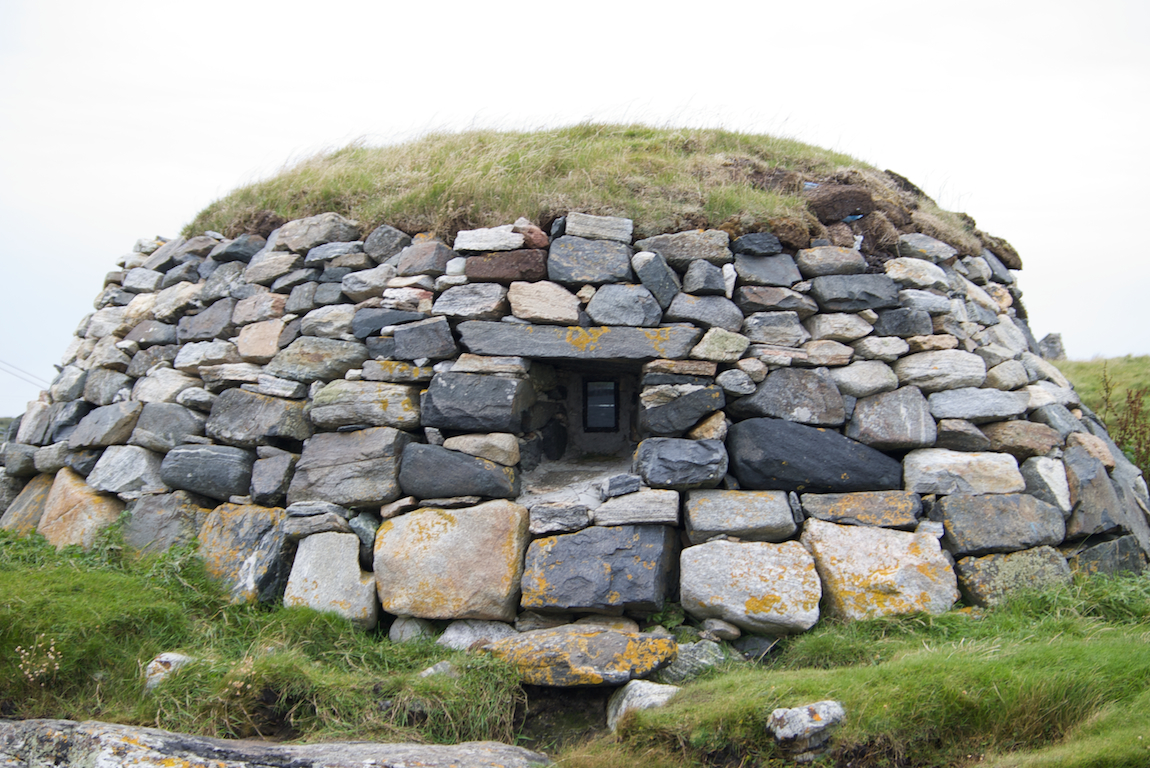
The Hut of the Shadows, Lochmaddy.

- Mushrooms | Clouds, Nevada Museum of Art, Reno, Nevada, 2008. Solo exhibition.
- Mushroom Cloud, Arte Sella, Borgo Valsugana, Italy, 2010. Installation and videos.
- Water, Land and Language, Taigh Chearsabhagh, Lochmaddy, Western Isles, Scotland, 2010
- Land, Water and Language, Dovecot Studios, Edinburgh, 2011
- Chris Drury, Lloyds Club Gallery, London, 2014
- Chris Drury, Oppland Art Centre, Lillhammer, Norway, 2014. Mini retrospective and installation.
- Exchange, Fine Foundation Gallery, Durlston Castle, Swanage, 15–31 August 2015. A Cape Farewell project with writer Kay Syrad about three farms in West Dorset. The exhibition included a large leather bound book and several works on the wall representing a year's research.
- Earth, Onca Gallery, Brighton, 10 March – 3 April, 2016. Solo exhibition.

== Awards ==
In 2018, Drury was awarded the Lee Krasner Lifetime Achievement Award by the Pollock-Krasner Foundation.
