= A6 road (England) =

North-south road in England

A6

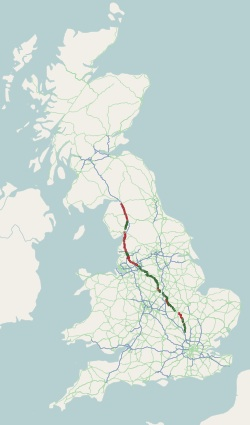

Route information

Major junctions
- South end: A505 in Luton; 51.8782°N 0.4080°W

- A421 near Bedford; A45 near Higham Ferrers; A14 near Kettering; A46 near Leicester; M1 / A50 near Kegworth; A52 in Derby; A38 near Derby; A580 near Salford; M61 near Atherton; A58 to M61 near Westhoughton; A6027 to M61 near Horwich; A674 to M61 near Chorley; M6 / M65 near Preston; M55 to M6 near Preston; M6 near Lancaster; A683 near Lancaster; A6070 to M6 near Carnforth; A590 near Levens; A591 near Kendal; M6 near Shap; A66 near Penrith; M6 near Carlisle
- North end: A7 in Carlisle; 54.8954°N 2.9311°W

Location
- Country: United Kingdom
- Constituent country: England
- Primary destinations: Bedford; Kettering; Market Harborough; Leicester; Loughborough; Derby; Matlock; Buxton; Stockport; Manchester; Salford; Preston; Lancaster; Kendal; Penrith

Road network
- Roads in the United Kingdom; Motorways; A and B road zones

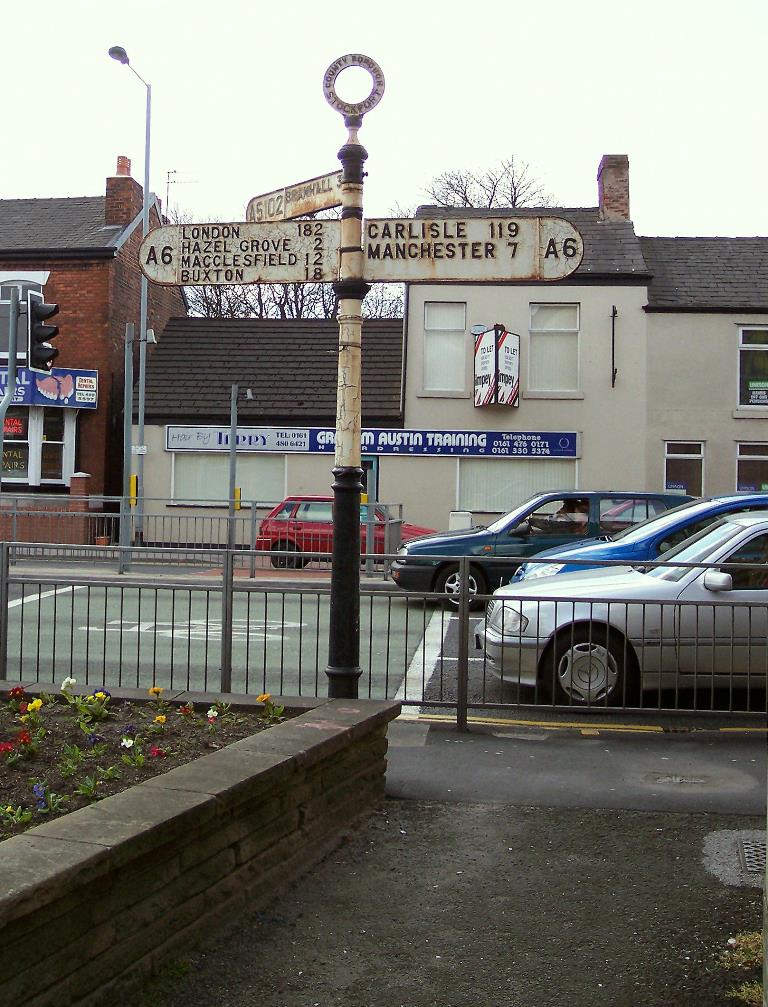
Signpost in Stockport, seen in 2006, showing A6 distances to London (182 miles) and Carlisle (119 miles)

The A6 is one of the main north–south roads in England. It runs from Luton in Bedfordshire to Carlisle in Cumbria, although it formerly started at a junction with the A1 at Barnet in north London, and is described as running from London to Carlisle.

Running north-west from Luton, the road passes through Bedford, bypasses Rushden, Kettering and Market Harborough, continues through Leicester, Loughborough, Derby and Matlock before passing through the Peak District to Bakewell, Buxton, Stockport, Manchester, Salford, Chorley, Preston, Garstang, Lancaster, Kendal and Penrith before reaching Carlisle.

South of Derby, the road runs approximately parallel to the M1 motorway; between Manchester and Preston, it is close to the M6 and M61 motorways; and from Preston to its northern terminus in Carlisle, it is close to the M6.

== Route ==
The A6, which runs from Luton to Carlisle is known as the London to Carlisle trunk road.

=== Luton–Kettering ===
The A6 begins as a short stretch of Crawley Green Road at an elongated roundabout with the A505 road – part of the Luton inner ring road. The A6 follows Crescent Road past Luton railway station into New Bedford Road. It meets the A5228 outer ring road at a roundabout. On the outskirts of Luton, now Barton Road, it meets the Icknield Way Path. Leaving Luton, it enters Central Bedfordshire after a roundabout with Quantock Rise.

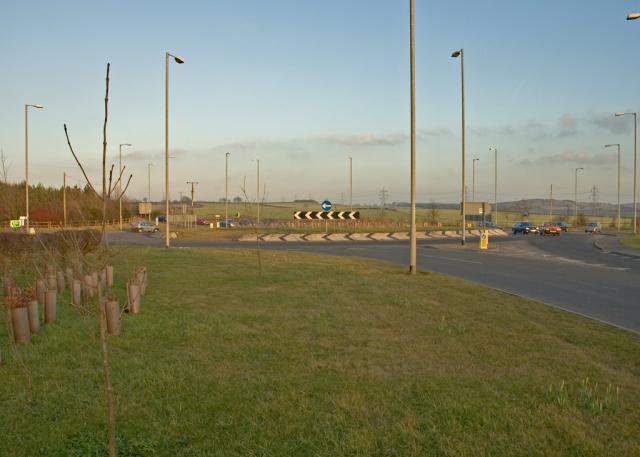
Barton-le-Clay bypass near Streatley

A roundabout at Streatley, where the road becomes the dual-carriageway Luton Road, passing through the Bartonhill Cutting, the road becomes single carriageway at the roundabout with the B655 at the other end of the Barton-le-Clay bypass. It meets the A507 at a roundabout at Clophill, crossing the River Flit. It passes by Maulden Wood as the dual-carriage up Deadman's Hill then passes Haynes West End. It enters the district of Bedford and bypasses Wilstead. It meets the A421 at the Elstow Interchange grade-separated junction (GSJ). The A6 meets the A5134 at a large signal-controlled junction.

The road crosses the Marston Vale Line and enters Bedford as Ampthill Road. There is a roundabout with the A5141, then it crosses the railway again near Bedford St Johns railway station. It meets the A600 and A5140 at a roundabout, then passes Bedford College and crosses the River Great Ouse as King Street. It takes two one-way routes (Tavistock Street–High Street and Horne Lane–Union Street) through the town centre, which meet at a roundabout, then continues for around 700 yards. It meets the A5141 again at a roundabout near Bedford Modern School and a large Sainsbury's supermarket and becomes the dual-carriageway Paula Radcliffe Way; it formerly passed through Clapham itself before the construction of the Paula Radcliffe Way Bypass in 2001.

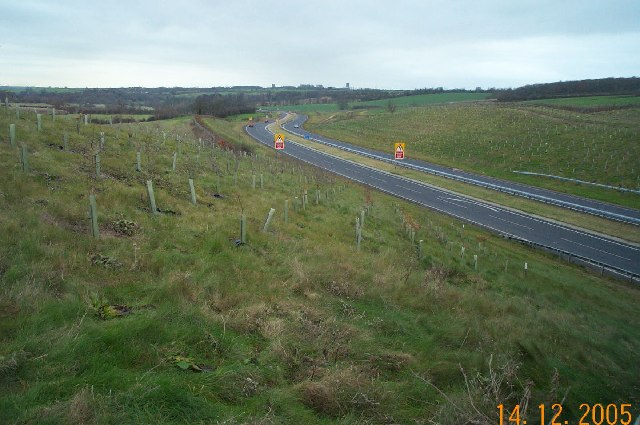
Clapham bypass near Oakley

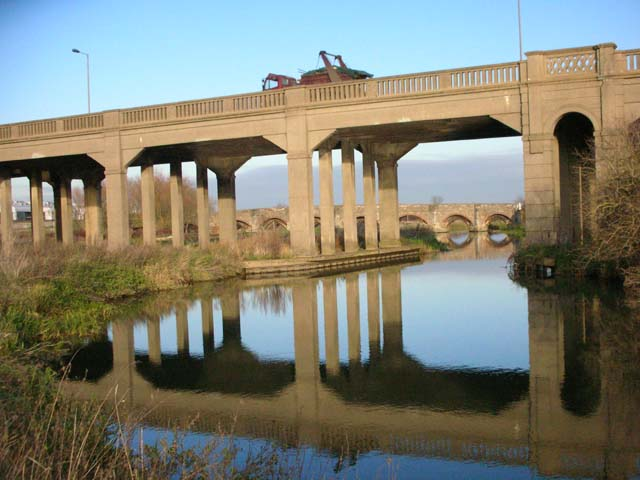
Irthlingborough Viaduct built over the Nene in 1936

The A6 crosses the River Great Ouse twice more, and is crossed by the John Bunyan Trail, near a GSJ for Clapham and Oakley. There is another GSJ for Highfield Parc Industrial Estate. At the end of the bypass, the road loses the broad expanse of tarmac and looks like a minor B road and becomes Bedford Road where there are speed cameras. It passes through Milton Ernest, passing the Queen's Head pub and the exit for Yarl's Wood Immigration Removal Centre. It then continues for around three miles, passing the Falcon pub near Bletsoe then passes Sharnbrook at a roundabout. Around a mile later it crosses into Northamptonshire and enters the district of North Northamptonshire. It passes through the village of Wymington, and passes the exit to the Santa Pod Raceway, bypasses the towns of Rushden and Higham Ferrers, arriving at the Chown's Mill roundabout with the A45. From here the road bridges the River Nene and the Nene Way before bypassing Irthlingborough. The A6 then passes through the town of Finedon and intersects the A510 at a roundabout. Leaving Finedon, the road passes the Burton Wold Wind Farm and bypasses Burton Latimer and arrives at junction 10 of the A14 at Barton Seagrave.

=== Kettering–Leicester ===
Kettering was bypassed when sections of the east–west corridor A14 were built. The A6 reappears at junction 3 of the A14, from there it continues north bypassing Rothwell and Desborough until it meets a roundabout with the B576 (the pre-bypass former A6 route through Desborough and Rothwell). The road enters Leicestershire and the district of Harborough as Harborough Road at the start of the five-mile (8 km) Market Harborough Bypass. It briefly re-enters Northamptonshire where there is a roundabout with the A427 (for Stoke Albany) and A4304 (former A427), and an exit for Great Bowden.

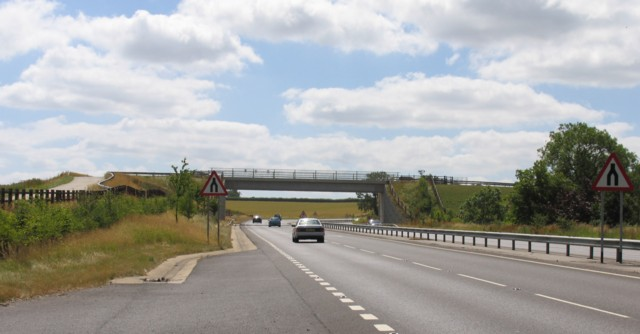
Southern end of the Great Glen bypass looking south

The road is crossed by the Leicestershire Round. There is a turn for Foxton and Foxton Locks. It is crossed by the Midland Main Line. The A6 passes through Kibworth. The road becomes Leicester Road. It crosses the River Sence and there is a roundabout. The bypass ends with a roundabout, just before the road enters the district of Oadby and Wigston.

=== Leicester–Peak District ===
On the outskirts of Leicester the road becomes London Road. There is a roundabout with Florence Wragg Way, where the road becomes Glen Road. It then becomes Leicester Road before reaching the outer ring-road (A563), next to Leicester Racecourse. It becomes London Road, where the dual-carriageway ends, and it enters the city of Leicester, passing Leicester High School for Girls. There is a crossroads, for Stoughton Road (A6030) at Stoneygate, and a roundabout with the Victoria Park Road (B568). It passes close to Leicester University and many take-away shops. It crosses the Midland Main Line near Leicester railway station. In the centre of Leicester, it is subsumed into Leicester's inner ring-road, the A594.

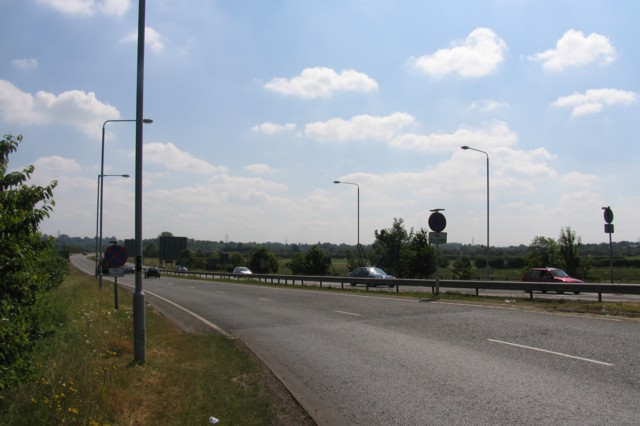
Quorn-Mountsorrel bypass north of Leicester

The A6 crosses the Grand Union Canal and the River Soar as St Margarets Way. It becomes dual-carriageway on the northern outskirts of Leicester and passes the National Space Centre in Belgrave as Abbey Lane. Later, it meets a roundabout with the A563 outer ring-road entering the borough of Charnwood. North of Leicester, as Loughborough Road, it meets the A46 Leicester Western Bypass just south of Rothley and the start of the four-mile (6.4 km) dual-carriageway Quorn-Mountsorrel Bypass. The road at this point follows the Soar Valley, and is mostly on embankment or viaduct, crossing the river four times. From here the road passes through Loughborough. North of Hathern is a dual-carriageway section that skirts the Leicestershire–Nottinghamshire border (the River Soar). The road becomes London Road and enters the district of North West Leicestershire. To the south of Kegworth the road heads west along a bypass avoiding the village. It joins the A453 at the East Midlands Gateway industrial park. The A453 then joins the M1 at the roundabout at junction 24, which is where the A50 Derby to Stoke-on-Trent Link begins. The road follows one of the former A6 dual-carriageway sections, passing Lockington, before meeting traffic from the south-bound M1 at junction 24a. The three-laned A6 overlaps the A50 for a couple of miles, and there is a junction with the B6540 (former A453). The road crosses the Trent and Mersey Canal and River Trent, where it enters Derbyshire and the district of South Derbyshire.

Elvaston Castle is to the east. The road enters Derby along London Road and at Alvaston it meets the A5111 Derby Ring Road (Raynesway). It enters Crewton and just after a hump-backed bridge it passes St Osmund's Church. There is a roundabout with Ascot Drive near the Derby Conference Centre, and the road exits as Pride Parkway, which is connected to the adjacent Pride Park Business Park and Pride Park Stadium, home of Derby County F.C. It reaches Litchurch near Derby College's Roundhouse site; the land on which it was built was a former gas works. This section from the first roundabout to Station Approach (B6000) includes a 900-foot (270 m) viaduct with 180-foot (55 m) spans over the Midland Main Line. The A6 meets a former route beside the Derbion shopping centre, a former roundabout that was replaced with traffic lights with a multi-storey car park in the centre. The road overlaps the A601, Derby's inner ring-road and the A52, crossing the River Derwent, then leaving as King Street at an intersection on St Alkmund's Way near the former site of St Alkmund's Church. This section to the A38 has a weight limit. As Garden Street, it splits in two at an elongated roundabout surrounding a service station and a pub. At a roundabout known locally as the Five Lamps, it becomes Duffield Road. North of Derby, there is the Palm Court roundabout (named after the former Palm Court café which closed in 2005), a junction with the A38. It follows the Derwent Valley, entering the district of Amber Valley through Duffield and Belper. At Whatstandwell it meets the B5035 (for Crich and Wirksworth), then enters the district of Derbyshire Dales. At Cromford, it meets the A5012 (Via Gellia) before passing Matlock Bath. Entering Matlock, the road passes under the railway and along a new bypass and then over the River Derwent, meeting the A615 at a roundabout. The road then continues on Bakewell Road into Darley Dale, where the road, as Dale Road, passes the hospital, and crossroads with the B5057.

=== Peak District–Manchester ===
From Matlock the road enters the Peak District National Park. From Rowsley, it follows the River Wye, meeting the B5056 near the endpoint of the River Lathkill. It passes Haddon Hall and enters Bakewell, meeting the B5055 and A619 at a roundabout. At Ashford-in-the-Water, there is a junction with the A6020 (for Baslow). The road passes through Taddington Dale. Taddington has a dual-carriageway bypass. There are junctions with the B6049 (for Blackwell) and A5270, and it enters the district of High Peak and passes under four railway bridges. It enters Buxton as Bakewell Road and meets the B5059 at a roundabout. It leaves Buxton as Fairfield Road, and heads towards Stockport slightly north-east to Dove Holes and to a roundabout with the A623.

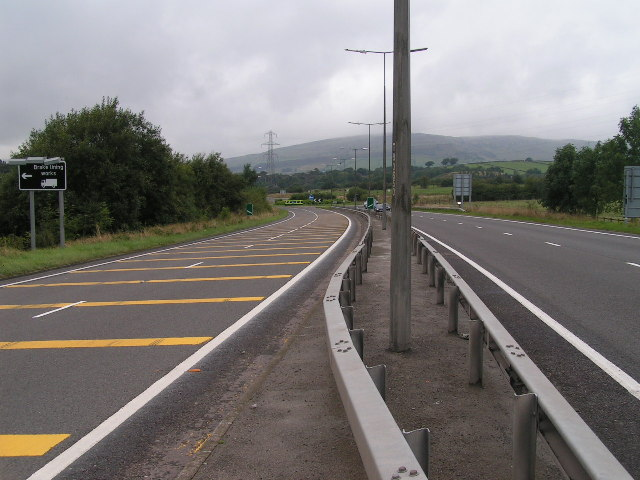
The A6 near Chapel-en-le-Frith

The four-mile (6.4 km) part-dual-carriageway Chapel-en-le-Frith and Whaley Bridge bypass passes a roundabout with the A624 to Glossop on the left and ends with a roundabout with the A5004 for Whaley Bridge and Macclesfield (via the B5470). It crosses the Peak Forest Canal and the B6062 leads to Chinley, then goes under the Buxton Line. At Furness Vale it passes the railway station and the primary school. It meets the A6015 at New Mills (Newtown) for the town centre, near the railway station and primary school, where the road enters Cheshire. At Disley on Market Street, the road passes the police station then crosses the Buxton Line near the railway station. At High Lane, the road enters the Borough of Stockport in Greater Manchester.

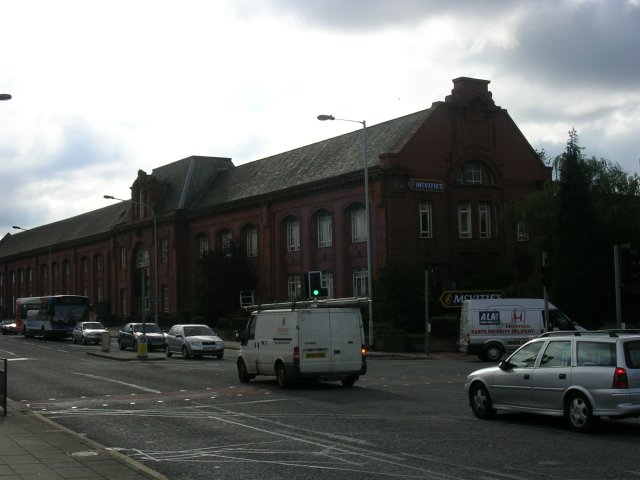
Passing the McVitie's factory where Stockport meets Manchester

Towards Stockport, the road becomes Buxton Road. In Stepping Hill, it goes near the hospital. At Mersey Square, Stockport just before the road crosses the M60, the road becomes Wellington Road North and crosses the Stockport to Stalybridge Line. At Heaton Chapel, there are crossroads with the B5169 (for Reddish), and the A626 joins to the right. It enters the city of Manchester just before it meets the B6178 and becomes Stockport Road. Near the junction with the B5093 is Levenshulme railway station. It goes under the railway and meets the A5079 (Slade Lane) from the south. There are crossroads with the A6010, and the A5184 leaves. In Longsight, it meets the A665 Manchester inner ring road and the A57 at a roundabout, which it overlaps until it goes under the A57(M)/A635(M), passing the University of Manchester.

=== Manchester city centre–Chorley ===
As it passes Manchester Piccadilly station it is called London Road, the previous name of the station, before becoming Piccadilly at Ducie Street. It continues north-west towards Piccadilly Gardens, a major public square and bus station. To the immediate right of this point is the Northern Quarter, an eclectic and bohemian neighbourhood containing cafes, bars and alternative stores. Here, Piccadilly becomes Market Street, a pedestrian commercial avenue, and the A6 designation is discontinued. It then resumes at Chapel Street after crossing the River Irwell. The road crosses the River Irwell at the A56, besides the medieval quarter of Manchester, containing Manchester Cathedral, Chetham's Library, the oldest free public library in the world, and Victoria station. Here the road is called Chapel Street as it leaves Manchester City Centre and enters Salford. Where the original Salford Royal Hospital stands (now flats) at its junction with Adelphi Street, its name changes to the Crescent. Along this stretch the road passes the University of Salford, and Salford Museum and Art Gallery, and the Working Class Movement Library, as well as Salford Crescent railway station near the junction with Albion Way. It then continues as the dual carriageway Broad Street through Pendleton and past the junction with Langworthy Road (A5186). At Irlams o' th' Height it departs from the dual carriageway, at the terminus of the A580 East Lancashire Road, at the border of Pendlebury. It becomes Manchester Road through Pendlebury for a short distance passing both the site of the former Royal Manchester Children's Hospital and Hospital Road. The road enters Swinton and passes Victoria Park opposite the junction with Barton Road. Along Chorley Road the road passes Swinton Post Office and Salford Civic Centre, at the town centre's crossroads with the B5231. The road heads north-west towards Linnyshaw and Walkden.

The road passes under the M60 near the junction with the M61, near the Worsley Braided Interchange and Wardley Hall (home of the Roman Catholic Bishop of Salford) and enters Whittle Brook and Walkden as Manchester Road, passing the Linnyshaw Industrial Estate on the right. The A6 meets the A575 (for Worsley and Farnworth) and B5232 (for Boothstown) at crossroads where the road is dual-carriageway as High Street. It becomes Manchester Road East and continues towards Little Hulton. It meets the A5082 (for Tyldesley and Farnworth) at crossroads near St Paul's Church, Peel, becoming Manchester Road West.

On leaving Little Hulton, the road enters the Borough of Bolton near the Chloride Battery Works. Near Farnworth, the road meets the M61, at junction 4, which closely follows parallel with the A6 up to Preston. The road is now the primary route Salford Road and meets the A579 at crossroads at Hulton Lane Ends becoming Manchester Road. It meets the A58 at a roundabout at Chequerbent and is no longer a trunk road. Close to M61 junction 5, the A6 enters Westhoughton. Then it crosses the Manchester to Southport railway line and meets the B5236 at Wingates near St John's Primary School and the St. John the Evangelist Church. On leaving Westhoughton, the road becomes Chorley Road. At Four Gates, there is the B5239 for Aspull. It meets the A6027 roundabout close to the M61 junction 6 for Horwich. It passes through Hilton House, at Scot Lane End, it meets the B5408 for Blackrod, becoming the Blackrod By-Pass Road. It meets the B5238, for Horwich, at crossroads near Blackrod railway station. Close by on the M61 is the Rivington services (formerly Bolton West services). It rejoins the old route where it meets the B5408.

Leaving Greater Manchester, it enters Adlington, Lancashire, and the district of Chorley where it crosses the River Douglas as Chorley Road, becoming Market Street. In the centre of Adlington it meets the B6227 near Adlington railway station, and the police station, becoming Church Street then Westhoughton Road. It crosses the Leeds and Liverpool Canal and meets the A673 from Bolton and A5106 from Standish.

It crosses the River Yarrow and passes the Albany Science College as Bolton Road. In Chorley, the central section is dual-carriageway with many roundabouts. It meets the B6228 at a roundabout, passes the railway station, then meets the A581 and B6229. It passes a hospital and meets the B5252 at a roundabout where it crosses the railway. The dual-carriageway A674 goes to Blackburn via the nearby junction 8 of the M61 and the Preston England Temple, a Mormon temple.

=== Chorley–Carnforth ===
From Chorley, it meets the B6229 and B5248 at Whittle-le-Woods, passing the St John the Evangelist Church and crossing the River Lostock. It enters Clayton-le-Woods and meets the B5256 (for Leyland) at a roundabout near Cuerden Hall. It passes through Clayton Brook and crosses the M65, entering the South Ribble district, near its western terminus. There are two roundabouts for the Walton Summit Industrial Estate, either of which lead to the Walton Summit Motorway. Next is a roundabout with the M6 at junction 29, which is now shared with the M65 where it becomes a trunk road. The roundabout was formerly the southern end of the Preston Bypass, Britain's first motorway. The road becomes dual-carriageway as it passes Bamber Bridge. There are crossroads with the northern terminus of the A49 then a roundabout with the A582 – where the road heads north as London Way, built in the 1980s to bypass Bamber Bridge and later widened. The start of the M65 is accessible only from this roundabout at junction 1a. It crosses the East Lancashire Line and meets the B5257 at a roundabout. It meets the B6230 at a roundabout at Dog Kennel Wood, crosses the River Darwen and meets the A675 at Walton-le-Dale, where the bypass ends.

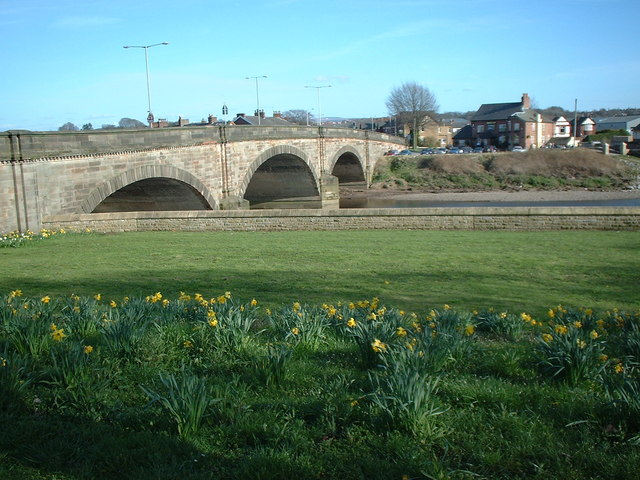
Crossing the River Ribble south of Preston

The A6 crosses the River Ribble and the Ribble Way, entering Preston district. It enters Preston as a single carriageway, meeting the A59 (for Blackburn), B6243 (for Ribbleton), and A6063. It passes through the centre of Preston, becoming North Road, meeting the A5071 (Moor Lane), then becoming Garstang Road. The A6 passes Moor Park and crosses the A5085 Blackpool Road. At Fulwood, it meets the B6242 at crossroads, then passes Sharoe Green. North of junctions with the B6241 Preston ring road, junction 1 of the M55 is a roundabout on the A6 connected by slip roads with the motorway above. This was formerly the northern end of the Preston bypass.

After the motorway, a 1.2-mile (2 km) bypass opened in 2017 takes the A6 east of Broughton, where it formerly met the B5269 at crossroads; the bypass, James Towers Way, is dual carriageway as far as the roundabout where the roads now cross and meets the former A6 at another roundabout. Through Barton, still as Garstang Road, it runs along the Preston and Wyre district boundary, converging with the West Coast Main Line and crossing the railway on a bridge. The district boundary crosses to the other side of the road and it enters the Borough of Wyre. It passes through Bilsborrow before leaving the district boundary, crosses the River Brock at Brock, and passes the site of a former railway station; a bridge carries the road over the Lancaster Canal. At Catterall, it meets the B6430 – the original A6 route – and crosses the River Wyre, and as Preston Lancaster New Road meets the A586 (for Churchtown). It enters Garstang and crosses the Lancaster Canal again. It meets the B5272 and B6430 – the original A6 coming back to meet us – and enters Cabus. At Forton, it passes close to the Forton service station on the M6. At Potters Brook, it meets a crossroads and enters the City of Lancaster. It meets the M6 at junction 33 and goes through Galgate as Main Road, passing under the West Coast Main Line, which it then runs adjacent to. The University of Lancaster lies in the 0.6-mile (1 km) separation between the A6 and the M6, where there is a short section of dual-carriageway on the A6 alongside the West Coast Main Line. The road enters Lancaster as Scotforth Road then Greaves Road.

It meets the A588 Ashton Road for Preesall at a roundabout, continues past the Royal Lancaster Infirmary on the left, then crosses the Lancaster Canal. It splits in two as it passes through the centre of Lancaster. It rejoins and splits again to cross the River Lune on the Greyhound Bridge and older Skerton Bridge. The A589 crosses for Morecambe and Caton and M6 junction 34. The road rejoins as Owen Road near Skerton Community High School and there is the B5231 for Morecambe, and a road for Halton. It crosses the Lancaster Canal and meets the A683 Heysham to M6 Link Road, and then heads through Hest Bank as Lancaster Road passing Bolton-le-Sands. It crosses the Lancaster Canal and meets the A5105 Coastal Road (from Morecambe) to the left at Bolton-le-Sands. Here the road is at its closest point to Morecambe Bay. It follows the Lancaster Canal and enters Carnforth as Lancaster Road and meets the B6254 which leads to M6 junction 35.

=== Carnforth–Carlisle ===
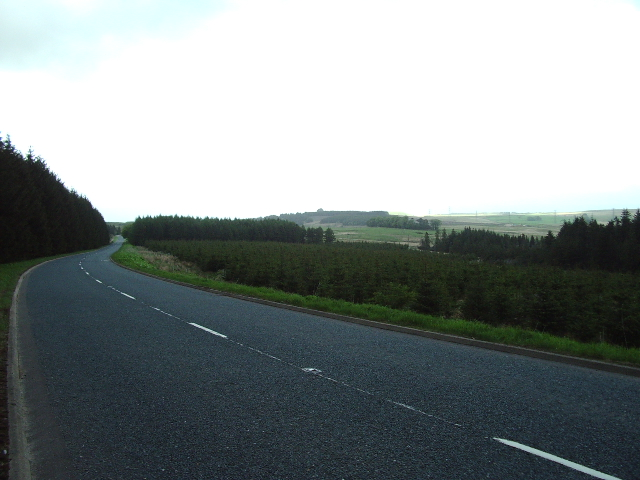
Near Shap

Leaving Carnforth, the A6 follows Scotland Road across the River Keer. It meets the former A601(M) at junction 35a of the M6 near Warton. There is a roundabout with the A6070, and the road, which has a short section of dual-carriageway, crosses the West Coast Main Line near Yealand Conyers. It enters Cumbria and the Westmorland and Furness unitary authority area near the Lakeland Wildlife Oasis Centre and Hale Moss. Nearby on the M6 is the Burton-in-Kendal services. It passes through Hale. At Beetham, it crosses the River Bela then passes through Milnthorpe as Beetham Road and Church Street, meeting the B5282 and B6385. It by-passes Heversham as Princes Way (built in 1927), passing by Levens Hall, crosses the River Kent at the old Levens Bridge. The A6 then meets the A590 and overlaps the A591 becoming a trunk road, the dual-carriageway Kendal bypass. It passes Sizergh Castle before leaving at a GSJ becoming the single carriageway Milnthorpe Road. It passes through Kendal, splitting in two, where it meets the northern end of the A65.

In Kendal, it passes Kendal College and the Queen Katherine School. It crosses the River Kent on the Nether Bridge and Miller Bridge. It passes under the Windermere Branch Line near Kendal railway station then meets the A685 (to Kirkby Stephen), passes over the River Mint as Shap Road and is crossed by the Dales Way. It briefly passes through the Lake District National Park. It crosses Borrowdale Beck (a tributary of the River Lune) and Huck's Bridge at Borrowdale, Westmorland.

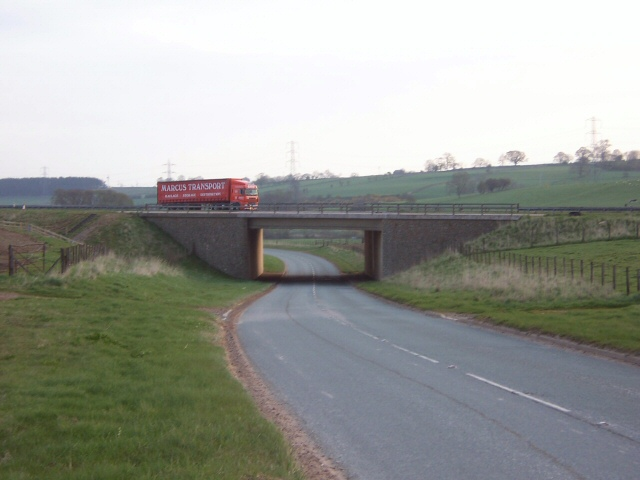
Passing under the M6 at Shap

The road climbs to over 1,350 feet (410 m) at Shap Summit, and heads over the Shap Fells into Wasdale where it leaves the National Park and passes the RMC granite works. A spur of the A6 meets the B6261 and joins the M6 at junction 39. The road is no longer a trunk road and passes the Corus lime kilns on Hardendale Fell and enters Shap where it is crossed by the Coast to Coast Walk, and over the West Coast Line. It passes under then over the M6, then passes close to Hackthorpe Hall and the Lowther Castle Inn. It passes over the M6 near Lowther, which is near the Lakeland Bird of Prey Centre. It passes over the railway at Clifton near Penrith. There is a turn for Brougham and it crosses the River Lowther at Eamont Bridge where it meets the B6262 and crosses the River Eamont over a narrow bridge. It meets the A66 at Kemplay roundabout next to Penrith Hospital.

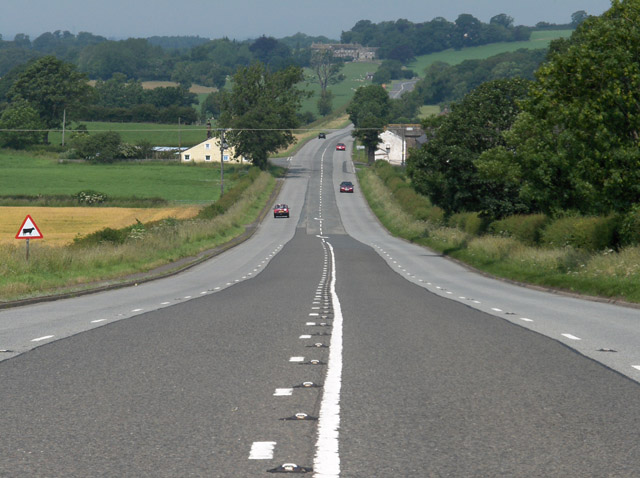
The Roman road section south of Carlisle

The A6 takes a central route through Penrith, entering the town as Bridge Lane then Victoria Road and leaving as 'Stricklandgate then Scotland Road. North of Penrith, it meets the B5305 (which heads to Wigton) at the Stoneybeck roundabout situated on a new section of the A6 built for junction 41 of the M6. The next section of the A6 is one of the most dangerous roads in the county and follows a former Roman road, having seen several deaths in the past few years.

This section through Inglewood Forest in Hesket civil parish follows a parallel path to the M6, and passes through Plumpton where it meets the B6413; an old Roman fort, Voreda, at Castlesteads Farm; High Hesket which it bypasses; Low Hesket; enters the Cumberland unitary authority area near Cotehill; and meets the M6 (and the B6263) at junction 42: the start of the Carlisle bypass. Entering Carlisle, it crosses the River Petteril (near a large radio mast) then the Tyne Valley railway line. The A6 travels through south-eastern Carlisle as London Road, before finishing at Botchergate in the centre of Carlisle where it transforms into the A7 which runs out of Carlisle and across the Anglo-Scottish border terminating at Scotland's capital city of Edinburgh.

== History ==
=== Former route south of Luton ===
The route of the old A6 south of Luton is now the A1081 for most of its length. In the initial road numbering scheme, the A6 started in Barnet where it joined what was then the A1 Great North Road. From Barnet the road went to London Colney, St Albans and Harpenden to join the current start of the road at Luton. At St Albans the road met the then A5 at a crossroads – the A5 arriving from the south-west and leaving the crossroads north-west, and the A6 arriving from the south-east and leaving to the north-east.

== Incidents ==
- A6 murder – the August 1961 murder of Michael Gregsten at a lay-by on the A6 in Bedfordshire, and the controversial trial and execution of James Hanratty for the crime.
