= St Luke's Church, Slyne with Hest =

Coordinates: 54.0877°N 2.8055°W

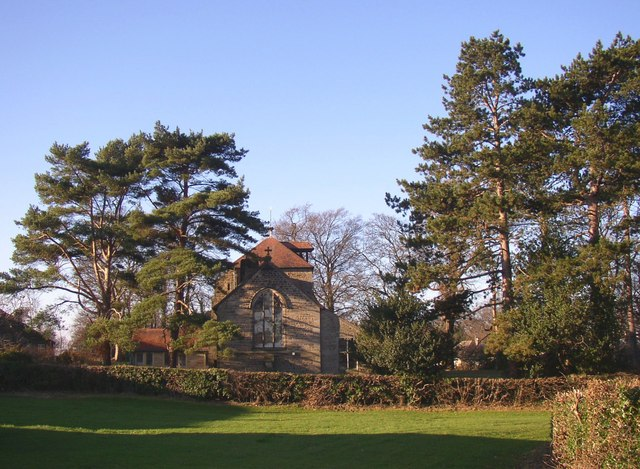
- St Luke's Church, Slyne with Hest, from the east

- Location in the City of Lancaster district
- OS grid reference: SD 474,661
- Location: Manor Lane, Slyne-with-Hest, Lancaster, Lancashire
- Country: England
- Denomination: Anglican
- Website: St Luke, Slyne with Hest

History
- Status: Parish church
- Dedication: Saint Luke

Architecture
- Functional status: Active
- Heritage designation: Grade II
- Designated: 7 November 1983
- Architect: Austin and Paley
- Architectural type: Church
- Style: Gothic Revival
- Groundbreaking: 1898
- Completed: 1900

Specifications
- Materials: Sandstone, tiled roofs

Administration
- Province: York
- Diocese: Blackburn
- Archdeaconry: Lancaster
- Deanery: Tunstall
- Parish: St. Luke Slyne with Hest

Clergy
- Vicar: Revd Susan Seed

St Luke's Church is in Manor Lane, Slyne-with-Hest, Lancaster, Lancashire, England. It is an active Anglican parish church in the deanery of Tunstall, the archdeaconry of Lancaster, and the diocese of Blackburn. Its benefice is united with those of St Saviour, Aughton, and St Wilfrid, Halton. The church is recorded in the National Heritage List for England as a designated Grade II listed building.

== History ==
The church was built between 1898 and 1900 to a design by the Lancaster architects Austin and Paley. It cost £2,358 (equivalent to £250,000 in 2025), and provided seating for 180 people. The church was originally a chapel of ease in the parish of Holy Trinity, Bolton-le-Sands, becoming a parish church in its own right in 1934.

== Architecture ==
St Luke's is constructed in sandstone rubble, with red tiled roofs and a timber porch. Its plan consists of a nave, a north aisle, a north porch, a chancel, and a tower at the crossing. The tower has a hipped roof, a buttress at the southwest, and a stair turret rising to a greater height than the tower at the south east. A wooden bellcote protrudes from the roof of the tower.

Inside the church is a three-bay arcade carried on circular piers. The tower has a flat ceiling, while the roofs of the nave and chancel are open. The font dates from 1905, is in white marble, and is in the form of an angel carrying a scallop shell.

== See also ==
- Listed buildings in Slyne-with-Hest
- List of ecclesiastical works by Austin and Paley (1895–1914)
