= Lune Aqueduct =

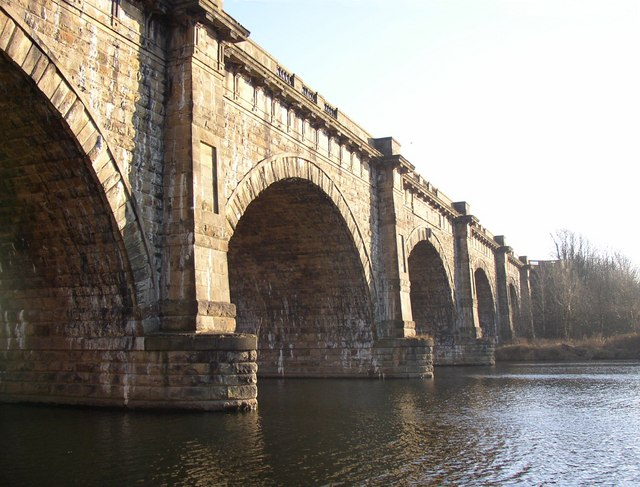
- Coordinates: 54.06838°N 2.78932°W
- OS grid reference: SD486636
- Carries: Lancaster Canal
- Crosses: River Lune
- Locale: Lancaster
- Maintained by: Canal & River Trust
- Preceded by: A683 bridge
- Followed by: Skerton Bridge

Characteristics
- Trough construction: Concrete
- Pier construction: Stone
- Total length: 664 ft (202.4 m)
- Width: 20 ft (6.0 m)
- Height: 61 ft (18.6m)
- Traversable?: Yes
- Towpaths: Both
- No. of spans: 5

History
- Designer: John Rennie
- Construction start: January 1794
- Opened: Autumn 1797

Listed Building – Grade I
- Official name: Lancaster Canal Lune Aqueduct
- Designated: 22 December 1953
- Reference no.: 1362451

Location
- Interactive map of Lune Aqueduct

The Lune Aqueduct is a navigable aqueduct that carries the Lancaster Canal over the River Lune, on the east side of the city of Lancaster in Lancashire, England. It was completed in 1797 at a total cost of £48,320 18s 10d. It is a Grade I listed building.

== Construction ==
The aqueduct was designed by civil engineer John Rennie and constructed by architect Alexander Stevens (died 1796, aged 66). The cost of the construction was close to £50,000.

The aqueduct is a traditional structure of that time, consisting of five stone arches supporting the stone trough. Within the piers, special volcanic pozzolana powder was imported to be mixed with cement, which allowed the concrete to set under water. Because of the rush to finish the initial stages, before the winter floods, the construction was carried out around the clock and the final bill for the project was over £30,000 over budget (2.6 times the original estimate). This vast overspend was the reason that the Lancaster canal was never joined to the main canal network – there wasn't enough money for the planned aqueduct over the River Ribble at the southern end of the canal.

== Recent restoration ==
Work began to restore the aqueduct in January 2011, and was completed in March 2012. The work involved restoring the canal channel, masonry repairs, removing graffiti, and improving public access. The project cost £2.4m, and was funded by British Waterways, Lancaster Canal Trust, English Heritage and the Heritage Lottery Fund.

== Inscriptions ==
The structure bears two inscriptions:

- North side: "To Public Prosperity"
- South side: "QUAE DEERANT ADEUNT: SOCIANTUR DISSITA: MERCES FLUMINA CONVENIUNT ARTE DATURA NOVAS. A.D. MDCCXCVII. ING. I. RENNIE EXTRUX. A. STEVENS. P. ET F." which can be translated as: "Things that are wanting are brought together / Things remote are connected / Rivers themselves meet by the assistance of art / To afford new objects of commerce. AD 1797. Engineer J Rennie. Built A Stevens father and son" (translated from the Latin)

== Gallery ==
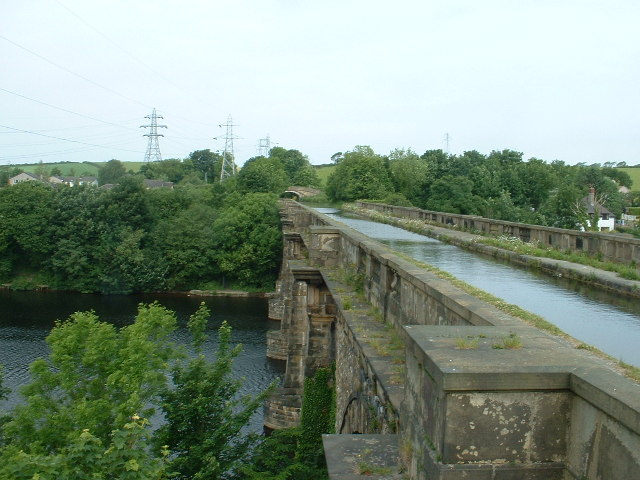
View along the Lune Aqueduct

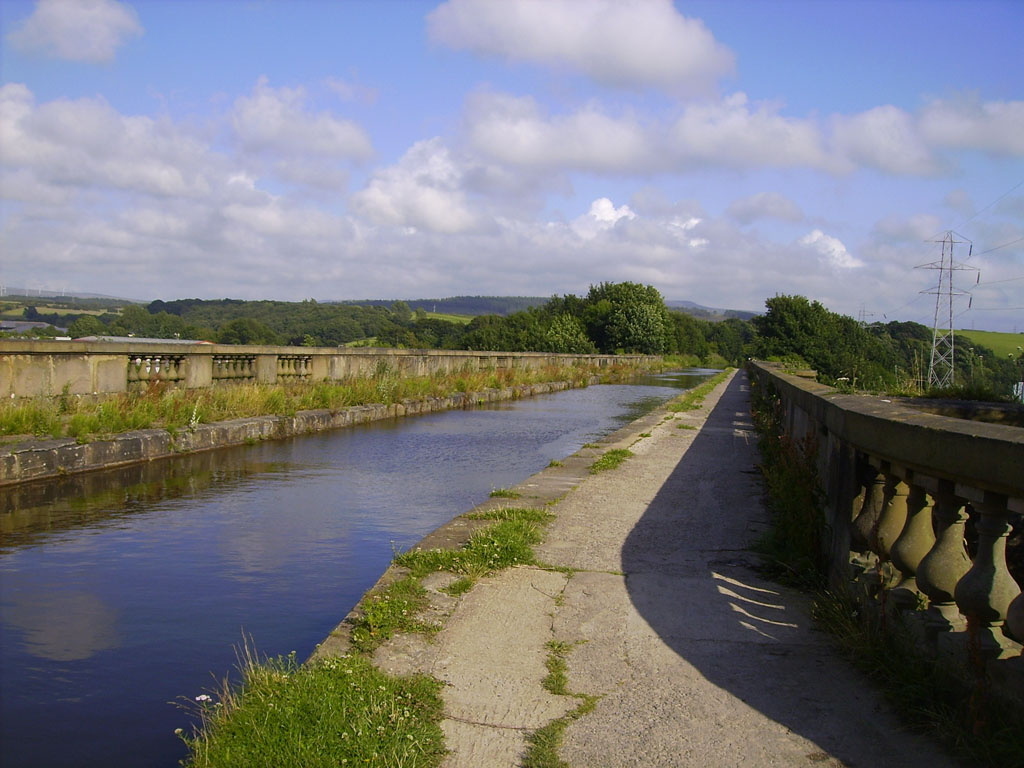
View from the towpath showing the ornate stone balustrades

== See also ==
- Grade I listed buildings in Lancashire
- Listed buildings in Halton-with-Aughton
- Listed buildings in Quernmore
- Canals of the United Kingdom
- List of canal aqueducts in the United Kingdom
