= Halton Cross =

Coordinates: 54.0758°N 2.7669°W

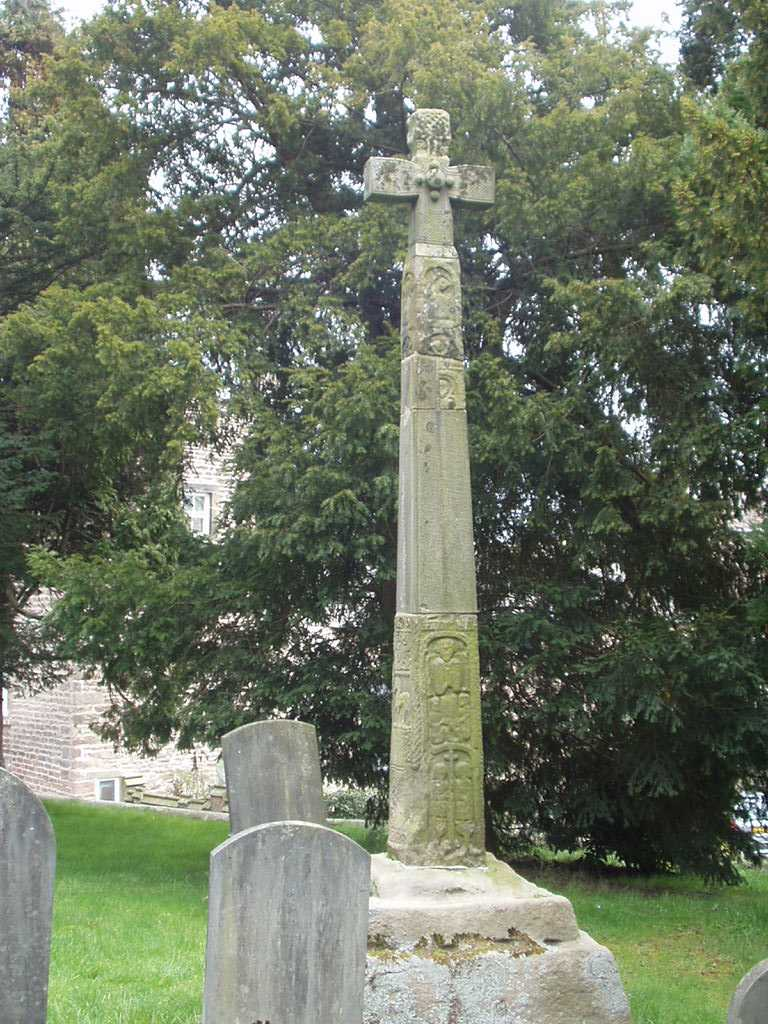

The Halton Cross, also known as Sigurd's Cross, is a composite high cross in the churchyard of St Wilfrid's Church, Halton-on-Lune, Lancashire. A 19th-century reconstruction, it comprises the remaining fragment of the original 10th- or 11th-century cross together with several 8th- or 9th-century fragments found locally. All feature carvings, some abstract and some representational. The carvings on the remains of the original cross, to be seen at the base of the shaft, show scenes from the legend of Sigurd, a part of the Germanic Nibelung tradition, together with Christian symbols. It has been called "an important survival from the twilight years when Christianity and paganism battled in the minds of men", and the archaeologist B. J. N. Edwards considered it "probably the clearest representation of part of the Sigurd story outside Scandinavia".

== History ==
The date of the carvings on the original cross is disputed. W. G. Collingwood and Sue Margeson both assigned them to the early 11th century, but more recently Richard N. Bailey has argued for a date in the 10th century. The other fragments used in the reconstruction are thought to date from the 8th or 9th century. The cross remained undisturbed until the reign of Charles I, when the Rev. Richard Jackson, rector of Halton, removed everything except its lower shaft, which he used as the pediment of a sundial inscribed "For Saint Wilfrite Church at Halton 1635" and "Perevunt et Imputantur" ([The hours] are consumed and will be charged [to our account]). In the early 19th century, illustrations of the cross in this form were first published as engravings in the anonymous Historical and Descriptive Account of the Town of Lancaster (2nd edition, 1811) and Thomas Dunham Whitaker's History of Richmondshire (1823).

In 1891 the sundial was moved to a new sandstone base in the same churchyard and the cross was reconstructed by the amateur antiquary W. S. Calverley using the lower shaft, four other fragments he mistakenly believed to have been part of the original cross, and modern stonework to connect them. Two of the ancient fragments were used to form the upper section of the cross shaft, one served as a socle at the bottom of the shaft, and the last served as one of the cross's four arms, namely the upper one.

On 12 February 1951 the cross was designated a scheduled monument as a nationally important archaeological site.

== Physical description ==
The base of the cross's three-stepped socle measures 1.4 metres (4.6 ft) by 1.5 metres (4.9 ft). The cross itself measures 3.6 metres (12 ft) from the base of the shaft, which is rectangular in horizontal cross-section, to the top of the cross-head. The overall height is 4.5 metres (15 ft). The material is local sandstone. Though the condition of the cross is on the whole reasonably good, the carvings are worn in places, and in part of one fragment they have been recut.

== The carvings ==
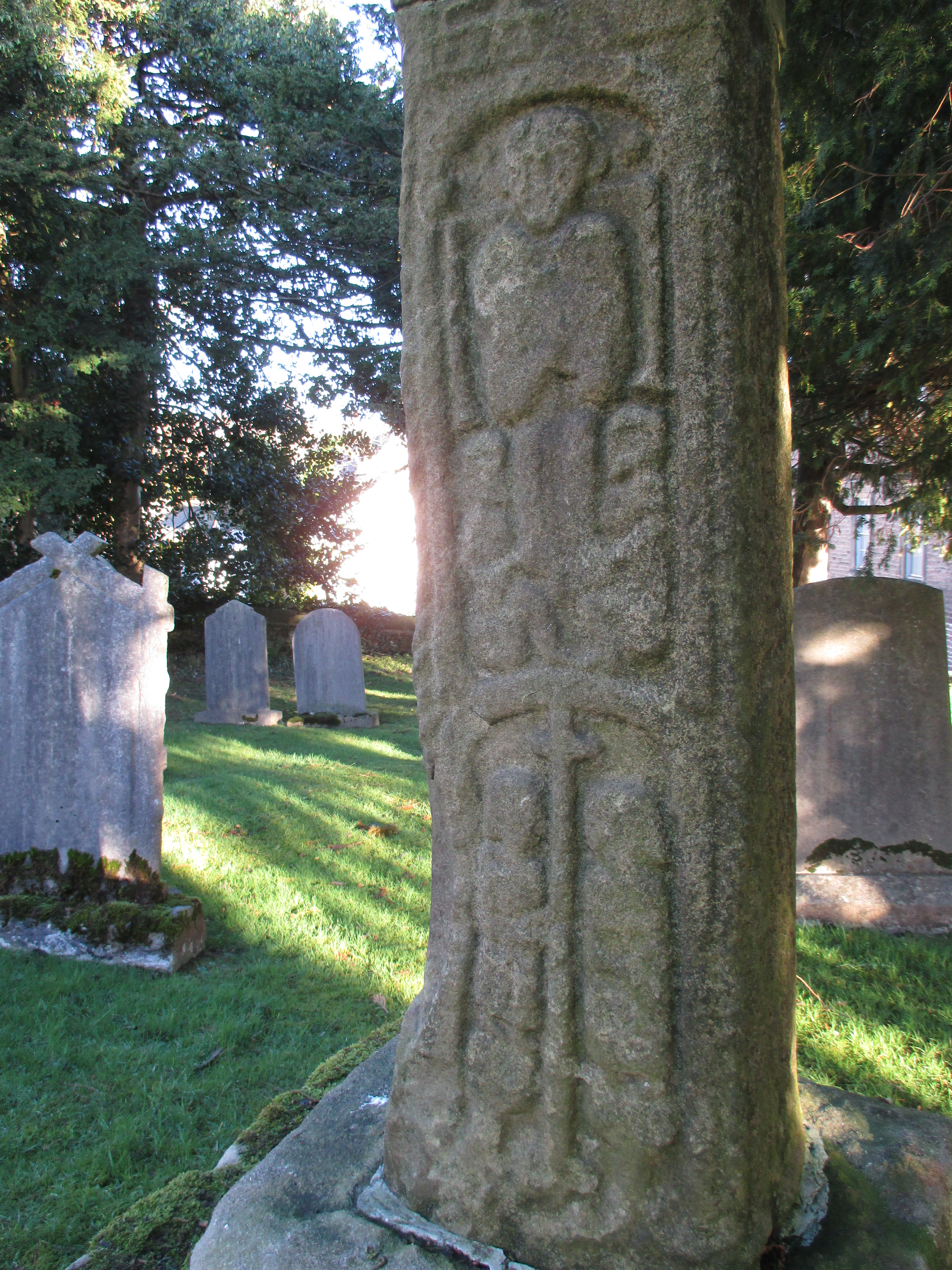
The third face of the original 10th- or 11th-century cross

The lower section of the cross shaft – the only remnant of the original cross – is carved on all four faces. One face has carvings representing scenes from the Völsung cycle of legends featuring the Germanic hero Sigurd. In the lower one the smith Regin is seen forging a sword; above this floats an interlaced knot representing the dragon Fafnir, and beside it appears the decapitated body of Regin. In the upper panel Sigurd roasts Fafnir's heart over a fire while sucking his burnt finger and thumb; above is a tree with birds sitting in its branches. The second face shows Sigurd's horse, Grani, and Fafnir, who is pictured as two intertwined dragons. The third face has a seated figure, perhaps an angel, holding a book; below this is a cross with one man on each side. The fourth face is covered with purely decorative knot and scroll work. The decorative work on all faces is strongly reminiscent of the style found on earlier sculptures at the same church. As a whole this remnant of the original cross, dating from the 10th or 11th century, can be seen as testimony to the ambiguous nature of religious belief in England at that time, Germanic paganism not having been entirely displaced by Christianity, or alternatively as a Christian monument which also represented a well-known legend from the Northern past, chosen simply as a story rather than for its pagan religious significance.

Of the earlier fragments, those slightly further up the cross shaft, of an earlier date, mainly show abstract decorative work, though there is also a haloed full-face head and shoulders under an arch; That at the top of the shaft has emblems of the four Evangelists. The upper arm of cross head features knotwork on three faces and a St Andrew's cross on the fourth.

== Other Halton crosses ==
Inside St Wilfrid's Church several further fragments of 10th-century Anglian crosses are displayed. These also bear carvings representing, among other things, an archer shooting at birds, a flock of sheep, saints, and scrollwork. Together with the fragments preserved in the high cross outside, they testify to the local importance of Halton in the early medieval Northumbrian church.
