= A507 road =

Road in England

A507

Route information
- Length: 30 mi (48 km)

Major junctions
- West end: M1 motorway Junction 13 near Ridgmont; 52.0259°N 0.6037°W
- M1; A421: A5120; A6; A600; A6001; A1; A1(M); A10
- East end: Buntingford; 51.9466°N 0.0298°W

Location
- Country: United Kingdom
- Constituent country: England
- Primary destinations: Milton Keynes, Ampthill, Flitwick, Shefford, Baldock, Buntingford

Road network
- Roads in the United Kingdom; Motorways; A and B road zones
| ← A506 | → A508 |

The A507 is an A-class road in England, linking the M1 motorway near Milton Keynes to the A10 at Buntingford.

== Route ==
Beginning at junction 13 of the M1, the road heads east past Ridgmont to Ampthill. Here it passes between Ampthill and its close neighbour Flitwick, essentially separating the two. After this it passes Flitton before crossing the A6 at a roundabout. Passing Shefford the road briefly multiplexes with the A600 before crossing the A6001 and bypassing Stotfold. Crossing the A1 at junction 10 of the A1(M), where the motorway becomes a normal A-road, the A507 then heads south east through Baldock. After bridging over the A505 (here being the recently opened Baldock north-south bypass) it terminates at a roundabout with the A10 at Buntingford.

== Ridgmont Bypass ==
In 2008, a bypass opened alongside the M1 at Ridgmont. Prior to this the A507 formerly passed through Husborne Crawley and Ridgmont, where it met the A4012 road. The bypass includes three roundabouts and a bridge over the Marston Vale Line.
