= St Saviour's Church, Aughton =

Coordinates: 54.1025°N 2.6892°W

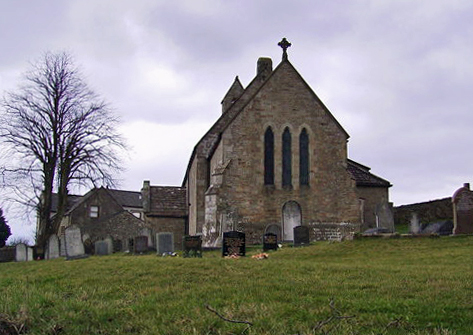
- St Saviour's Church, Aughton, from the east

- Location in the City of Lancaster district
- OS grid reference: SD 55030 67619
- Location: Aughton, Lancashire
- Country: England
- Denomination: Anglican
- Website: St Saviour, Aughton

History
- Status: Parish church

Architecture
- Functional status: Active
- Architect: E. G. Paley
- Architectural type: Church
- Style: Gothic Revival
- Completed: 1864

Administration
- Province: York
- Diocese: Blackburn
- Archdeaconry: Lancaster
- Deanery: Tunstall
- Parish: Halton

Clergy
- Rector: Rev Susan Seed
- Priest: Helen Leathard

St Saviour's Church is an Anglican parish church to the north of the hamlet of Aughton, Lancashire, England.

== Ecclesiastical organisation ==
The church is within the deanery of Tunstall, the archdeaconry of Lancaster and the diocese of Blackburn. Its benefice is united with those of St Wilfrid, Halton and St Luke, Slyne-with-Hest.

== History ==
The church was built in 1864 and designed by the Lancaster architect E. G. Paley. It cost £590 (equivalent of £60,000 in 2025), and provided seating for 100 people. In 1913–14 the successors in the Lancaster practice, Austin and Paley added a parclose screen.

== Architecture ==
It is a small church with lancet windows, including a triple lancet at the east end. It has a bellcote at the west end, and a south porch.

== See also ==
- List of ecclesiastical works by E. G. Paley
- List of ecclesiastical works by Austin and Paley (1895–1914)
