= Listed buildings in Halton-with-Aughton =

Halton-with-Aughton is a civil parish in Lancaster, Lancashire, England. It contains 46 listed buildings that are recorded in the National Heritage List for England. Of these, one is listed at Grade I, the highest of the three grades, three are at Grade II*, the middle grade, and the others are at Grade II, the lowest grade.

The parish is in the Lune Valley to the east of Lancaster, and contains the village of Halton-on-Lune and the settlement of Aughton. Much of the parish is rural. Most of the listed buildings are houses and associated structures, and farmhouses and farm buildings. The Midland Railway, its lines now disused, passed through the parish, and two of its bridges are listed. Passing through the western extremity of the parish is the Lancaster Canal, and an aqueduct and a bridge associated with this are listed. The other listed buildings include a church and associated structures, a mausoleum, a public house, and a bridge over the River Lune.

== Key ==
Grade	Criteria
I	Buildings of exceptional interest, sometimes considered to be internationally important
II*	Particularly important buildings of more than special interest
II	Buildings of national importance and special interest

== Buildings ==
Name and location	Photograph	Date	Notes	Grade
St Wilfrid's Church; 54.07595°N 2.76722°W		1597	The oldest part of the church is the tower, the remainder being rebuilt in 1876–77 by Paley and Austin. It is in sandstone with a red tiled roof, and consists of a nave, a north aisle, a chancel, and a west tower. On the south side is a two-storey porch with applied timber-framing. The tower has three stages, angle buttresses, and a battlemented parapet with pinnacles. Inside the church are fragments of Anglo-Saxon sculpture.	II
Halton Green East Farmhouse; 54.08201°N 2.74114°W		Early 17th century	The farmhouse was extended by the addition of a wing later in the 17th century, giving it a T-shaped plan. The house is in sandstone with a slate roof, and has two storeys with attics and cellars. The windows are mullioned, the mullions in the original part being in wood and in the later part in stone. The doorway and cellar window have architraves. Inside the house is a timber-framed wall with an ogee doorhead, and a bressumer. There is a fragment of a Saxon cross incorporated into the inner wall of the porch.	II*
Middle Highfield, (South-Western Farmhouse); 54.09649°N 2.70876°W	—	1628	A rendered stone house with sandstone dressings and a slate roof. It has two storeys and on the front is a two-storey gabled porch with a finial. The windows are mullioned or mullioned and transomed, and most of the windows on the front have moulded architraves and segmental heads.	II
Sundial; 54.07586°N 2.76736°W	—	1635	The sundial is in the churchyard of St Wilfrid's Church, and was moved to its present position in 1891. It has a sandstone base of three shaped pieces, an inscribed brass plate, and a broken gnomon.	II
2 Rectory Cottages; 54.07714°N 2.76441°W	—	17th century	A stone house with a slate roof, it was originally cruck-built with a single storey. The house has been raised to two storeys, and the mullions have been removed from the windows. The upper floor windows and the doorway are modern.	II
Aughton House and barns 54.09907°N 2.68883°W		17th century (probable)	The house has a barn to the left, and another lower barn to the right that has been incorporated into the house. They are in sandstone with slate roofs. The house has two storeys and an attic. Most of the windows are mullioned, and there are some modern casement windows. On the front is a gabled porch. The barn to the left has two large segmental-arched openings, one of which ash been blocked to form a doorway.	II
Halton Park; 54.08686°N 2.72439°W		17th century	The original county house was largely rebuilt and extended in about 1870 in a similar style. It has two storeys and a front of five bays, with a later cross-wing on the right. The windows are mullioned or transomed.	II
Town End Farmhouse; 54.07713°N 2.76033°W		1672	The farmhouse is in sandstone with a stone-slate roof, and has two storeys with an attic and a cellar. At the rear is a later wing. The windows are mullioned. In the north gable end is a doorway with moulded jambs, and a shaped lintel inscribed with the date and initials.	II
1 Rectory Cottages; 54.07706°N 2.76441°W	—	Late 17th century	A stone house with a slate roof in two storeys. There is a three-light chamfered mullioned window in each floor, and a doorway with a plain surround to the left.	II
Aughton Old Hall; 54.09916°N 2.68928°W		Late 17th century	A sandstone house with a slate roof, it is in two storeys and has a five-bay front. In the centre is a later gabled porch. Some of the windows are mullioned, some have lost their mullions, and others are modern replacements.	II
Halton Green West Farmhouse; 54.08164°N 2.74163°W	—	Late 17th century	The house is in sandstone with a stone-slate roof. It has a T-shaped plan, two storeys with attics, and a symmetrical five-bay front. The doorway has moulded jambs and an ornate lintel. All the windows on the front are cross windows. There is a continuous hood mould above the openings on both floors. In the rear wing are some mullioned windows.	II*
Hawkshead Farmhouse and barn 54.08738°N 2.72414°W	—	Late 17th century	The sandstone farmhouse with a stone-slate roof was extended to the west in the 18th century. It has two storeys and contains mullioned windows. To the right is an outshut with a doorway, above which is a re-set shaped lintel with initials and a date. Further to the right is a barn.	II
Millers Farmhouse; 54.07854°N 2.76113°W		Late 17th century	A pebbledashed stone house with a slate roof, in two storeys. In the centre is a modern gabled porch. The windows are mullioned, with some mullions removed. Inside the house is a bressumer.	II
Farm building, Town End Farm; 54.07720°N 2.76006°W	—	Late 17th century	This possibly originated as a granary and stables. It is in sandstone and has two storeys. There are three doorways and two windows in the south front; the north front is blank. On the west gable end is a flight of external steps leading to a first floor doorway.	II
Ghyll Bank Farmhouse; 54.09769°N 2.69173°W	—	1677	The farmhouse was extended in the early 20th century. It is in sandstone with a slate roof, and has two storeys with an attic and a cellar. Above the chamfered doorway is a decorated and dated lintel. The cellar window is mullioned, but the other windows have either lost their mullions, or are modern.	II
Field Cottage; 54.07882°N 2.76072°W	—	1679	A farmhouse in sandstone with a slate roof, it has two storeys and three bays. The central doorway is flanked by tall windows of a later date. The upper floor windows have lost their mullions.	II
Far Highfield, (Northern House); 54.09889°N 2.69921°W	—	1687	A sandstone farmhouse with a modern tiled roof, in two storeys with an attic. The windows are mullioned, but some mullions have been lost. Above the doorway is a battlemented lintel inscribed with initials and the date.	II
Manor House; 54.07738°N 2.76071°W		1695	The house was extended in 1894, and again later. It is in sandstone with a stone-slate roof. The original part has a T-shaped plan, with a main block and a rear wing. There are two storeys with attics and a five-bay front. Above the central doorway is a battlemented lintel inscribed with initials and the date, and to the left of the doorway is a canted bay window. The windows are mullioned. A battlemented and dated lintel has been re-set in the later extension.	II*
Lime Tree House; 54.07919°N 2.75915°W		Early 18th century	The house is in pebbledashed stone with a slate roof. It has two storeys with an attic, and a three-bay front. The ground floor windows are mullioned, and the upper windows are later casements. The doorway has a moulded surround and a segmental arched head.	II
Gate piers, Manor House; 54.07731°N 2.76101°W	—	Early 18th century	The gate piers have shafts of chamfered rustication. Each is surmounted by a moulded cornice and a ball finial.	II
Aughton Barns; 54.09577°N 2.68758°W	—	18th century (probable)	A sandstone house with a slate roof in two storeys with two bays. Some of the windows are fixed; on the front there are also mullioned windows, and at the rear are sashes. There are two recesses that may have been bee boles.	II
The Beeches; 54.09951°N 2.68960°W	—	18th century	The house has incorporated some 17th-century material. It is in sandstone with a slate roof, and consists of a main block and a wing to the west. There are two storeys, and the windows are mullioned. In the angle between the main block and the wing is a lintel with a date and initials, and the right hand moulded jamb of a previous doorway.	II
Halton Park Farmhouse; 54.08637°N 2.72490°W	—	Mid 18th century	The farmhouse was extended later in the 18th century. It is in two parts, in sandstone with a slate roof, and has two storeys. The windows are mullioned. The surround of one doorway is moulded, and the other is chamfered.	II
Newbanks Cottage; 54.09939°N 2.68871°W	—	Mid 18th century	A stone house with a pebbledashed front and a slate roof that was extended to the right in the late 19th century. It has two storeys and four bays. The windows are mullioned, and the gabled porch has carved bargeboards.	II
Bradshaw Mausoleum; 54.07611°N 2.76711°W		c. 1775	The mausoleum is in the churchyard of St Wilfrid's Church. It has a sandstone three-bay front and a slate roof, and is built into a hillside. The lower part of the front is rusticated, and contains a central blocked doorway flanked by round-headed niches containing urns. In the upper part are panels carved with swags, and a pedimented gable.	II
Clock House and walls 54.07555°N 2.76677°W		Late 18th century	Originating as the coach house to Halton Hall, it has been converted for domestic use. The house is in sandstone with a slate roof, in two storeys and with three bays. Flanking the central block are lower wings and tall concave walls. In the ground floor are three blocked arches with raised keystones and an impost band. Two of the arches contain windows, and the larger central arch contains a doorway. All the windows are 20th-century casements.	II
Archway, Former Halton Hall; 54.07564°N 2.76728°W	—	Late 18th century	The archway is in sandstone and is flanked by chamfered rustication. The lintel is treated as a false flat arch, with chamfered voussoirs and a keystone. Above the arch is a re-set corbel carved with a face.	II
Gate piers, Former Halton Hall; 54.07578°N 2.76786°W	—	Late 18th century	The gate piers are square, in sandstone, with alternately rusticated pillars. At the top of each is a moulded cornice and cap, surmounted by a ball finial.	II
Barn, Pedlars Farm; 54.07921°N 2.76015°W	—	Late 18th century	The barn is in sandstone and cobbles with a slate roof. There is a wide entrance with a segmental head in the west wall, and a threshing door opposite. To the south is a wider shippon with three doors.	II
South-Western Farmhouse; 54.09215°N 2.71721°W	—	Late 18th century (probable)	A sandstone house with a slate roof, in two storeys with a cellar. To the right of the doorway is a re-used 17th-century mullioned window. The cellar has two segmental-headed doorways. The other windows are also mullioned.	II
Tower House, stables and barn 54.07577°N 2.76642°W		Late 18th century	The buildings are in sandstone with slate roofs. The house has three storeys, three bays, and a battlemented parapet. The windows are sashes, the outer ones in the middle floor having moulded cornices, and the central window has a moulded pediment. To the rear the house extends with two bays in two storeys, followed by the former stables. At the south is a smaller three-storey battlemented tower.	II
Gate piers, St Wilfrid's Church; 54.07611°N 2.76652°W	—	Late 18th century	The gate piers are at an entrance to the churchyard. They are in sandstone and have a square plan. There are round-headed niches on two sides of each pier, and at the top is a fluted frieze, a moulded cornice, and a pyramidal cap. The gates are in wrought iron.	II
White Lion Hotel and coach house 54.07604°N 2.76621°W		Late 18th century	A stone public house, pebbledashed at the front, with a slate roof. It has 2 1/2 storeys and a three-bay front. The doorway and windows have plain surrounds, the windows being sashes. To the right is the former coach house that has a small window, a stable door, and a cart entrance with a segmental head.	II
Gate piers, St Wilfrid's Church; 54.07611°N 2.76652°W	—	1792 (probable)	The gate piers are at the main entrance to the churchyard. They are in sandstone and have a square plan with alternative rustication. Each pier has a cornice and a pyramidal cap.	II
Lune Aqueduct; 54.06845°N 2.78934°W		1794–97	The aqueduct carries the Lancaster Canal over the River Lune. It was designed by John Rennie and is built in sandstone. It consists of five semicircular stone arches with a stone trough carried on piers with cutwaters. The piers rest on piles of Russian timber. The parapets are balustraded above each arch.	I
Halton Road Bridge (No. 108); 54.06932°N 2.79127°W		1797	The bridge carries Halton Road over the Lancaster Canal. It is in gritstone and consists of a single arch with alternate blocked voussoirs. The bridge has a solid parapet and a rounded coping.	II
Green Beck House; 54.08063°N 2.74299°W	—	Early 19th century	The house is in sandstone with a slate roof, in two storeys and with three bays. The doorways and windows have plain surrounds, and the windows are either sashes or fixed. At the rear is a tall stair window, and an external flight of stairs leading to a first floor doorway.	II
Moorgate Farmhouse; 54.08861°N 2.74088°W	—	Early 19th century	A sandstone house with a slate roof, in two storeys with a cellar and a symmetrical three-bay front. The windows have plain surrounds. Five steps lead up to the doorway that has a shouldered architrave, fluted pilaster strips, moulded brackets, and a triangular pediment.	II
The Boathouse; 54.07522°N 2.76620°W		Early to mid 19th century	This was originally the boathouse for Halton Hall, and was extended in 1939, using material from the hall, for domestic use, while retaining the boathouse on the ground floor. It is in sandstone with a slate roof, and has two storeys. At the entrance to the boathouse is a wide pointed arch, and above it is a canted oriel window. In the gable are shaped bargeboards with a finial and pendants. Elsewhere is a doorway and mullioned windows, all with triangular heads.	II
Barn, Halton Green East Farm; 54.08229°N 2.74088°W		1837	The barn is in sandstone with a slate roof and has two storeys. All fronts are symmetrical, and there are various openings, including ventilation slits. In the upper storey is a threshing door, above which is an inscribed plaque. There are Gothic features, including the copings, and a trefoil-headed owl hole in the apex of each gable.	II
Carus Lodge; 54.07391°N 2.78232°W	—	Late 1830s	A country house in sandstone with a slate roof. It has two storeys and an irregular plan. Some of its windows are mullioned, and others are sashes. Other features include a loggia, half-dormers, bay windows, an oriel window, balustrading, and arrowslits. The former stables have been incorporated into the house.	II
Carus Lodge Cottage; 54.07275°N 2.78406°W		c. 1840	The cottage forms a lodge at the entrance to the drive to the house. It is in sandstone with a hipped slate roof, and has a single storey. Facing the drive is a canted bay window. The timber porch has carved bargeboards and the windows are mullioned.	II
Piers, walls and railings, Carus Lodge Cottage; 54.07264°N 2.78420°W	—	c. 1840	At the entrance to the drive are six piers, and two low convex walls with cast iron railings. The piers and walls are in sandstone. The piers are similar, each with an octagonal shaft decorated with gablets and panels, and with a castellated top.	II
Eastern railway bridge, Crook of Lune; 54.07636°N 2.73189°W		c. 1880	The bridge, crossing the River Lune, and now disused, was built for the Midland Railway. It consists of five segmental iron arches, with piers and abutments in sandstone. In the spandrels of the arches are roundels, and the bridge has an iron lattice-work parapet. Timber beams support the deck.	II
Western railway bridge, Crook of Lune; 54.07655°N 2.73498°W		c. 1880	The bridge was built for the Midland Railway, but is no longer in use. It consists of six segmental iron arches carried on rectangular sandstone piers and with sandstone abutments. The deck is supported by timber beams. In the spandrels of the arches are roundels, and the parapet is an iron lattice.	II
Caton Lune Bridge; 54.07577°N 2.73100°W		1883	The bridge, designed by E. G. Paley replaced an earlier bridge that collapsed in 1881. It carries Low Road over the River Lune. The bridge is in sandstone and consists of three elliptical arches carrying a flat deck. It has rounded cutwaters, projecting voussoirs, and a balustraded parapet.	II
