= Listed buildings in Slyne-with-Hest =

Slyne-with-Hest is a civil parish in Lancaster, Lancashire, England. It contains 34 buildings that are recorded in the National Heritage List for England as designated listed buildings. Of these, one is at Grade II*, the middle grade, and the others are at Grade II, the lowest grade. The parish contains the villages of Slyne and Hest Bank, and most of the listed buildings are houses, or originated as houses, and associated structures. The Lancaster Canal passes through the parish, and eight bridges crossing it are listed. The other listed buildings include a public house, three milestones, a hotel, a church, a pinfold, and a set of stocks.

== Key ==
Grade	Criteria
II*	Particularly important buildings of more than special interest
II	Buildings of national importance and special interest

== Buildings ==
Name and location	Photograph	Date	Notes	Grade
Beaumont Hall; 54.06867°N 2.79802°W		1602	The house was later extended. It is in sandstone with a pebbledashed front and slate roof. It has two storey with attics, and the original part has two bays. The later extension is to the right at the rear. The windows are mullioned. On the front is a single-storey porch with a hippedstone-slate roof.	II
Beaumont Cote and Beaumont Cote Manor; 54.08763°N 2.76906°W	—	17th century	A house, later divided into two houses, most of it dating from the 18th century. It is in rendered stone with sandstone dressings and a slate roof. The house has an L-shaped plan, three storeys, a five-bay front, and a rear wing, this being the older part. Most of the windows are sashes, and in the wing some are mullioned and transomed. The main doorway has a fanlight, and an open pediment on consoles. In the wing is a doorway with a moulded architrave, a pulvinated frieze, and a cornice.	II
Sundial base 54.08755°N 2.76968°W	—	Late 17th century	The former sundial is in the garden of Beaumont Cote. It is in sandstone, and consists of a square pillar joined in two parts. The lower part has a roundel inscribed with "TC 1680"; the upper part is chamfered and has the raised letters "TC" in a panel. On the top is an octagonal panel.	II
Little Grange; 54.08483°N 2.80059°W	—	1675	A stone house with sandstone dressings and a modern tile roof, it has two storeys and two bays. The windows are mullioned, and above the doorway is a re-set dated and battlemented lintel. At the rear is a blocked staircase window with two transoms.	II
Manor House; 54.08731°N 2.80003°W		1681	A house in cobbles with sandstone dressings and a slate roof. It is in a T-shaped plan, with 2 1/2 storeys, and a symmetrical five-bay front. The lower floors contain cross windows, and in the attic they are mullioned. The central doorway has a moulded surround and a shaped lintel. Above the doorway is an inscribed plaque.	II*
Ashton House; 54.08574°N 2.80030°W		1723	A stone farmhouse with a slate roof, in two storeys and two bays. The windows are mullioned, and there is a blocked fire window. The doorway has a moulded surround and a lintel inscribed with initials and the date.	II
136 Slyne Road; 54.08772°N 2.79965°W		Early 18th century	A cobble house with sandstone dressings and a slate roof, it has two storeys with an attic and two bays. The windows are mullioned, and there is a blocked fire window. Above the doorway is an ogee-shaped lintel, and between the upper floor windows is a dated plaque. At the rear is a staircase wing.	II
Cross Keys and barn 54.08415°N 2.80094°W		1727	A public house in rendered stone with a slate roof in two storeys. There are two blocks, the later block is dated 1830. Most of the windows are mullioned, and others are sashes. The doorway in the older block has a chamfered surround and a lintel inscribed with initials and the date. On the front of the newer block is a dated plaque. Behind the older block is a stone barn, not rendered, that has a wide opening with a segmental arch.	II
Gate piers, Manor House; 54.08727°N 2.79983°W		18th century	The gate piers are in sandstone, and have a square plan. On the top of each is a moulded cornice and a ball finial.	II
Whitewalls Restaurant; 54.09267°N 2.80815°W		1751	A house that was extended in 1829 and later used as a restaurant. It is in rendered stone with sandstone dressings and a modern tile roof. It has two storeys, and the windows are sashes. The doorway in the older part has a moulded architrave, a moulded cornice, and a false keystone carved with the date and grotesque face. In the later part is a French window, and a doorway with a shaped lintel and a moulded cornice inscribed with initials and the date.	II
Gate piers, Whitewalls Restaurant; 54.09251°N 2.80801°W	—	18th century	The gate piers are in chamfered rusticated sandstone. They have moulded cornices, and on the right pier is an acorn finial.	II
Ancliffe Hall; 54.08699°N 2.78681°W	—	Late 18th century	A stone farmhouse with a slate roof, in two storeys and three bays. The windows and doors have plain surrounds, and the entrance is in the centre.	II
Gate piers, Beaumont Cote; 54.08786°N 2.76934°W	—	Late 18th century (probable)	The gate piers are in chamfered ashlar sandstone. They have a square plan, moulded cornices and ball finials.	II
Slyne Hall; 54.08936°N 2.79683°W		Late 18th century	A sandstone house with a slate roof, in three storeys and with a symmetrical three-bay front. The openings have plain surrounds. The windows in the ground and top floor are sashes, and in the middle floor they are modern.	II
Slyne Grange; 54.08470°N 2.80061°W	—	Late 18th century	A house in stone, pebbledashed at the front, and with a slate roof. There are two storeys and three bays. The windows are sashes, some of which are separated by mullions.	II
Folly Bridge (no 112); 54.07166°N 2.81183°W		1797	The bridge carries Folly Lane over the Lancaster Canal. It is in gritstone, and consists of a single semi-elliptical arch with a projecting keystone and a solid parapet with rounded coping.	II
Williamslands Bridge (no 113); 54.07455°N 2.81525°W		1797	An accommodation bridge over the Lancaster Canal in gritstone. It consists of a single semi-elliptical arch with a projecting keystone and a solid parapet with rounded coping.	II
Belmount Bridge (no 114); 54.07589°N 2.81532°W		1797	The bridge carries Hasty Brow Road over the Lancaster Canal. It is in gritstone, and consists of a single semi-elliptical arch with a projecting keystone and a solid parapet with rounded coping.	II
Blind Lane Bridge (no 115); 54.08017°N 2.81517°W		1797	An accommodation bridge over the Lancaster Canal in gritstone. It consists of a single semi-elliptical arch with a projecting keystone and a solid parapet with rounded coping.	II
Rakes Head Bridge (no 116); 54.08422°N 2.81384°W		1797	The bridge carries Rakes Head Lane over the Lancaster Canal. It is in gritstone, and consists of a single semi-elliptical arch with a projecting keystone and a solid parapet with rounded coping.	II
Occupation Bridge, (no 117); 54.08899°N 2.81354°W		1797	An accommodation bridge over the Lancaster Canal in gritstone. It consists of a single semi-elliptical arch with a projecting keystone and a solid parapet with rounded coping.	II
Canal Bridge, (no 118); 54.09053°N 2.81214°W		1797	The bridge carries Hest Bank Lane over the Lancaster Canal. It is in gritstone, and consists of a single semi-elliptical arch with a projecting keystone and a solid parapet with rounded coping.	II
Hatlex Bridge, (no 119); 54.09242°N 2.80609°W		1797	The bridge carries Hatlex Lane over the Lancaster Canal. It is in gritstone, and consists of a single semi-elliptical arch with a projecting keystone and a solid parapet with rounded coping.	II
Milestone; 54.08754°N 2.79964°W		c. 1800	The milestone is in sandstone with cast iron plates. It has a circular base inscribed with the name of the parish, and above it is triangular. The plates indicate the distances in miles to Lancaster and to Burton.	II
Milestone; 54.08694°N 2.80954°W		c. 1800	The milestone is in sandstone with cast iron plates. It has a circular base inscribed with the name of the parish, and above it is triangular. The plates indicate the distances in miles to Lancaster and to Hest Bank.	II
Milestone; 54.07375°N 2.80153°W	—	c. 1800	The milestone is in sandstone with cast iron plates. It is triangular in section, and its base is buried. The plates indicate the distances in miles to Lancaster and to Burton.	II
1 and 3 Hest Bank Lane; 54.09060°N 2.81184°W	—	1820	A pair of houses, possible converted from a canal warehouse. They are in sandstone with a slate roof and are in two storeys. The openings have plain surrounds. In the south gable is an arched opening with a keystone inscribed with the date.	II
2 and 4 Hanging Gate Lane; 54.08825°N 2.80618°W	—	Early 19th century	A pair of mirrored roughcast cottages with sandstone dressings and hipped slate roofs. They have two storeys, and each cottage has a single-bay front. The windows are sashes.	II
Beaumont Grange; 54.07958°N 2.78699°W	—	Early 19th century	A rendered house with sandstone dressings and a slate roof, and a symmetrical front of three bays. The projecting central bay has 2 1/2 storeys, and the outer bays have two. In the centre is a gabled porch with finials. The porch has diagonal buttresss, corner pinnacles, a battlemented parapet, and a four-centred doorway with a hood mould. The windows are mullioned, or mullioned and transomed. At the rear is a wing with sash windows.	II
Boundary stone 54.09023°N 2.79783°W		Early 19th century (probable)	The stone marks the boundary with Bolton-le-Sands. It is in sandstone, and consists of a block with a triangular plan. Inscribed on the left face is "SLYNE", and on the other face is "BOLTON".	II
Slyne Lodge Hotel; 54.08561°N 2.80075°W		c. 1830	A sandstone hotel with a slate roof, in two portions. The southern portion has two storeys, three bays, and a rear wing. The northern portion has two storeys with an attic and two bays. In its centre is a porch with pilasters and a cornice, and the door has a semicircular head. In the roof are two modern dormers. All the windows are sashes with architraves; those in the ground floor of the southern portion also have pulvinated friezes and triangular pediments.	II
St Luke's Church; 54.08777°N 2.80561°W		1898–1900	The church, by Austin and Paley in Gothic Revival style, is in sandstone with a red tile roof. It consists of a nave, a north aisle, a chancel, and a tower between the nave and the chancel. On top of the tower is a wooden bellcote, and it has a hipped roof.	II
Pinfold; 54.08390°N 2.80119°W		Uncertain	The pinfold is roughly semicircular in plan, and is built in cobble with a triangular sandstone capping.	II
Stocks and stone seat 54.08394°N 2.80119°W		Uncertain	The stocks consist of two square sandstone pillars with slots in the internal faces. In the slots is a wooden leg piece with six holes and there is an iron locking bar. Behind is a long stone seat.	II
