= A600 road =

Road in England

Coordinates: 51.8731°N 0.1513°W

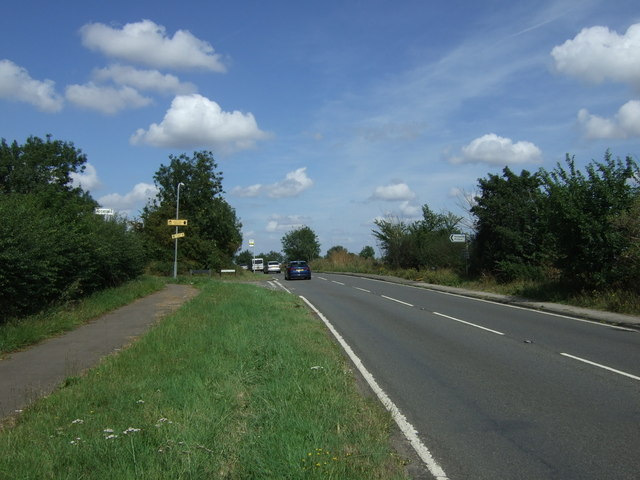
Bedford Road (A600) between Hitchin and Shefford

The A600 is a road linking Hitchin in Hertfordshire, England to Bedford, Bedfordshire. It runs for 18 miles and goes via Henlow Camp with a bypass around Shefford.

In the 1960s, 'The Viatores' proposed that the route was one of a dense network of Roman roads in the southeast Midlands and ran from St Albans to Bedford. However, this has been discounted given there is no trace of an agger and it mostly does not run in straight lengths. Nonetheless, its use as a parish boundary, for example between Ickleford and Shillington, suggests that it is premodern and it may date to the 10th century to connect the newly built burhs in Bedford and Hitchin.

The road was still described as an "arterial roads" forming part of the recommended route from London to Leicester, Derby and Manchester, via Bedford in 1926.

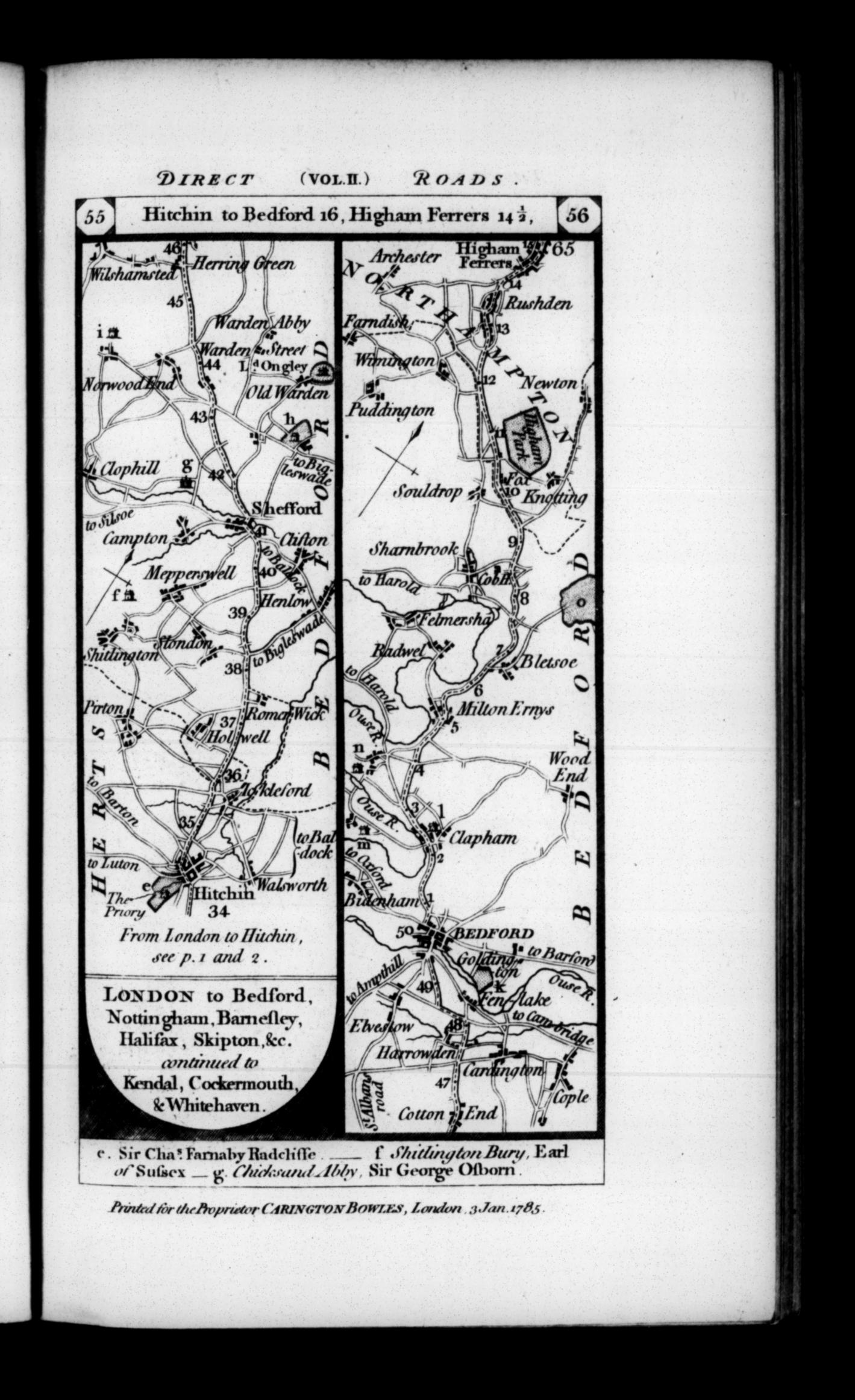
1785 map showing road from Hitchin to Bedford

The Shefford by-pass was built in the late 1980s and is partly designated the A600 and partly the A507.
