= Skerton Community High School =

Location
- Owen Road; Lancaster, Lancashire, LA1 2BL; England; 54.05765°N 2.7988°W

Information
- Type: Community School
- Established: 1934
- Closed: 2014
- Local authority: Lancashire
- Department for Education URN: 119710 Tables
- Ofsted: Reports
- Gender: Coeducational
- Age: 11 to 16

Skerton Community High School was a secondary school in Skerton, Lancaster, England.

== Foundation ==
Skerton Community High School was built by the Corporation of Lancaster in the early years of the 1930s, the foundation stone being laid on 21 September 1932 and the building itself completed by 1934, the year that the school opened. Originally, it was a provider of education to both boys and girls, who were segregated; the boys being educated in the northern wing, while the girls were educated in the Southern wing. The latter presided over by a headmistress and the former, by a headmaster.

== Architecture ==
The school was built in an E-shape, the majority of the classrooms being on the one corridor. The style is Art Deco, with clean-cut lines and architectural relief being provided through the geometric shapes.

The original facade of the building still exists, though with some notable exceptions; it appears that alterations were later made to the original architectural design, (the assembly hall, for example, was originally planned as being in the central position, but it was later decided to build the hall towards the rear). A hand-drawn set of plans, beautifully finished with watercolours, can be seen in the main entrance, just by reception.

What is now the main corridor was once an open verandah, with doors lining the inner walls of the classroom which could be opened out onto the verandah to release pupils from their lessons and let in fresh air during hot weather. The verandah has since disappeared, to be replaced by a closed corridor which runs the length of the building.

There were originally two quadrangles, the northern one being for the boys and the southern one for the girls. These have been encroached upon in subsequent years; the northern quadrangle being halved in size by the construction of a new sports hall in the early 1990s. The southern quadrangle has remained more or less intact.

== Place in modern Lancaster ==
In 2003 the school was placed in 'special measures' having failed an OFSTED inspection.

In 2007, Skerton was named as the highest-achieving, non-selective state school in Lancaster.

In June 2007, it was revealed that the school was to be closed, as part of a state modernisation programme. The proposal was to create an Academy out of three existing schools; Central Lancaster High School, Skerton Community High and Hornby. The proposal collapsed and it was decided to keep Skerton High open.

However, in July 2013 Lancashire County Council announced it was consulting on the possible closure of the school due to low pupil numbers and an inadequate Ofsted inspection. The school formally closed in August 2014.
