= St Wilfrid's Church, Halton-on-Lune =

Coordinates: 54.0760°N 2.7672°W

St Wilfrid's, Halton
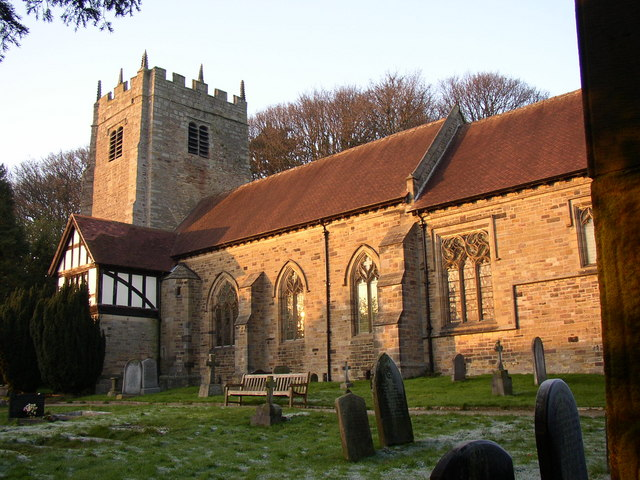

- Location in the City of Lancaster district
- OS grid reference: SD 49896 64722
- Location: Halton, Lancashire
- Country: England
- Denomination: Anglican

History
- Status: Parish church

Architecture
- Functional status: Active
- Heritage designation: Grade II
- Designated: 4 October 1967
- Architect: Paley and Austin
- Completed: 1877

Administration
- Province: York
- Diocese: Blackburn
- Archdeaconry: Lancaster
- Deanery: Tunstall

St Wilfrid's Church is an Anglican church in Halton-on-Lune, a village in the English county of Lancashire. It is an active parish church in the Diocese of Blackburn and the archdeaconry of Lancaster. Halton may have been the site of an ancient Anglo-Saxon minster. Of the current structure, the tower dates from the 16th century and the remainder was built 1876–77 by Paley and Austin. The church is recorded in the National Heritage List for England as a designated Grade II listed building.

== History ==
Before the Norman conquest of England in 1066, Halton was the centre of a large manor that belonged to Earl Tostig Godwinson. There is evidence of a Christian site at Halton and there was probably an Anglo-Saxon minster there. There may have been a connection to Bishop Wilfrid (c. 633 – c. 709) and certainly by 1252, there was a church dedicated to St Wilfrid. Until the early 18th century, the advowson (the right to appoint a parish priest) belonged to the lord of the manor.

A tower was built in the 16th century. The church (excluding the tower) was rebuilt in 1792. The current structure was built 1876–77 by Lancaster-based architecture firm Paley and Austin. The 16th-century tower remains. The churchyard was enlarged in 1872, 1901 and again in 1907.

== Architecture ==
=== Exterior ===
St Wilfrid's is constructed of yellow sandstone rubble and has red tile roofs. Its plan consists of a nave, with a tower to the west, north aisle and chancel to the east. There is a two-storey porch on the south side of the nave, with timber framing to the upper storey. The three-stage tower is 55 feet (17 m) tall. The west corners have five-stage diagonal buttresses. It has a crenellated parapet with pinnacles. At the north-east corner there is a vice (spiral stair). There are two-light belfry louvres with hood moulding.

The windows in the south walls are in the Decorated style. There is varying tracery.

=== Interior and fittings ===
Internally, the tower measures 12 feet 10 inches (3.91 m) square. It has a ring of three bells. Inside the tower there are some remains of Anglo Saxon sculpture. The nave measures 49 feet 9 inches (15.16 m) by 18 feet 9 inches (5.72 m). It is accessed from the tower through a segmental arch with a single chamfered order. The nave has four bays. The chancel measures 25 feet (7.6 m) by 18 feet (5.5 m). It contains an organ chamber and a vestry.

Stained glass in the church includes images of Joan of Arc and Saint George by Lancaster-based firm Shrigley and Hunt. There is a baptismal font dating from 1848.

== Churchyard ==
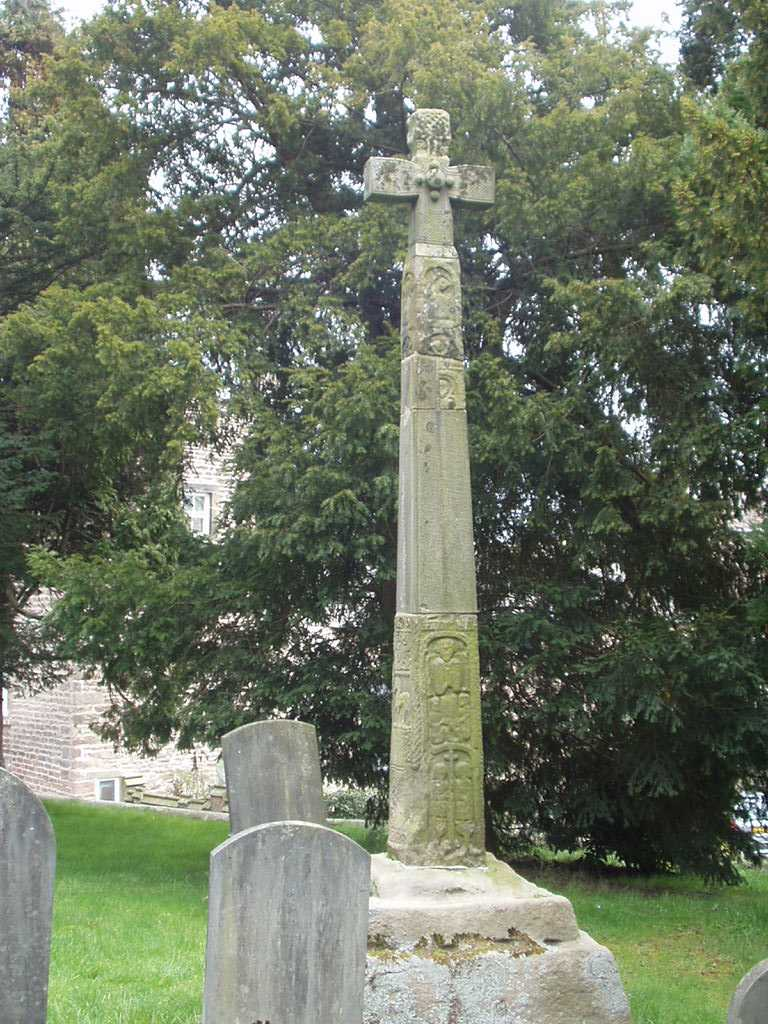
Anglo Saxon high cross

The churchyard surrounds the church, particularly to the south and east. There are sandstone gates and gate piers that date from the late 18th century. A lychgate dates from 1907. To the north, there is a two-tiered burial vault built into a hill, with the remains of the Bradshaw family.

South of the church lies an Anglo Saxon high cross. The cross is carved sandstone and consists of a base, measuring 1.5 metres (4 ft 11 in) by 1.4 metres (4 ft 7 in), with a shaft and cross head. 11th-century carvings on the shaft depict the legend of Sigurd.

Approximately 4 metres (13 ft) south-east of the porch there is a 17th-century sundial. The base is sandstone and is inscribed with "For Saint Wilfrite Church at Halton 1635. Pereunt et imputantur".

== Assessment and administration ==
St Wilfrid's was designated as a Grade II listed building on 4 October 1967. The Grade II designation is the lowest of the three grades. Architectural historians Pevsner and Hartwell (2009) say that the church is "easily recognizable" as the work of Paley and Austin. The 18th-century gates and piers and the sundial have received separate Grade II designations. The high cross has been designated a scheduled monument as a "good example of 11th century art styles".

St Wilfrid's is an active parish church in the Anglican Diocese of Blackburn, which is part of the Province of York. It is in the archdeaconry of Lancaster and the Deanery of Tunstall. St Wilfrid's shares a benefice with St Saviour's Church in Aughton and St Luke's Church in Slyne-with-Hest.

== See also ==
- Listed buildings in Halton-with-Aughton
- List of ecclesiastical works by Paley and Austin
- Scheduled monuments in Lancashire
