= Slyne-with-Hest =

Civil parish in Lancashire, England

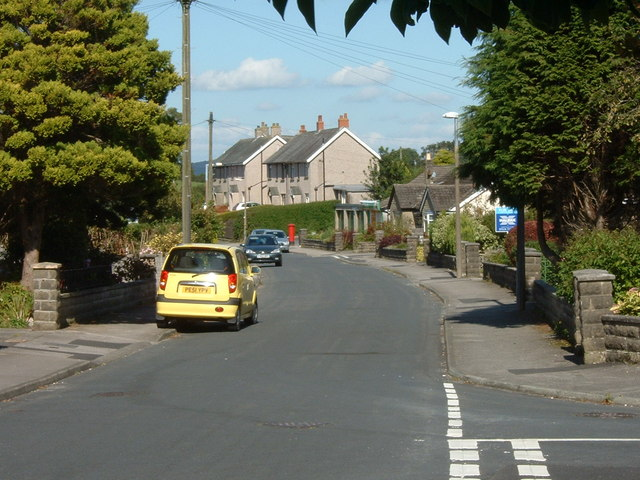
- Manor Road

- Location in the City of Lancaster district Location within Lancashire
- Population: 3,126 (2011)
- OS grid reference: SD473660
- Civil parish: Slyne-with-Hest
- District: Lancaster
- Shire county: Lancashire
- Region: North West
- Country: England
- Sovereign state: United Kingdom
- Post town: LANCASTER
- Postcode district: LA2
- Dialling code: 01524
- Police: Lancashire
- Fire: Lancashire
- Ambulance: North West
- UK Parliament: Morecambe and Lunesdale

Slyne-with-Hest is a civil parish in the City of Lancaster in Lancashire, England. It had a population of 3,163 recorded in the 2001 census, decreasing to 3,126 at the 2011 Census. The parish is north of Lancaster and consists of two villages; Slyne, on the A6 road, and Hest Bank on the coast.

== History ==
Hest Bank (54°05′N 2°48′W ) is a village in north-western Lancashire, England, the boundaries of which include the coastline, from a western shoreline of salt-flats that adjoin the northern extremities of Morecambe's Victorian era Promenade, to a less clearly defined boundary in the east with the village of Slyne, which dates from Anglo-Saxon times.

== Notable buildings and roads ==
Hest Bank's best-known building, 'The Hest Bank Hotel' (previously named the Sands Inn), is itself hundreds of years old, and once served as a coaching station for traffic crossing the sands of what is now called Morecambe Bay. Ordnance Survey Maps still show the right-of-way across Morecambe Bay from Hest Bank to Grange-over-Sands, and many walkers enjoy guided walks across the bay, which take place from Spring to Autumn, normally every other weekend, tides allowing. The right-of-way is not suitable for normal motor vehicles, there being water at around knee-height to cross at the outflow from the River Kent.

== Governance ==
An electoral ward of the same name exists. This ward extends beyond the confines of the parish and has a population taken at the 2011 Census of 4,119.

Before Brexit for the European Parliament residents in Slyne-with-Hest voted to elect MEPs for the North West England constituency.

== Transport ==
=== Bus ===
The village has 4 bus routes serving. First one is the 755 to Heysham or Bowness-on-Windermere.The second is the 5 to Carnforth or Overton. The third one is the 55 to Lancaster or Carnforth. The final one is the 85 to Lancaster or Carnforth via Morecambe.[10]

== Train ==
The town no longer has a railway station. It closed in 1969 after a fatal steam train derailment. Now, the nearest train station is Lancaster with services to Glasgow, Edinburgh, Barrow, Windermere going Northbound and going southbound, Manchester Airport and London Euston. A branch line also runs to Morecambe and Heysham Port, and a few trains run to Leeds.

=== Railway Incident ===
In 1965 this originally coastal village was the scene of a rail accident on 20 May, when a sleeper train from London Euston bound for Glasgow Central left the rails at 70 mph and collided with the Hest Bank station buildings. No one was seriously injured, although from that time Hest Bank has ceased to serve as a passenger station, its railside platform consequently now lying buried in undergrowth.

== Community ==
The village has a primary school: Slyne-with-Hest St Lukes Church of England Primary School; and has a collection of tennis, football and bowling clubs.

== Notable people ==
- Tyson Fury, boxer
- Dame Thora Hird, actress
- Lisa O'Hare, actress
- Helen Pidd, journalist

== See also ==
- Listed buildings in Slyne-with-Hest
