= Heysham to M6 Link Road =

Road in Lancashire, England

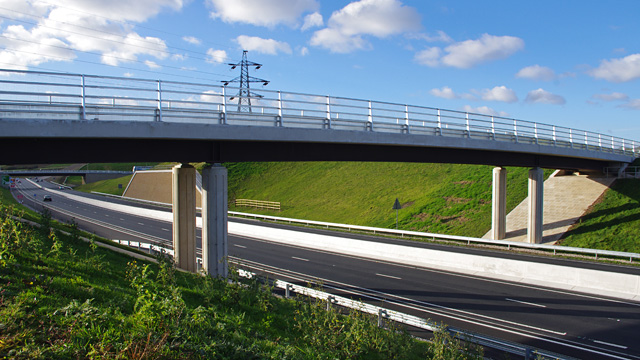
The Beaumont Gate Bridge over the Heysham to M6 Link Road

The Heysham to M6 Link Road, known as the Bay Gateway, is a 3-mile-long (5 km) dual carriageway link road between the Heysham and Morecambe peninsula to Junction 34 of the M6 motorway in Lancashire, England. It was opened on 31 October 2016. In the process, Junction 34 was remodelled.

The concept was published in the document "Road Plan for Lancashire", in 1948. The idea was revived in 1962 in the Lancashire Development Plan. The first phase, known as the Lancaster and Morecambe bypass, opened in 1994, leaving the Lune crossing and the motorway link unbuilt. Planning permission for this was granted in 2008, with the Department for Transport accepting the "best and final bid offer" and confirming a funding contribution of £111m in 2011. The Secretary of State for Transport gave final approval in March 2013. Over 18,000 vehicles per day used the new road, which had a final cost of £123.9 million, in the year since it was opened.

The road forms part of the A683 Heysham–Kirkby Stephen route. The former route of the A683 through Lancaster has been redesignated the A589.

Archaeological work was undertaken in 2014 for the Heysham to M6 Link project, now the Bay Gateway. It was a large-scale civil-engineering project mainly funded by the Department For Transport, which was monitored by the former Lancashire County Archaeological Service. Preliminary work comprised desk-based assessment and walkover surveys, and geophysical surveys to identify hitherto unidentified archaeological remains. Significant high levels of archaeological remains were found. Fieldwork was led by Oxford Archaeology North and excavations led to almost ten years of archaeological investigation.

The earliest activity was radiocarbon dated to the mid-fifth millennium cal BC, towards the end of the Mesolithic period. Five different areas of prehistoric activity occurred on the route, dating from the Neolithic period through to the Bronze Age, represented by a group of pits and post holes, organic material was radiocarbon dated to the mid-fourth millennium BC.

Medieval occupation may have commenced as early as the mid-eleventh century in the valley of the Howgill Brook in the area of Beaumont. On the west side of the brook, evidence of three phases of building were identified. Documentary evidence places the site at the heart of Beaumont Grange, one of many holdings of Furness Abbey across northern England.
