= Listed buildings in Lancaster, Lancashire (central area) =

Lancaster is an unparished area in the City of Lancaster, Lancashire, England. It contains over 330 buildings that are recorded in the National Heritage List for England. Of these, four are listed at Grade I, the highest of the three grades, 24 are at Grade II*, the middle grade, and the others are at Grade II, the lowest grade.

Lancaster has a long history and this is reflected in its listed buildings. The oldest listed structure is a portion of wall from a Roman fort, and Lancaster Castle dates from the middle of the 12th century. The town stands at the lowest crossing of the River Lune, and received its first borough charter in 1193. In addition to being a market town, it became the judicial centre of the county of Lancashire, the castle being converted to serve this purpose in the 18th century. Also in the 18th century, in order to trade with the Americas, St George's Quay, with its warehouses and houses, was developed. Towards the end of that century the Lancaster Canal was built, linking the town with Preston. In the 19th century, railways came to the town, including what is now the West Coast Main Line. During this century some industry, including cotton mills and the manufacture of linoleum, was established but never thrived. There are listed buildings related to all of these aspects of the town's history.

Almost all the listed buildings are constructed in local sandstone, and most have slate roofs. A high proportion of the listed buildings are houses, or originated as houses and were converted for other uses, particularly into shops and offices. An architectural practice was established in the town in 1836 by Edmund Sharpe, and continued in existence for over 100 years with a succession of partners, eventually closing as Austin and Paley in 1944; this practice was responsible for designing many buildings in the town, some of which are listed.

This list includes the listed buildings in the central part of the area, the boundaries of which are the railway on the west side, the Lancaster Canal on the south and east sides, and to the north, a line passing from west to east through the centre of Quay Meadow.

== Key ==
Grade	Criteria
I	Buildings of exceptional interest, sometimes considered to be internationally important
II*	Particularly important buildings of more than special interest
II	Buildings of national importance and special interest

== Buildings ==
Name and location	Photograph	Date	Notes	Grade
Wery Wall; 54.05150°N 2.80347°W		4th century	This is an irregular fragment of masonry from a Roman fort, about 2 metres (6 ft 7 in) high built into the edge of a steep slope.	II
Lancaster Castle; 54.0498°N 2.8055°W		c. 1150	The castle has been used later as a court house and a prison. The oldest part is the keep, parts of Hadrian's Tower date from about 1200, and the gatehouse dates from about 1400. Towards the end of the 18th century alterations and additions were made by Thomas Harrison and completed by J. M. Gandy. These included a Governor's House, a Crown Court, a Grand Jury room, a new Shire hall, and separate prisons for males and females.	I
Lancaster Priory; 54.05071°N 2.80539°W		c. 1430	Also known as St Mary's Church, it contains some earlier fabric, the tower was added in 1754–55 by Henry Sephton, and later alterations include the addition of a south porch and north chapel in about 1903 by Austin and Paley. The church is built in sandstone with roofs of slate and lead. It consists of a nave with a clerestory, aisles, a south porch, a north chapel, a west office and refectory, and a west tower. The tower has four stages with buttresses, corner pinnacles, and an embattled parapet. Inside the church are elaborately carved canopies to the choir stalls, and a set of misericords.	I
Judges' Lodgings; 54.05016°N 2.80372°W		c. 1625	Originally a house, later used as a lodging for judges, and in the 1970s converted into a museum. It is in sandstone, incorporating re-used timbers, it has a slate roof, and is in a U-shaped plan. There are three storeys and a basement, the front having seven bays. The central doorway has a segmental head, Doric columns, a triglyph frieze containing roses, and a carved lion's head above each column. The windows are sashes. In front of the building is a flagged forecourt, steps, gates, gate piers, and railings.	I
Conservative Club; 54.05010°N 2.80245°W		1637	Originally a house, later used as a club, the oldest part is the rear wing, the rest being remodelled in the early 18th century. It is in sandstone with slate roofs, and consists of two ranges parallel to the street. The symmetrical front range has three storeys, a cellar, and five bays. All the windows are sashes with moulded architraves. The doorway, approached up four steps and flanked by railings, has engaged fluted Ionic columns, an entablature with a pulvinated frieze, and a dentilled pediment. The rear range is in four storeys, and contains a two-storey bow window.	II*
17 and 19 Moor Lane; 54.04921°N 2.79719°W		Late 17th century	Originally a house, later used as a shop and office, it is in sandstone with a rendered front and a slate roof. The building has two full storeys and a low third storey. In the ground floor are shop fronts, in the middle floor is a sash window and a casement window, and the top floor has a casement window and a mullioned window.	II
Three Mariners Public House; 54.05114°N 2.80310°W		Late 17th century	The public house (formerly the Red Lion) was extended in the 19th century and restored in the 20th century. It is in sandstone with slate roofs. The original part is in three storeys and three bays, with mullioned windows. The extension has two storeys and one bay, and contains sash windows. It is one of two sites in Britain with an original gravity fed cellar and the only one to be cooled by spring water. There has been a hostelry on the site since the 15th Century and prisoners at Lancaster Castle would have their last drink there.	II
73 Church Street; 54.05001°N 2.80284°W		c. 1700	A house, later used as an office, in roughcast sandstone with a slate roof. There are three storeys with cellars, and four bays. The doorway in the fourth bay has a cornice on pilasters, and the windows are sashes. There is a rear wing, and a two-storey bow window.	II
22 and 24 Market Street; 54.04882°N 2.80082°W		c. 1700	Originating as a house, and later used as shops and an annexe to a public house, it is in sandstone with a slate roof. The building has three storeys with a cellar, and four bays with a rear wing, giving it an L-shaped plan. In the ground floor are modern shop fronts, and above are replacements of the original windows.	II
Friends' Meeting House; 54.04845°N 2.80649°W		1708	The meeting house has been subsequently altered and extended. It is in sandstone with a pebbledashed front, and a roof partly of stone-slate, and partly in slate. The building is in one storey with an attic and a two-storey porch with canted sides on the front. There are three bays to the left of the porch and five to the right. The windows are sashes. There is a Venetian window in the east gable wall.	II*
20 Castle Park; 54.04914°N 2.80513°W		1720	A roughcast sandstone house with a slate roof, in three storeys with cellars and attics, a symmetrical five-bay front, and a square projection at the rear. All the windows have moulded architraves and contain sashes. The central doorway has engaged Ionic columns, a pulvinated frieze, an entablature with dentils, and a segmental open pediment. Above the doorway, between the top storeys, is a datestone.	II*
	1720	Two rows of six almshouses opposite each other, with a chapel at the west end and an arched entrance gateway at the east, all in sandstone, forming a courtyard. The houses are in a single storey, each with one bay, mullioned and transomed windows, and a gable with a ball finial. The chapel has a round-headed doorway, a bellcote, and a shaped gable with a ball finial.	II*	
18 and 18A Castle Park and privy 54.04916°N 2.80532°W		Early 18th century	Originally a coach house and stables, later converted into flats above garages. They are in sandstone with a stone-slate roof, and have a front of two storeys and six bays. On the front are two coach house doorways, and two stable doors with a doorway in the left bay and a window in the right bay. In the upper floor are sash windows, two of which are round-headed. At the rear is a brick privy house with stone dressings containing seven privy seats.	II*
22 Castle Park; 54.04912°N 2.80499°W		Early 18th century	A long extension was added to the rear of the house in 1765–66, and it was refronted in about 1800. The house is in sandstone with a slate roof, and has an L-shaped plan. It has three storeys over a cellar, and a two-bay front. The door on the left is approached by five steps, and has a moulded architrave, a pulvinated frieze, a cornice, and a fanlight. The windows are sashes. At the rear is a round-headed stair window with Gothick glazing.	II*
37–43 China Street; 54.04917°N 2.80311°W		Early 18th century	A terrace of three houses, later used as four shops. They are in sandstone with a slate roof, in three storeys with cellars, with a front of nine bays, and extensions at the rear. In the ground floor are shop fronts, the windows in the middle floor have Tuscan pilasters, and those on the top floor have plain surrounds.	II
6 Church Street; 54.04956°N 2.79877°W		Early 18th century	Originally a house, later converted into a shop, in rendered sandstone with a slate roof. It has two full storeys and one low storey. In the ground floor is a shop front with an entrance leading to a yard on the left. In the middle floor are two sash windows, and in the top floor there are two fixed windows.	II
42 and 44 Church Street; 54.04975°N 2.80059°W		Early 18th century	This originated as a house, and was later converted into two shops. It is in sandstone with a slate roof, and has three storeys, a basement, and three wide bays. In the ground floor are shop fronts, and above are sash windows. Inside many of the rooms have retained their original panelling.	II*
54 Church Street; 54.04989°N 2.80121°W		Early 18th century	Two houses, later converted into a shop, in sandstone with a slate roof. There are three storeys over a cellar at the front, and four storeys at the rear. On the front are four bays with the doorway in the second bay. All the openings have moulded architraves, the windows are sashes, and in the ground floor is a shop front.	II
59 Market Street; 54.04866°N 2.80258°W		Early 18th century	A rendered house with a slate roof, later used as a shop, with three low storeys and a single bay. The ground floor contains a shop front, in the middle floor is a sash window, and the top floor has two casement windows separated by a mullion.	II
The 1725 (formerly the Blue Anchor Public House); 54.04888°N 2.80096°W		Early 18th century	Houses later converted into a public house, in roughcast sandstone and with a slate roof. It has three storeys with cellars, and the west front has three bays. On the front are sash windows, and at the rear the windows are mullioned. The building currently houses a Spanish tapas bar.	II
Stonewell Tavern; 54.04957°N 2.79895°W		Early 18th century	Originally two houses, later combined into one public house. The older house is on the right, it has two low rendered storeys with a tile roof. The ground floor is occupied by a large three-light window, with a small casement window above. The house on the left dates from the early 19th century, it is in sandstone with a slate roof, in three storeys with a basement, and with two bays. The doorway is approached by six steps, and the windows are of different types.	II
Music room 54.04919°N 2.80298°W		c. 1730	This originated as a summer house, it was restored in the 1970s, and then used as a shop and a flat. It is in sandstone with a slate roof, and has three storeys, three bays, and a balustraded parapet. The bays are divided by pilasters, fluted Ionic on the ground floor, fluted Corinthian in the middle floor, and panelled in the top floor. In the ground floor is a central round-headed archway, now glazed, flanked by doorways with architraves. The windows are sashes, the window above the archway having a swan-neck pediment and a central urn. Inside is richly decorated plasterwork.	II*
15 and 17 Castle Hill; 54.04957°N 2.80405°W		1739	A pair of cottages, later partly converted into a museum. They are in sandstone with a stone-slate] roof, in two low storeys and with a front of three bays. There are paired doorways with lintels, one of which is inscribed with initials and the date. The windows are sashes of varying sizes. At the rear is a well.	II
2 Castle Hill; 54.04995°N 2.80377°W		Mid-18th century	Originally a house, later used as offices, in sandstone with a slate roof. It has three storeys, five bays on the front, and three on the side. All the openings have plain surrounds, the central doorway is approached by five steps, and the windows are sashes. At the rear is a stair window.	II
3 Castle Hill; 54.04989°N 2.80367°W		Mid-18th century	A house, later used for other purposes, in sandstone with a slate roof. It has three storeys with a cellar, and a front of three bays. The doorway is in the right bay and is approached by two steps. The windows have plain surrounds, and contain 20th-century top-hung casements.	II
6–12 Castle Hill; 54.04978°N 2.80407°W		Mid-18th century	A former warehouse and three cottages, the cottages dating from the early 19th century. They are in sandstone, the cottages with a stone-slate roof and the warehouse with a tiled roof. The cottages have three storeys, and each has a single bay. The former warehouse has been converted into domestic use, it is gabled, in three storeys with an attic, and has a central glazed loading slot.	II
7 Castle Hill; 54.04979°N 2.80380°W		Mid-18th century	A house, later converted into flats, in sandstone with a stone-slate roof. It has three storeys, an attic, a cellar, and a four-bay front. All the openings have plain surrounds, and the windows are sashes. In the attic is a dormer.	II
29 Castle Hill; 54.04895°N 2.80395°W		Mid-18th century	Originally a warehouse, later extended and converted for other uses, it is in sandstone with slate roofs. The original part has a symmetrical gabled front in three storeys, with two loading slots and a steel crane between them. To the right is a two-storey extension with two timber-framed gables on the right return, one containing an oriel window, and to the right of this is a further single-storey extension.	II
8 Castle Park; 54.04930°N 2.80601°W		Mid-18th century	A sandstone house with a slate roof that was raised by a storey in 1854. It has three storeys and a cellar, a front of two wide bays, and an extension to the rear. All the openings have moulded architraves. The doorway has a fanlight with decorative glazing, and the windows are sashes.	II
10, 12 and 14 Castle Park; 54.04927°N 2.80579°W		Mid-18th century	A row of three sandstone houses with slate roofs in two storeys with cellars and attics. The row has a front of ten bays, Nos 10 and 12 having three bays, and No 14 four, the right bay containing a wagon entrance. All the openings have moulded architraves, the windows are sashes, and the doors have fanlights. Each house has a low hipped dormer.	II
16 Castle Park; 54.04923°N 2.80552°W		Mid-18th century	Originally two houses, later used as offices. It is in sandstone with a slate roof, and has a T-shaped plan. There are three storeys above a cellar, and a front of six bays. The openings have moulded architraves, and the windows are sashes. The doorway in the third bay is approached by six steps with railings, and has a fanlight. At the rear is a two-storey bow window and an extension.	II
Garden wall, 18 and 18A Castle Park; 54.04897°N 2.80543°W	—	Mid-18th century	The garden wall runs south and forms the boundary to No 16 Castle Park. It is mainly in brick, with some sandstone, and is about 3 metres (9.8 ft) high.	II
Gate piers, steps and wall, 20 and 22 Castle Park; 54.04843°N 2.80500°W		Mid-18th century	These form part of the retaining wall of terraced gardens, and are in sandstone. The gate piers are square and have pilasters on all faces, and large cornices. On top of the eastern pier is an urn. There are steps leading up to the piers, and beyond them. The flanking walls are about 4 metres (13 ft) high and extend about 20 metres (66 ft) to the west and 15 metres (49 ft) to the east.	II
7 Chapel Street; 54.05038°N 2.79956°W		Mid-18th century	Originally a house, later used as a shop, in sandstone with a slate roof. It has an L-shaped plan, three storeys over a cellar, and three bays with the remains of a rear wing. In the ground floor is a shop front, and above are sash windows.	II
9 Chapel Street; 54.05046°N 2.79966°W		Mid-18th century	A sandstone house with a slate roof. later used as a shop. It has an L-shaped plan, three storeys over a cellar, and three bays, with a rear wing and the remains of a rear extension. In the ground floor is a shop front, and above are sash windows.	II
46 and 48 Church Street; 54.04984°N 2.80116°W		Mid-18th century	Two houses, later converted into one shop, in sandstone with a slate roof. There are three storeys over cellars, and four bays with a rear extension. In the ground floor is a shop front with glazed doors, and above the windows are 20th-century sashes.	II
15 King Street; 54.04814°N 2.80235°W		Mid-18th century	Originally a warehouse, later a shop, it is in sandstone on a corner site. There are three storeys, three wide bays on King Street, two narrow bays on Old Sir John's Arcade, and a canted bay on the corner. In the ground floor is a shop front. On King Street is a central loading slot, the windows in the upper floors are mullioned; those on Old Sir John's Arcade are sashes.	II
40 and 42 King Street; 54.04704°N 2.80166°W		Mid-18th century	A house later converted into a shop and flats, in sandstone with a composition tile roof. It has three storeys, a cellar, and four bays. In the centre is a doorway with an architrave, a pulvinated frieze, and a segmental pediment. The windows are sashes, and at the rear is a large elliptical-arched stair window.	II
48 and 50 King Street; 54.04693°N 2.80156°W		Mid-18th century	Two houses, later a shop and a house, in sandstone with a slate roof, in three storeys and cellars, each with two bays. No 50 has a shop front in the ground floor. The doorway of no 48 has an architrave with pilasters ending in scrolled consoles supporting brackets carved as lion-masks, and a moulded cornice. The windows are sashes.	II
10 and 12 Market Street; 54.04885°N 2.80044°W	—	Mid-18th century	A house, later converted into a shop, in rendered sandstone with some brick, and with a slate roof. It has three storeys with cellars and four bays. In the ground floor is a shop front, and above the windows are sashes.	II
23 Market Street, 3 Marketgate; 54.04868°N 2.80094°W		Mid-18th century	Originally a house, later altered and used for other purposes. It is in sandstone with a slate roof, and has three storeys. The Market Street face has four bays, with shop fronts on the ground floor. The Marketgate face has nine bays, with blocked shop fronts and a doorcase with Tuscan pilasters on the ground floor. Most of the windows are sashes.	II
31 Market Street; 54.04866°N 2.80142°W		Mid-18th century	A house, later used as a shop, in rendered stone with a slate roof, with three storeys and three bays. In the ground floor is a shop front, and above are sash windows with architraves.	II
44–50 Market Street; 54.04877°N 2.80262°W		Mid-18th century	A terrace of four houses, later used as shops and offices, in sandstone with slate roofs. They have three storeys, cellars, and each former house has a three-bay front. In the ground floor are shop fronts, and above most windows are sashes.	II
8 New Street; 54.04966°N 2.80203°W		Mid-18th century	A house, later used as a shop, in sandstone with a slate roof. It has three storeys with a cellar, three bays, and a rear extension. In the ground floor is a shop front, and above are sash windows with projecting surrounds and triple keystones.	II
12 New Street; 54.04955°N 2.80207°W		Mid-18th century	Originally a warehouse, later used as an office, it is in sandstone with a slate roof. There are four storeys and a cellar. Slightly to the right of centre is a loading slot, with a plate glass window in each floor. On each side is a bay, and there is a 20th-century shop front in the ground floor.	II
16, 18 and 20 New Street; 54.04951°N 2.80258°W		Mid-18th century	Originally two houses and a warehouse, they have been converted into shops. The warehouse had four storeys; it now has a shop front on the ground floor, and the former loading bay has been glazed. To the left, the houses have three storeys, with shop fronts on the ground floor, and sash windows above.	II
26 New Street; 54.04912°N 2.80214°W		Mid-18th century	A house, later used as a shop, and substantially rebuilt in about 1987. It is in sandstone with a slate roof, in three storeys and three bays. There is a 20th-century shop front in the ground floor and sash windows above.	II
47 North Road; 54.05033°N 2.79843°W	—	Mid-18th century	A sandstone warehouse with a composition tile roof, in three storeys and with one bay facing the street. On the front the ground floor contains a doorway and a large entrance, above which are sash windows. The loading slot is in the left wall, and to the right is a lean-to extension.	II
Abbott's Stained Glass Workshop; 54.05050°N 2.79971°W		Mid-18th century	This originated as a house, with a warehouse added at the rear later in the 18th century, and was later used as a shop and a workshop. It is in sandstone with slate roofs. The shop has an L-shaped plan, in three storeys over cellars, and a three-bay front. In the ground floor is a shop front, and above are sash windows. The workshop has a rectangular plan, also with three storeys over cellars, and fronts of three and five bays.	II
Becontree House; 54.04705°N 2.80165°W	—	Mid-18th century	Originally a house, later converted into a shop and a dwelling, it is in sandstone with a tiled roof. There are three storeys with a cellar and an attic, and a four-bay front. At the right end is an altered doorway. The window have architraves; those in the ground floor have been altered, and the first floor windows they are sashes.	II
Gate piers, Friends' Meeting House; 54.04819°N 2.80638°W		Mid-18th century	The pair of gate piers is at the entrance to the churchyard, and they are in sandstone. Each has a square plan, a pilaster on the sides, a cornice, and a pyramidal cap.	II
Malthouse; 54.04925°N 2.79600°W		Mid-18th century	The malt house is in stone with an asbestos sheet roof, and has a rectangular plan. Internally it has three full storeys, a basement and an attic, and 13 bays. The external lintels are in stone, and the internal lintels are in timber, shown by dendrology to have originated in Poland.	II
Ring o' Bells Public House; 54.04685°N 2.80150°W		Mid-18th century	The public house is in sandstone with a slate roof, and has three storeys with cellars, and a four-bay front. In the second bay is a doorcase with fluted Doric engaged columns, a triglyph frieze with carved military trophies between the triglyphs, and a segmental pediment. There is a door in the fourth bay with a plain surround and a fanlight. The windows on the front are sashes. At the rear is an extension with mullioned windows.	II*
St John's Church; 54.05044°N 2.79920°W		1754–55	The tower was added to the church in 1784 by Thomas Harrison. It is now redundant and under the care of the Churches Conservation Trust. The church is in sandstone with a slate roof, and consists of a nave with a semicircular apse, a south porch, and a west tower]. The tower has three stages. In the bottom stage are lunette windows, a rectangular window, and doorways. The middle stage contains clock faces on three sides, and in the top stage are bell openings with Tuscan pilasters and pediments. On top of the tower is a rotunda with engaged Tuscan columns carrying a curved entablature with a triglyph frieze surmounted by a drum with a spirelet.	II*
Assembly Rooms; 54.04809°N 2.80277°W		1759	Built as assembly rooms to raise money for Penny's Hospital, and later extended and used for other purposes, it is in sandstone with a hipped slate roof. It has two tall storeys, and five bays. In the centre is a semicircular Tuscan porch approached by three semicircular steps. In the fifth bay is a doorway with a fanlight. The windows are sashes.	II
1 and 3 Cable Street; 54.05086°N 2.80154°W		1760	A pair of houses, later altered and used for other purposes, by Richard Gillow. They are in sandstone with a slate roof, and with some brick used in the rear wing. The houses have three storeys above a cellar, an eight-bay front that contains a wagon entrance, and a long two-storey rear wing. The two doorways are combined and share a Doric pediment with a triglyph frieze on engaged columns. The windows have moulded architraves with triple keystones, and contain sashes.	II
24 Castle Park and wall 54.04910°N 2.80484°W		1767	A house that became the offices of the architectural firm Paley and Austin from 1871 to 1945, and was later converted into flats. It is in sandstone with a slate roof, in three storeys with a cellar, and has a symmetrical five-bay front. All the openings have moulded architraves, the windows being sashes. The doorway has three steps and a fanlight, and at the front of the house is a forecourt with a wall and railings. At the rear is a stair window and a French window.	II
New Inn public house 54.04904°N 2.80024°W	—	c. 1767	The public house is in sandstone with a slate roof. The left part has three storeys and one bay, and the right part has four storeys, cellars, and two bays. On the front are windows of varying types and an inscribed plaque.	II
5 Cable Street; 54.05095°N 2.80129°W		c. 1770	A house, altered in the 19th century, and later used for other purposes. It is in sandstone with a slate roof, and has an L-shaped plan. There are three storeys and a cellar, and a front of five bays. The central doorway is approached by four steps; it has engaged Tuscan columns carrying a pediment with a frieze. The windows have moulded architraves and contain sashes.	II
1 Castle Hill; 54.04994°N 2.80360°W		1770	Originally a warehouse and workshop, it was damaged by fire in 1985 and converted into flats. The building is in sandstone with a stone-slate roof, and has an L-shaped plan. There are three storeys, and a central loading slot that is flanked by windows. The ground floor windows have tracery forming lozenges and Gothick heads; the upper floor windows are divided into small panes. To the right of the loading slot are the brackets of a former crane.	II
1 Queen Square; 54.04662°N 2.80164°W		1772–73	The house was designed by Richard Gillow, and has later been used for other purposes. It is in sandstone with a slate roof, and has two storeys with cellars. There is a symmetrical five-bay front with a cornice and a parapet. The central doorway is approached up six steps, and it has an architrave, a pediment, and a fanlight. The windows are sashes.	II
United Reformed Church; 54.04689°N 2.80249°W		1772–73	Originally an Independent, then a Congregational church, it was doubled in size in 1833 with an extension at the rear at right angles. The church is in sandstone and a slate roof. The symmetrical west façade has two storeys and five bays. The windows in the upper storey have round heads, keystones, and impost blocks, and on the front is a datestone. Inside the church is a gallery on three sides and box pews.	II
78 and 80 Church Street; 54.05023°N 2.80288°W		1772–75	A house. later divided into two houses, and then used as offices, in sandstone with a slate roof.. There are three storeys with a cellar, and the main part has a front of five bays. The central bay projects forward as a bow, and contains a door flanked by windows, and three windows in the upper floor, all of which are curved. The windows are sashes, and the doorway has engaged Doric columns, a triglyph frieze, and a pediment. At the rear is a Venetian window, and a Diocletian window.	II*
Back entrance, Storey Institute; 54.04905°N 2.80440°W		1770s	This was originally the frontispiece of Cawthorne House; it was reduced in size and moved to its present site in about 1906. It is in sandstone and consists of a Roman Doric portico carrying a triglyph frieze, two cornices, and a pediment. The portico contains decorative wrought iron gates and screens.	II
1A Castle Hill; 54.04998°N 2.80349°W		Late 18th century	A house, later used as offices, in sandstone with a slate roof. It has three storeys over a basement and a front of three bays. The doorway in the right bay has a moulded architrave, an inscribed frieze, and a cornice on fluted consoles. The windows are sashes with plain surrounds.	II
9 Castle Hill; 54.04970°N 2.80393°W		Late 18th century	A sandstone house, partly rendered, with a composition tiled roof. It has three storeys over a high basement, and three bays with an eaves cornice. The doorway to the left is approached by a flight of six steps, with railings, and the basement door to the right of it is also approached by steps. The windows are sashes.	II
23 Castle Hill; 54.04932°N 2.80405°W		Late 18th century	Originally a house, then the studio of the stained glass makers Shrigley and Hunt, and used later for other purposes. It is in sandstone with a slate roof, in three storeys, with a cellar, a later attic, a front of three bays, and a long rear extension. In the ground floor is a wagon entrance, and two large rectangular windows with decorated wooden architraves and stained glass panels. The upper floor contain sash windows, and the attic has a continuous studio window.	II
4 Castle Park; 54.04933°N 2.80621°W		Late 18th century	A sandstone house with a slate roof, in three storeys with a cellar, three bays, and a rear extension. The openings have plain surrounds, the doorway in the right bay has a moulded cornice, and the windows are sashes.	II
6 Castle Park; 54.04932°N 2.80612°W		Late 18th century	The house is in sandstone with a stone-slate roof, in three storeys above a cellar, and with a single-bay front. The doorway, with a fanlight, is to the left. The windows are sashes, one in the ground floor, and two in each upper floor.	II
57–61 Church Street; 54.04987°N 2.80218°W		Late 18th century	Originally two houses, they were later converted into an extension to a bank. It is in sandstone with a slate roof, in three storeys and two wide bays. Along the ground floor is a shop front in the form of a colonnade with six timber columns. The windows in the upper floors are sashes.	II
98 Church Street; 54.05039°N 2.80412°W		Late 18th century	A sandstone cottage with a stone-slate roof in two low storeys with a cellar and two bays. All the openings have plain surrounds. In the first bay are two doorways, one leading to the yard and the other into the house, and the windows are sashes.	II
100 Church Street; 54.05042°N 2.80423°W		Late 18th century	A sandstone house with a slate roof in three storeys with a cellar and a front of three bays. The windows have moulded architraves and contain sashes. The doorway has a moulded architrave, a cornice carried on fluted consoles, and a fanlight containing stained glass.	II
34–38 King Street; 54.04724°N 2.80183°W		Late 18th century	A row of three houses, later used for other purposes. They are in sandstone with a slate roof, and have three storeys with a high basement, and each house has three bays. The central house contains a modern shop front. The doorways are approached by a flight of six steps with railings. There are also railings surrounding the basement area of No 38. Most of the windows are sashes.	II
87 King Street; 54.04654°N 2.80084°W		Late 18th century	A house, later used as offices, in sandstone with a slate roof. It has three storeys with cellars, and a three-bay canted front with a single-storey extension at the rear. The door and windows in the ground floor are modern replacements, and there are ventilators over the cellar openings. In the upper floor are sash windows.	II
89 King Street; 54.04647°N 2.80081°W		Late 18th century	A house, later used as offices, in sandstone with a slate roof. It has three storeys with a cellar and attic, and a three-bay front. The doorway is approached by two steps, and has a cornice. To the left is a low wide lobby entrance, and to the right is a blocked cellar opening. The windows are sashes, and in the roof is a flat-roofed dormer.	II
91 King Street; 54.04640°N 2.80075°W		Late 18th century	A sandstone house with a slate roof, later used as a restaurant, with three storeys, a cellar, and a three-bay front. In the left bay is a tall doorway, with a shop front to the right. The windows are sashes.	II
95 and 97 King Street; 54.04629°N 2.80061°W		Late 18th century	A pair of houses, later used as offices, in sandstone with a slate roof. They have three storeys and a symmetrical six-bay front. The central two bays are occupied by a carriage entrance flanked by blocked doorways, all under a large lintel. All the opening have plain surrounds, and the windows in the upper two floors are sashes. At the rear is a three-stage stair window.	II
66 Market Street; 54.04871°N 2.80362°W	—	Late 18th century	A sandstone house with a slate roof, later used as a shop, in three storeys and three bays. In the ground floor is a shop front, and there is a doorway to the right with a plain surround. The windows are 20th-century casements.	II
11 Moor Lane; 54.04931°N 2.79746°W		Late 18th century	Originally a house, later used as a shop and office, it is in sandstone with a slate roof. It has three storeys and four bays. There is a yard entrance in the first bay. In the ground floor are modern shop fronts, and above there are sash windows with architraves.	II
4 New Street; 54.04978°N 2.80203°W		Late 18th century	A rendered house with a slate roof, later used as a shop, with three storeys and one bay. In the ground floor is a shop front, and above are sash windows.	II
6 New Street; 54.04972°N 2.80204°W		Late 18th century	A house, later altered and used for other purposes, in sandstone with a slate roof. It has three storeys with a cellar, three bays, and a short rear extension. In the ground floor is a 20th-century shop front and a doorway with a fanlight. Above, the windows are sashes.	II
14 New Street; 54.04944°N 2.80209°W		Late 18th century	A sandstone house with a slate roof, later used as a shop, in three storeys and three bays. In the ground floor is a shop front, and above the windows are sashes.	II
22 New Street; 54.04930°N 2.80209°W		Late 18th century	A house, later used as a restaurant, in rendered sandstone with a slate roof. It has three storeys, two bays, and a rear extension. The ground floor contains a shop front, and above the windows are sashes.	II
24 New Street; 54.04922°N 2.80215°W		Late 18th century	The house was later used as a shop and offices, and is in sandstone with a slate roof. There are three storeys and a cellar, three bays, and a rear extension. In the ground floor is a shop front, and to the right is a doorcase with timber Doric columns. Most of the windows in the upper floors are sashes.	II
2 Queen Square; 54.04629°N 2.80100°W	—	Late 18th century	A house later used for other purposes, in sandstone, partly rendered, and a slate roof, with two storeys and cellars. Originally with five bays, it was partly demolished, leaving the right two bays, and there is a rear wing. The doorway has been re-sited in the rear wing, and has three steps with railings, and a cornice on consoles. The windows are sashes.	II
3 and 5 Queen Square; 54.04649°N 2.80162°W		Late 18th century	A pair of sandstone houses with a slate roof, in two storeys and with a symmetrical three-bay front. The doorways are in the outer bays, and have plain surrounds and fanlights. Inside the doorways are paired sash windows with mullions, in the centre is a blind panel, and the upper floor contains sash windows. On the right side is a gabled loading slot.	II
4 Queen Square; 54.04631°N 2.80115°W		Late 18th century	A house, later used as offices, in sandstone with slate roofs. It has two storeys with attics and cellars, a long extension at the rear, and a symmetrical front of four bays. At the top is a wide moulded pediment containing a Diocletian window with Gothick tracery. The first two bays contain a square bay window, and in the third bay is a doorcase with engaged Tuscan columns and a triangular pediment. Most of the windows are sashes, and at the rear is a Venetian window and another Diocletian window.	II
1 Queen Street; 54.04631°N 2.80134°W	—	Late 18th century	A house, later used as offices, in sandstone, partly rendered, with a slate roof. It has two storeys and a front of five bays. Both of the outer two bays contain a single-storey canted bay window. The windows are sashes. The doorway is on the right side and has an elliptical arch with a keystone, and a fanlight.	II
1B Queen Street; 54.04599°N 2.80138°W	—	Late 18th century	This originated as the coach house to No 1 Queen Street, and was later used as an office. It is in sandstone with sides partly rendered, and with a slate roof. It has a rectangular plan at right angles to the street, with two storeys. The gabled front facing the street contains the former entrance to the coach house, with a segmental arch, and a casement window above. In the gable is a blocked owl hole, and to the left is a single-storey extension.	II
4 and 6 Queen Street; 54.04634°N 2.80168°W		Late 18th century	A house later used as an office, in sandstone with a slate roof, in two storeys with cellars. The main part of the building has a symmetrical five-bay front, and there is an additional bay to the left. The doorway is approached up steps with railings, it has a cornice on fluted consoles, and the windows are sashes. In the left bay is a two-storey canted bay window, and on the left return there are two blocked lunettes.	II
5 and 7 Queen Street; 54.04559°N 2.80143°W		Late 18th century	A pair of houses, later used for other purpose, with a front of rusticated chamfered sandstone, and a slate roof. There are three storeys above a high basement, and three bays. The doorways are paired in the centre, and are approached from the sides by nine steps with railings. The doorcases have fluted pilasters, and share a swan-neck pediment. The windows are sashes.	II
12 Queen Street; 54.04591°N 2.80179°W		Late 18th century	A house, later used as an annexe to a school, it is in sandstone with a hipped slate roof. It has two storeys with cellars, and a symmetrical front of two bays and a single-storey extension to the right. The windows are sashes, and the doorway is in the extension.	II
20 and 22 Queen Street; 54.04465°N 2.80178°W		Late 18th century	A pair of sandstone houses, with a slate roof, in three storeys with a basement, and in four bays. The windows have plain surrounds, and contain sashes. The doorways, each with a fanlight, are paired in the centre, and share an open pediment carried on fluted brackets, and are flanked by pilasters.	II
108 and 110 St Leonard's Gate; 54.04995°N 2.79788°W		Late 18th century	A mirrored pair of sandstone houses with a slate roof, in three storeys and cellars, each house having a front of three bays. In the centre the doorways share a doorcase with three engaged Tuscan columns, a triglyph frieze, and a triangular pediment. The windows are a mix of sashes and 20th-century casements. The doorways are approached by steps with railings.	II
112 and 114 St Leonard's Gate; 54.04985°N 2.79813°W		Late 18th century	A mirrored pair of sandstone houses with a slate roof, in three storeys and cellars, and a front of six bays. The central two bays project forward under a moulded pediment. The doorways are in the outer bays, they are approached by steps with railings, and have engaged Tuscan columns, an open pediment, and an elliptical fanlight with Gothick tracery.	II
129 and 131 St Leonard's Gate; 54.04982°N 2.79777°W		Late 18th century	Originally a pair of houses, later converted into shops, in sandstone with a slate roof. There are three storeys, and each shop has one wide bay. In the ground floor the entrances are in the centre, and are flanked by shop fronts. The windows have plain surrounds and contain sashes.	II
10–20 Sun Street; 54.04952°N 2.80258°W		Late 18th century	A terrace of six house, arranged in pairs. They are in sandstone with a slate roof, and have three storeys with cellars. Each house has a single-bay front, and each pair has the doorways in the centre. Alterations include the insertion of s shop front, bow windows and balconies. The other windows vary in type.	II
22 and 24 Sun Street; 54.04941°N 2.80264°W		Late 18th century	A pair of sandstone houses with a slate roof. They have three storeys over cellars, and each house has a single bay. The openings have plain surrounds, the doors are paired in the centre, and most of the windows are sashes.	II
25 Sun Street; 54.04924°N 2.80250°W		Late 18th century	Originally a coach house, later part of a works, it is in sandstone with a slate roof. There are three storeys, three bays, and a rear extension. In the ground floor are two blocked and partly glazed arched openings, and a narrow doorway to the right.	II
1 Water Street; 54.05113°N 2.80030°W		Late 18th century	A house that was restored and converted into flats in about 1985, it is in sandstone with a hipped slate roof. There are three storeys over a basement and a symmetrical front of five bays. Five curved steps with railings lead up to the central doorway, which is treated as a Venetian window, with side lights. The doorway has Tuscan pilasters, an open pediment, and a round-headed fanlight with Gothick glazing. The windows are sashes, and on the left side are three bays.	II
Brown Cow Public House; 54.04730°N 2.79999°W		Late 18th century	Originally a pair of houses, one of which has been used later as a shop and the other as a public house. They are in sandstone with a slate roof, and have three storeys with cellars. Each former house has two bays. There is a shop front in the ground floor, and the windows are sashes.	II
Church House; 54.05043°N 2.80400°W		Late 18th century	A house on a sloping site, later used for other purposes, in sandstone with a slate roof, it has three storeys, a basement, and four bays. In the ground floor is a carriage entrance. All the windows are sashes with moulded architraves. At the rear is a canted bay window.	II
High Street Cottage; 54.04645°N 2.80294°W		Late 18th century	A sandstone house with a slate roof, in a rectangular plan. It has two storeys with an attic, and two bays, and is in Gothick style. The house has chamfered quoins, a cornice on brackets, and an embattled parapet. On the front is a doorway with a four-centred arch that is flanked by sash windows, and with a hood mould and a stair window above.	II
93 King Street; 54.04640°N 2.80073°W		Late 18th century	Originally a house, then a public house, it is in sandstone with a slate roof. There are three storeys, with cellars and attics, and three bays. The doorway has a plain surround with a segmental pediment, and there are two recessed leading up to the door. The windows are sashes, and there is a gabled dormer. (Note: Street View in October 2014 showed this to be the Chenrezig Buddhist Centre)	II
The Bobbin; 54.05095°N 2.79979°W		Late 18th century	This originated as a house, and a public house was added on the corner site to the right in about 1900, the house being incorporated into the public house. They are in sandstone with slate roofs. The former house has two storeys and a cellar, and a three-bay front. The addition has two storeys, and attic and a cellar, with three bays on Chapel Street, two on Cable Street, and a curved bay between.	II
Rawlinson Memorial; 54.05096°N 2.80073°W		Late 18th century	The memorial is in the churchyard of St Mary's Church. It is in limestone and has a square plan. On the sides are panels with inscribed marble plaques and triangular pediments. On the top is a marble urn on a pedestal. The monument stands on sandstone flags and is surrounded by cast iron railings.	II
Slip Inn; 54.04822°N 2.80060°W	—	Late 18th century	A roughcast stone public house with a slate roof, that has been extended to the rear. The main block has three storeys with cellars, and a three-bay front. The doorway is in the left bay. To the left is a lower two-storey five-bay wing. The windows are sashes.	II
Sundial; 54.05062°N 2.80600°W		Late 18th century	The sundial is in the churchyard of St Mary's Church. It is in sandstone and in Gothick style. The sundial has a square plan and stands on a stepped base. The shaft is decorated with panels, and the base of the dial has quatrefoils. The bronze plate and gnomon have been removed for safe keeping.	II
Tramway Hotel; 54.04987°N 2.79768°W		Late 18th century	Originally a house, then used as a hotel, the building is in sandstone, partly rendered with slate] roofs. There are three storeys with cellars, and a five-bay front. The central doorway is recessed and approached by four steps, and the windows are sashes. All the openings have plain surrounds.	II
Gate piers and wall, United Reformed Church; 54.04689°N 2.80289°W		Late 18th century	The churchyard wall and gate piers are in sandstone. The piers are square and rusticated with moulded bases and cornices. The railings and gates are in iron, and between the piers is an overthrow.	II
2 High Street; 54.04730°N 2.80328°W		c. 1775	A house later divided into flats, in sandstone with a slate roof, in two storeys with a basement. It has a front of four bays and an eaves cornice with a balustrade. The left bay contains a wagon entrance, now converted into a door, and to the right is a three-step mounting block. The windows are sashes.	II
4 High Street and railings 54.04720°N 2.80324°W		c. 1775	A house in sandstone with a slate roof, in two storeys with an attic and a basement. There are five bays with an eaves cornice and a balustrade. Above the central three bays is a gable containing a Diocletian window. The other windows have moulded architraves, and contain sashes. The central doorway has engaged Tuscan columns, and an open pediment containing a fanlight with Gothick tracery. The railings enclosing the basement areas are included in the listing.	II
6 High Street; 54.04710°N 2.80321°W	—	c. 1775	A sandstone house, originally a vicarage, with a slate roof, in two storeys with cellars and attics. It has three bays, with a 19th-century single-storey extension to the left. In the right bay is a wagon entrance with a doorway on its left return. At the top of the house is a cornice with a balustrade; some balusters have been replaced by two dormers. The windows are sashes with moulded architraves.	II
Highmount House and attached railings 54.04666°N 2.80319°W	—	1777	The house has been divided into flats. It is in sandstone with a slate roof, and is in an L-shaped plan. The house consists of a main block with a basement, and a front of five bays, a rear extension, and an extension to the left of two storeys and two bays. Five steps lead up to the central doorway in the main block; the doorway has an open pediment on consoles. The windows are sashes. In front of the basement area and in front of the extension are railings that are included in the listing.	II
65 Church Street; 54.04993°N 2.80250°W		c. 1780	Originally a house, later used for other purposes, it is in sandstone with a slate roof. It has an L-shaped plan, with a main range and a rear wing, in three storeys with cellars, and has a three-bay front. Three steps lead up to the doorway in the left bay, which has pilaster jambs, an open pediment on fluted consoles, and a fanlight. The windows are sashes. (Note: Street View in October 2009 showed this to be part of the Sun Hotel.)	II
City Museum; 54.04892°N 2.80168°W		1781–83	This was originally the town hall, and has been a museum since 1923. The cupola was designed by Thomas Harrison, and there were alterations during the 19th century. It is in sandstone with a slate roof, and has two storeys above a basement. The principal face has five bays, a portico with four Tuscan columns, and a Doric entablature including a triglyph frieze. The cupola is octagonal with a square base, a clock face, a rotunda of Ionic columns, a drum, and a dome.	II*
Grand Theatre; 54.05023°N 2.79684°W		1782	The oldest theatre in the town, it was acquired in 1843 by Edmund Sharpe and altered, the interior was redesigned in 1897 by Frank Matcham, and it was rebuilt after a fire in 1908. The theatre is in rendered sandstone with a slate roof, and has a north front of three storeys and four bays. Inside is a gallery, a proscenium arch, and decoration in Free Renaissance style.	II
19 Castle Hill; 54.04950°N 2.80407°W		1785	Originally a dispensary, later used as an office, it is in sandstone with a slate roof. There are two storeys with a cellar, a three-bay front, and a single-storey extension at the rear. The central doorway, approached by two steps, has engaged Tuscan columns, and an open pediment, and above it is a square niche. The windows are sashes, and at the top of the building are a fluted frieze and a moulded pediment with ball finials.	II
14 Penny Street; 54.04837°N 2.80000°W	—	c. 1785	This was originally a house, later used as a shop. in sandstone with a slate roof. It has three storeys and a single wide bay. A shop front has been inserted into the ground floor, with a passage to the rear on the left. The windows in the upper floors are paired.	II
Greycourt; 54.05040°N 2.80423°W		c. 1792	A sandstone house on a steeply sloping site, with a slate roof. It has three storeys over a deep basement, and three wide bays. All the windows are sashes with moulded architraves, and most have cornices. In the right bay of the basement is a former carriage entrance. The doorway is in the left bay, and is approached by steps leading to a terrace with railings.	II
Summer house 54.05135°N 2.80413°W	—	1792	The summer house is in the garden of Greycourt. It is in sandstone with a slate roof and has an octagonal plan. There are two storeys above a cellar. There are sash windows and a doorway. On the top is an octagonal chimney cap. Inside is a cantilevered stone staircase and a barrel vault in the cellar.	II
Duke's Theatre; 54.04914°N 2.79693°W		1795–76	This was originally St Anne's Church, and was converted into a theatre in 1970. It is in sandstone with a slate roof, and has five bays on the south and west fronts. The west front is gabled with a bellcote. There are two tiers of windows, the upper tier having round heads, and the main doorway has a cornice hood on consoles.	II
Palatine Hall; 54.04841°N 2.79749°W		1798	Originally the first Roman Catholic church in the town, with a presbytery to the left, later converted and used for other purposes. It is in sandstone with slate roofs. The former church has three storeys and cellars, and a six-bay front on Fryer Street containing a Venetian window and three round-headed windows. On the entrance front is a porch added in 1859 with Tuscan pilasters, an inscribed frieze, and a moulded cornice. The former presbytery has a doorway with a cornice on consoles.	II
8 and 9 Dalton Square; 54.04762°N 2.79719°W		c. 1798–99	A pair of houses, later used for other purposes, in sandstone with slate roofs. They have three storeys over cellars, and each house has a three-bay front. The doorways are paired in the centre, and each has Tuscan pilasters, a fluted frieze, an open segmental pediment, and a fanlight. All the windows are sashes.	II
1 Dalton Square; 54.04839°N 2.79780°W		c. 1799	A sandstone house with a slate roof, in three storeys with a cellar, and two bays. Above the doorway and the ground floor window is a cornice on four consoles. Over the door is a fanlight, and the upper floor windows are sashes.	II
Pebble forecourt, Castle Park; 54.04921°N 2.80512°W	—	Late 18th or early 19th century (possible)	The forecourt is in front of Nos 18, 18A, 20 and 22 Castle Park, from the front of the buildings to the edge of the pavement. It consists of rounded pebbles set on edge, some of which are arranged in a chequerboard pattern.	II*
21 Castle Hill; 54.04941°N 2.80405°W		c. 1800	A house, later used as offices, in sandstone with a slate roof. It has three storeys with a cellar, and three bays under an eaves cornice. The recessed doorway is approached by two steps, and has a moulded cornice carried on fluted consoles, and a fanlight with decorative glazing. The windows are sashes.	II
67 Church Street; 54.04996°N 2.80259°W		c. 1800	Originally a house, later used as offices, it is in sandstone with a slate roof. There are three storeys above a cellar, a three-bay front, and a long extension at the rear. The openings have plain surrounds, above the doorway is a cornice, and the windows are sashes.	II
17 and 18 Dalton Square; 54.04807°N 2.79826°W		c. 1800	A pair of houses, later used as shops, in sandstone with slate roofs. They have three storeys with cellars, and each shop has two bays and a rear extension. The doorways are paired in the centre and are flanked by shop fronts. Above, the windows are of varying types.	II
1 Great John Street, 2 Moor Lane; 54.04913°N 2.79774°W		c. 1800	A house on a corner site, later used as a club, in sandstone with a slate roof, in three storeys, a basement and an attic. The main front is on Great John Street, with three bays and a broad pediment containing lunettes. The central entrance is approached by a double flight of steps with railings, and the doorway has a semi-elliptical arch and an open pediment on consoles. Flanking the doorway are Venetian windows, and the other windows are sashes. There are three bays on Moor Lane, the left bay having a timber fascia and inserted modern windows.	II
13 Great John Street; 54.04842°N 2.79789°W		c. 1800	A sandstone house with a slate roof on a corner site, in three storeys with a basement, and a front of three bays on Great John Street and one bay on Dalton Square. The central entrance is approached by six steps with railings, and the doorway has a cornice on fluted consoles. The windows are sashes.	II
99 King Street; 54.04621°N 2.80056°W		c. 1800	Originally a coach house, later used as an office, it is in sandstone with a slate roof. There are two storeys, two unequal bays, and a rear extension. The first bay contains a former wagon entrance, now glazed, with a semi-elliptical arch and a keystoned architrave. To the right is a square-headed doorway, and the windows above are casements.	II
26 Market Street; 54.04883°N 2.80098°W		c. 1800	A house on a corner site, later used as a shop. It is rendered with a hipped slate roof. There are three storeys and fronts of two and three bays. On the ground floor are shop fronts, and above are 20th-century casement windows.	II
53 and 53A Market Street; 54.04867°N 2.80234°W		c. 1800	Two sandstone shops with a slate roof, in three storeys and four bays. In the ground floor are 20th-century shop fronts, with remains of an earlier timber front, including fluted Doric columns. In the upper floors are sash windows.	II
19 and 21 New Street; 54.04930°N 2.80191°W		c. 1800	Originally two houses, later converted into a shop, it is in sandstone with a slate roof. There are three storeys and four bays. In the ground floor are 20th-century shop fronts with older Tuscan pilasters. In the upper floors are sash windows.	II
23 New Street; 54.04917°N 2.80194°W		c. 1800	A house later used as a shop, in sandstone with a roof mainly slated. There are three storeys and three bays. In the ground floor is a shop front and above are sash windows.	II
28 New Street; 54.04908°N 2.80217°W		c. 1800	A house, later used as a shop, in sandstone with a slate roof. There are three storeys and a cellar. The building is in a single bay, and has deep quoins. There is a 20th-century shop front, and in the upper storeys are three-light windows that are mullioned and contain sashes.	II
3 Queen Street; 54.04569°N 2.80146°W		c. 1800	A house, later divided into flats, in sandstone with a slate roof, in three storeys and a basement, with three bays with a long rear extension. The doorway is approached by four steps with railings, and has a cornice. The windows are sashes, those in the ground floor having three lights and mullions.	II
14 Queen Street; 54.04577°N 2.80172°W		c. 1800	A sandstone house with a slate roof, later used as offices. It has three storeys, cellars, three bays, and a rear extension. The doorway has a cornice on consoles, and a fanlight, and the windows are sashes.	II
13, 15 and 17 Sun Street; 54.04948°N 2.80239°W		c. 1800	A terrace of three houses in sandstone with slate roofs. They have three storeys and cellars with rear extensions, and each house is in one bay. Most of the windows are sashes.	II
19 and 21 Sun Street; 54.04942°N 2.80247°W		c. 1800	A pair of small houses, later used as offices, in sandstone with a slate roof. They have three storeys with cellars, and each house has one bay and a rear extension. The windows and doors have plain surrounds. The doorways are paired in the centre, the windows of No 21 are sashes and those in No 19 are 20th-century casements.	II
26 and 28 Sun Street; 54.04929°N 2.80272°W		c. 1800	A pair of houses, later converted into shops, in sandstone with a slate roof. They have four storeys with cellars, a front of five bays, and linked extensions to the rear. The paired entrances are in the second bay, and above the doorways is a wide pediment on consoles. The fifth bay contains a wagon entrance, and the windows are sashes.	II
31, 33 and 35 Sun Street; 54.04911°N 2.80254°W		c. 1800	A row of three houses, later used as offices, in sandstone with a slate roof. They have three storeys with cellars and an attic, and three bays facing west and one bay facing south under a pedimented gable. The doorways have fanlights, and each has a cornice carried on plain consoles. The windows are sashes.	II
Five posts, Castle Park; 54.04975°N 2.80633°W		c. 1800	The posts mark the boundary of Castle Park. They are in sandstone and 1 metre (3 ft 3 in) high. Each post is octagonal, slightly tapering, on a moulded base, and with a flattish top. Some have retained their cast iron ball finials.	II
Mill Hall; 54.04883°N 2.79463°W		1800	Originally a steam-powered factory, it closed in 1975, and was converted into student accommodation in 1988–89. The building is in sandstone with a slate roof, in five main storeys with a basement and an attic, and long fronts of ten bays. Features include the cap of a ventilation shaft at the apex of the south gable, a truncated chimney stack, a gabled round-arched loading door in the centre of the west front, and a non-functional iron external fire escape.	II
Royal Hotel and Owen House; 54.04683°N 2.79838°W		1800	This originated as a house, with a public house added in about 1900, and the building has since been used for other purposes. It is in sandstone with slate roofs. The original house has three storeys, a basement, and three bays, and the public house has three storeys and two bays. The windows are sashes. (Note: Street View in October 2014 shows the building to be used as a tapas bar and a shop)	II
Warehouse, Bridget Street; 54.04874°N 2.79760°W	—	1800	The warehouse was converted into flats in 1994. It is in sandstone with a stone-slate roof. There are four storeys over cellars, and a central loading slot under a gable and flanked by windows. Four steps with railings lead up to a central doorway.	II
5 Dalton Square; 54.04806°N 2.79715°W		1801–09	A house later used as offices in sandstone with a slate roof. There are three tall storeys, a cellar, three bays, and a rear extension. The doorway in the left bay is reached by four steps with railings, and has an Ionic doorcase with a pediment. All the windows are sashes.	II
Former National School; 54.04741°N 2.80328°W	—	1820	Originally a girls' school. later used as a house and warehouse. It is in sandstone with a slate roof in two low storeys. There are three bays on High Street under a pedimented gable carrying an inscription, and eight bays on Cawthorne Street. Most of the windows are sashes.	II
4 Fenton Street; 54.04773°N 2.80402°W		Before 1821	The house is in sandstone with a slate roof, has three storeys with a cellar, and two bays with a plinth and a moulded cornice. The doorway in the right bay is approached by three steps with railings containing shoe scrapers, and has a fanlight and a cornice on consoles. The windows are 20th-century casements.	II
6 Fenton Street; 54.04770°N 2.80403°W		Before 1821	A sandstone house with a slate roof, later converted into flats. It has three storeys with a cellar, and two bays with a plinth and a moulded cornice. Three steps with railings lead up to a doorway with a fanlight and a cornice on consoles. The windows are sashes.	II
3 Dalton Square; 54.04821°N 2.79715°W		1824	A house later used as a club, it is in sandstone with a slate roof. It has three storeys with a cellar, and is in three bays. In front of the central doorway is a porch with Tuscan columns, above which is a wrought iron balustrade. The porch is flanked by canted bay windows and the other windows are sashes.	II
Royal Bank of Scotland; 54.04986°N 2.80202°W		c. 1824	Originally the Amicable Society Library, later used as a bank and offices. The building is in sandstone with a slate roof on a corner site. There are two storeys with cellars, and three bays on each front, with a canted bay on the corner. The doorway is in the corner bay, and the windows are sashes.	II
18, 18A, 20 and 20A Brock Street; 54.04738°N 2.79853°W		Early 19th century	Two houses, later converted into shops and flats, in sandstone with a slate roof, and with a T-shaped plan. There are three storeys with cellars, three bays, and a rear central extension. In the ground floor are shop fronts. The openings have plain surrounds, the doorways are paired in the centre, approached by seven stone steps, and the windows are sashes.	II
25 Brock Street; 54.04754°N 2.79831°W		Early 19th century	A house on a corner site, later used as offices, in sandstone with a hipped slate roof. It is in three storeys with three bays on Brock Street and two bays on Dalton Square. The doorway is in the centre of the Brock Street face, it is approached by three steps, and has a cornice on consoles. In the ground floor are modern shop fronts, and above most of the windows are 20th-century casements.	II
2 Bryer Street; 54.04888°N 2.79660°W		Early 19th century	Originally a pair of cottages, later combined into one house, it is sandstone with a slate roof. There are three storeys above a cellar, and a three-bay front. In the central bay are paired doorways, one of which is blocked. All the openings have plain surrounds, and the windows are sashes.	II
2 Castle Park and railings 54.04932°N 2.80640°W		Early 19th century	A house, later used as a school and then converted into flats, it is in sandstone with a slate roof. There are three storeys with a basement, a five-bay front, a two-storey service wing to the left, and a semi-octagonal projection to the rear. The windows are sashes, and the doorway, approached by three steps, has a moulded architrave, a cornice, and a fanlight. There are railings and a low wall in front of the basement area.	II
26 Castle Park; 54.04908°N 2.80466°W		Early 19th century	This originated as a service wing to No 24 Castle Park, it is in sandstone, and has a hipped slate roof. The building has two storeys and one bay, with a doorway on the left. The openings have plain surrounds, and the windows are sashes.	II
22 and 24 Church Street; 54.04956°N 2.79955°W		Early 19th century	Originally two houses, later converted into one shop, it is in sandstone with a slate roof. There are shop fronts in the ground floor, and mainly sash windows above.	II
69 and 71 Church Street; 54.04998°N 2.80270°W		Early 19th century	A pair of houses, later used as offices, in sandstone with a slate roof. They have three storeys, cellars, and a three-bay front. The coupled doorways are in the centre, they are recessed, and have three pilaster jambs, a frieze, a cornice, and fanlights. The windows are sashes.	II
11 and 12 Dalton Square; 54.04765°N 2.79830°W		Early 19th century	Originally a pair of houses, later used as shops. They are in sandstone with a slate roof, in three storeys, each shop having two bays. In the centre are paired doorways approached by two stops, and with fanlights. These are flanked by shop fronts, and most of the windows above are sashes.	II
15 and 16 Dalton Square; 54.04797°N 2.79825°W		Early 19th century	A pair of houses, later used for other purposes, in sandstone with a slate roof. They have three storeys with cellars, and each house is in two bays with rear wings. No 16 has a shop front in the ground floor; No 15 has retained its original doorway, which is approached by two steps, and has a plain surround and a fanlight. Most of the windows are sashes.	II
19 and 20 Dalton Square; 54.04814°N 2.79821°W		Early 19th century	A pair of houses, later altered and used as shops, in sandstone with a slate roof. They have three storeys with cellars, and each shop is in two bays with rear wings. The ground floor of No 19 contains a shop front: No 20 has retained its original doorway with a tripartite window to the left. Most of the windows are sashes, mainly modern replacements.	II
21 Dalton Square; 54.04831°N 2.79816°W		Early 19th century	A sandstone house with a hipped slate roof, standing on a corner site and later used for other purposes. There are three storeys over a cellar, and fronts of one and three bays. In the ground floor is a shop front, and above the windows have been altered.	II
7–11 Friar Street; 54.04872°N 2.79711°W		Early 19th century	A row of three sandstone houses with a slate roof, in three storeys over cellars, each house having one bay. All the openings have plain surrounds, the doorways to Nos 7 and 9 are paired, and the windows are sashes. On the front of No 7 is a plaque stating that it was the birthplace of Sir William Turner.	II
5 and 7 Great John Street; 54.04872°N 2.79781°W		Early 19th century	A pair of houses, later used as shops and flats. in sandstone with a slate roof. There are three storeys and a basement, and a front of three bays. The doorways are between the bays and are approached by steps; each has a moulded cornice. The windows have three lights with mullions, and contain sashes.	II
4–6 Hillside; 54.05050°N 2.80703°W	—	Early 19th century	A row of three sandstone houses with a slate roof, in three storeys with cellars. No 4 has a front of three bays, and the other houses have two bays. The doorways have timber porches and plain surrounds. On the front are two bay windows, and most of the other windows are sashes.	II
7 King Street; 54.04836°N 2.80271°W		Early 19th century	A sandstone shop with a slate roof, in three storeys and two bays. The left bay of the ground floor contains a wagon entrance with a deep lintel, and to the right is a doorway and a window. The windows in the middle floor are sashes, and those in the top floor are fixed.	II
52 and 54 Market Street; 54.04883°N 2.80266°W		Early 19th century	A pair of houses, later used as shops, in sandstone with slate roofs. They have three storeys and cellars, and each shop has a two-bay front. In the ground floor are shop fronts, and above are three-light windows with mullions and sashes.	II
54A, 56 and 58 Market Street; 54.04882°N 2.80297°W		Early 19th century	A row of three houses later used as shops, in sandstone with slate roofs, with three storeys above cellars. In the ground floor are shop fronts, and above each shop is a three-light window with mullions and sashes.	II
61 Market Street; 54.04865°N 2.80247°W		Early 19th century	Originally a house, later used as a shop, in sandstone with a slate roof. It has three storeys and three bays. The ground floor is occupied by a shop front and a yard entrance, and above are sash windows.	II
21 and 21A Queen Street; 54.04494°N 2.80152°W		Early 19th century	A house, later converted into flats, in sandstone with a slate roof. It has three storeys and a basement, and a front of two bays. The doorway is approached from the left by four steps, with railings, and has a cornice and a fanlight. The windows are 20th-century casements.	II
23, 23A, 23B and 23C Queen Street; 54.04485°N 2.80151°W		Early 19th century	A pair of houses, later converted into flats, in sandstone with a slate roof. They have two storeys with basements, and a front of three bays. The central bay contains the paired doorways, which are approached by five steps at the front and sides. The doorways have chamfered jambs and fanlights containing glazing forming a lozenge pattern. The windows are 20th-century casements.	II
25, 27 and 27A Queen Street; 54.04478°N 2.80149°W		Early 19th century	A pair of houses, later converted into flats, in sandstone with a slate roof. They have three storeys with basements, and a front of four bays under an eaves cornice. Three steps lead up to the doorways that are paired in the centre; these have a cornice on panelled consoles. The windows are modern sashes.	II
29 Queen Street; 54.04471°N 2.80147°W		Early 19th century	A sandstone house with a slate roof, in three storeys with a basement, and two bays. The doorway is approached up three steps, it has a console on panelled consoles, and the windows are 20th-century casements.	II
4–10 Sulyard Street; 54.04819°N 2.79636°W		Early 19th century	A terrace of four houses, in two pairs. They are in sandstone with slate roofs. The houses have three storeys with cellars, and each pair has a three-bay front. The central bays contain a pair of doorways with cornices on plain corbels, and fanlights. The windows are of mixed types.	II
John o' Gaunt public house 54.04865°N 2.80245°W		Early 19th century	A house, later used as a shop and public house, in sandstone with a slate roof. There are three storeys and three bays. In the ground floor are a shop front and a recessed public house front with a bow window. The windows above are mostly sashes.	II
Mill 1, Moor Lane Mills South; 54.04815°N 2.79436°W		1826	Originally a steam-powered mill, it was converted into offices in 1989–90. The building is in sandstone with a hipped slate roof. The main block has an L-shaped plan, and is in five storeys, with fronts of thirteen and ten bays. In the angle is a cast iron water tank on a brick tower. To the north is an attached range of one- and two-storey buildings.	II
4 Dalton Square and railings 54.04812°N 2.79714°W		c. 1830	A sandstone house with a slate roof, in three storeys with a basement, and with two bays and a rear wing. The doorway in the right bay is approached up six steps with railings, and has a pediment on fluted consoles. The windows are sashes, and there are railings in front of the basement area.	II
Trades Hall; 54.04744°N 2.80399°W	—	c. 1830	A house later used for other purposes, in sandstone with a slate roof. It has two storeys, a basement, five bays, a plinth, and a moulded cornice. The doorway is approached up three steps, and has a moulded architrave with pilasters, and a cornice on fluted consoles. The windows are modern casements. At the rear is a full-height canted bay window.	II
25 Castle Hill; 54.04915°N 2.80402°W		c. 1840	Built as the residence of the prison governor, the house is in sandstone, rendered at the front, with a slate roof. It has two storeys and a three-bay front. The doorway is approached up three steps, and has timber pilasters, a decorated lintel, and a cornice protected by lead flashing with scalloped edges. The windows are sashes with margin lights.	II
2 Dallas Road; 54.04806°N 2.80522°W		c. 1840	A sandstone house with a slate roof, in two storeys with a cellar, and with a symmetrical three-bay front. The central bay protrudes slightly, and there are pilasters at the ends. The central doorway is approached by two steps, and has a cornice on consoles. The windows have plain surrounds and contain sashes.	II
10 and 12 Middle Street; 54.04726°N 2.80288°W		c. 1840	A pair of sandstone houses with slate roofs, in three storeys over cellars, each with a front of two wide bays. Each house has a central doorway with a plain surround and a cornice. The windows contain 20th-century sashes.	II
St Thomas' Church; 54.04620°N 2.79958°W		1840–41	The church was designed by Edmund Sharpe in Early English style, and the chancel and steeple were added in 1852–53 by E. G. Paley. It is in sandstone with slate roofs, and consists of a nave, aisles, a chancel, a west narthex, and a northeast steeple. The steeple consists of a two-stage tower with a stair turret, it becomes octagonal above the level of the aisle roof, and has an octagonal spire with two tiers of lucarnes, a finial and a cross.	II
Gates, walls and railings, St Thomas' Church; 54.04619°N 2.79983°W		1840–41	Designed by Edmund Sharpe, the gate piers and churchyard walls are in sandstone. There are four octagonal gate piers, each with a pyramidal spirelet, two of which has a finial and the other two have lamps. The gates and railings are in cast iron.	II
WRVS offices 54.04596°N 2.79809°W	—	1844	A sandstone house with a hipped slate roof, in two storeys, with a symmetrical three-bay front. The central doorway has Tuscan pilasters, with sunken panels, a cornice, and a frieze. The windows are sashes with architraves.	II
Former vicarage 54.05102°N 2.80477°W		1848	The vicarage was built for Lancaster Priory, and has later been used as offices. It is in sandstone with slate roofs, and in Elizabethan style. The building has two storeys, attics and cellars, and a front of five irregular bays. There are two parallel ranges, two cross-wings, and a single-bay extension to the right. The entrance has a Tudor arched doorway above which is a shield with a coat of arms and a carved bas-relief, and the windows are mullioned and transomed.	II
Windermere House; 54.04719°N 2.80261°W		1849–50	A girls' charity school, built to replace a Bluecoat school, and designed by Sharpe and Paley in Elizabethan style, it has later been used as offices. The building is in sandstone with slate roofs, and has two storeys, and five slightly irregular bays, each containing a gabled dormer. The doorway is in the second bay, and above it is a niche with the figures of two girls and an inscription. The windows are mullioned or mullioned and transomed.	II
17 New Street; 54.04936°N 2.80190°W		Mid-19th century	A sandstone shop with a slate roof in three storeys and one bay. In the ground floor is a shop window, and above the windows are 20th-century casements.	II
1–9 St Mary's Parade; 54.05020°N 2.80428°W		Mid-19th century	A row of five sandstone houses with slate roofs, in three storeys and five bays. The openings have plain surrounds, the windows being sashes, and the doorways have cornice hoods.	II
15 and 19 St Mary's Parade; 54.05003°N 2.80426°W		Mid-19th century	Originally a row of four houses, later converted into two dwellings, they are in sandstone with a slate roof. The houses have three storeys above a basement, and share a symmetrical front of four bays. The doorways were paired with a cornice hood above, but the left doorway in each house has been blocked. The windows are sashes.	II
21–29 St Mary's Parade; 54.04982°N 2.80420°W		Mid-19th century	A row of five sandstone houses, later incorporating a shop, with slate roofs. They have three storeys and cellars, and each house is in one bay. All the openings have plain surrounds, the first-floor windows are sashes, and the others are fixed.	II
Monument in churchyard 54.05081°N 2.80609°W		Mid-19th century	The monument is in the churchyard of Lancaster Priory. It consists of a rectangular sandstone tomb chest with clasping pilasters on which is a marble effigy of a half-reclining woman. The inscription is illegible.	II
1–9 High Street; 54.04982°N 2.80420°W		c. 1850	A terrace of five sandstone houses with slate roofs, in three storeys with cellars. Each house has a doorway with a simple cornice to the right, and a window in each floor. The doors and windows have plain surrounds, and the windows are sashes.	II
National Westminster Bank; 54.05000°N 2.80179°W		1870	The bank was built for the Lancaster Banking Company, and was extended in the 20th century. It is in sandstone on a plinth of carboniferous limestone, and has a slate roof. The building has a rectangular plan, and is in the style of an Italian palazzo, with two storeys over a high basement, and with a main block of nine bays. The bays in the first floor are divided by Corinthian pilasters, and at the top is a modillion cornice. The doorway is flanked by polished pink granite Tuscan columns, and above it is a frieze and a pediment. To the left is a single-storey three-bay extension.	II*
9 and 9A King Street; 54.04830°N 2.80261°W	—	Late 19th century (possible)	Two shops in sandstone with a slate roof, in three storeys. In the ground floor are shop fronts, the first floor contains two three-light windows, and in the top floor are three two-light windows.	II
Royal King's Arms Hotel; 54.04860°N 2.80341°W		1879	A hotel and shop in sandstone with brick at the rear and with slate roofs. It stands on a corner site and has an L-shaped plan, with four storeys, attics, and five-bay fronts with a caned bay on the corner. On both fronts the outer bays project forward and are pedimented. The Market Street front contains two oriel windows, and the King Street front is slightly concave.	II
Centenary Church; 54.04982°N 2.79835°W		1879–81	Built as a Congregational church designed by J. C. Hetherington and G. D. Oliver in free Early English style, it became redundant and was later used as a public house. The church is in sandstone with slate roofs and red clay ridge tiles. It consists of a nave with aisles and a southwest steeple. On the entrance front is a triple lancet window, a rose window, and two round-headed doorways. The right side has two storeys and five bays. The steeple is 120 feet (37 m) high with a three-stage tower containing one of the entrances. It has a corbelled parapet, and octagonal corner turrets with spirelets. On the top is an octagonal broach spire with eight lucarnes.	II
30 Market Street; 54.04901°N 2.80107°W		c. 1880	Originally council offices and later used as a shop, the building is in Italianate style. It is in sandstone with a hipped slate roof, in two tall storeys with a cellar, and it has a front of four narrow bays. In the ground floor is a shop front, and the upper floor contains round-headed windows and Corinthian pilasters, above which is a dentilled cornice.	II
Block 2, Moor Lane Mills North; 54.04865°N 2.79483°W	—	c. 1880	This was originally part of a cotton mill, and was converted for other uses in 1988. It is in sandstone with a slate roof, and has three storeys. In the ground floor is a wagon entrance, and the first floor contains three-light mullioned windows.	II
St Leonard's House; 54.05054°N 2.79661°W		1881–82	This originated as a furniture factory, and has since had different uses. The original part is in sandstone with a slate roof, in four storeys with a basement, and has a front of eleven bays. The windows are casements. In the early 20th century the building was extended to the left by ten bays, canted to follow the line of the road. This is in brick with concrete columns and timber windows.	II
Waring and Gillow's Showrooms; 54.05114°N 2.79728°W		1882	Furniture showrooms and offices in sandstone with slate roofs, in free Elizabethan style. There are three storeys with cellars and attics, and a front of 18 bays. On the front are four two-bay projections with gables and finials. The second projection is canted and contains the entrance. In the ground floor are showroom windows, and above there are cross windows containing sliding sashes.	II
Church steps 54.05046°N 2.80511°W		1884	A flight of 25 sandstone steps leading up to the churchyard of Lancaster Priory, replacing a previous flight dating from 1761. They are laid in pairs with the tread of alternate steps being twice as long as the previous one.	II
Former Masonic Hall; 54.05011°N 2.80244°W		1885	The Masonic Hall was designed by Paley and Austin in Jacobean style, and incorporates earlier material. It is in sandstone, with two and three storeys and a basement. The doorway is to the right, and in the centre is a canted oriel window with a panelled dado surmounted by a gable. The windows are mullioned and transomed.	II
Pye's Building; 54.05055°N 2.80184°W		c. 1885	A warehouse and office in sandstone with a slate roof on a corner site. There are five storeys with cellars and gabled fronts of two and four bays. The doorway has a pediment, and the windows are sliding sashes.	II
Midland Bank; 54.04870°N 2.80170°W		1887	Built for the Preston Banking Company, the bank was extended in 1924 by incorporating Nos 37–39 Market Street. It is in sandstone on a granite plinth, with slate roofs, and is in Italianate style. The original building has two storeys and two bays, and contains a former carriage entrance and the entrance to the bank. The building to the right has three storeys and three bays. Features on the front include a richly decorated frieze, a balustraded parapet, and an arcade with Corinthian pilasters.	II
Storey Institute; 54.04872°N 2.80419°W		1887–71	Designed by Paley, Austin and Paley, this was originally a school, library and art gallery, and stands on a corner site. It is in sandstone and with slate roofs, and has two storeys with attics. On the corner is an octagonal turret with a dome. The building has faces of three and four bays. The bays have shaped gables with attic dormers between them. The doorway has a moulded architrave and a segmental pediment, and is flanked by engaged Tuscan columns.	II
Farmers' Arms Hotel; 54.04493°N 2.79962°W		1897	Originally two hotels, later combined into one, designed by C. J. Ashworth with Baroque features. It is on a corner site with an L-shaped plan, in sandstone with slate roofs, in three storeys and with 13 irregular bays. On the corner is a wide diagonal bay with a seven-light mullioned and transomed bow window, above which is a cross window, and at the top is a Flemish gable with a scrolled pediment and a ball finial. (Note: Street View in October 2014 shows the name to have been changed to Penny Street Bridge)	II
Barclays Bank; 54.04883°N 2.80222°W		c. 1900	Built as a branch of the Bank of Liverpool, this stands on a corner site. It is in stone with slate roofs, and is in Elizabethan style. There are three storeys with attics, and three bays on both Market Street and New Street fronts, with a bay between them containing the entrance. The doorway is round-headed with Ionic pilasters. At the top of this bay is a gabled dormer with a square finial. On both fronts are gables flanked by turrets. All the windows are mullioned and transomed.	II
Duke of Lancaster Public House; 54.05002°N 2.80300°W		1900	The public house is in sandstone, the upper parts being roughcast, with a slate roof and red ridge tiles. It stands on a corner site, with two storeys with cellars and attics, three asymmetrical bays on each front, and a rounded bay on the corner with a turret, a cornice, a dome, and a spike finial. On both fronts are round-headed doorways, gables, and on the China Street front is a dormer. Also on this front is a two-storey wing, and in the yard is a two-storey stable.	II
Cooperative Store; 54.04980°N 2.80173°W		1901	A departmental store on a corner site by Austin and Paley in Free Jacobean style. It is in sandstone with a slate roof, and has an L-shaped plan. It has two storeys, attics with ornate gables, and fronts of eight and nine bays. The corner bay is canted, and contains a round-headed doorway, above which is a semicircular oriel with a five-light mullioned and transomed window surmounted by a carved panel. Above this is a cross-window with Ionic pilasters, a cartouche containing a beehive symbol, and a segmental pediment.	II
Alexandra Hotel; 54.04510°N 2.79919°W		1902	The hotel is in Free Jacobean style and stands on a corner site. It is in sandstone with slate roofs, and has three storeys, with fronts of eight and five bays and a canted bay on the corner. On the Thurnham Street front is a two-storey canted bay window with a Dutch gable flanked by octagonal turrets.	II
Covell Cross; 54.05012°N 2.80339°W		1903	A commemorative cross to celebrate the coronation of Edward VII, designed by Austin and Paley in sandstone. It consists of a tapering square shaft on a plinth and a stepped base, both octagonal. At the top is a cross-head carved with leaves. On the plinth are carved shields with coats of arms and with inscriptions.	II
Balustrades, Dalton Square; 54.04782°N 2.79799°W		c. 1905	The balustrades surround the garden in the square. There are four quadrants, each balustrade has a plinth, and there are four runs of vase balusters between panelled piers. At the ends of the balusters are taller piers each with a torchère carrying a lantern with an egg-shaped globe.	II
Queen Victoria Memorial; 54.04787°N 2.79770°W		1906	A monument by Herbert Hampton in Portland stone with elements in bronze. A plinth stands on a stepped base, and on the plinth are four bronze lions and a pedestal carrying a bronze statue of Queen Victoria holding a mace. The plinth has a prominent cornice, and on its sides are bronze bas-reliefs portraying notable Victorians and representations of virtues.	II*
Town Hall; 54.04742°N 2.79779°W		1906–09	The town hall, designed by Edward Mountford in Edwardian Baroque style, is built in Longridge stone with slate roofs. It is in two and three storeys over a basement. The main front has eleven bays, the middle five bays having a portico with six giant unfluted Ionic columns, and a tympanum containing limestone sculptures including Edward VII. The flanking bays contain sash windows and a balustraded parapet. On the roof is a clock tower with Tuscan columns, and a dome with a finial.	II*
Garden walls, gate piers and gates, Town Hall; 54.04712°N 2.79694°W		1908	The walls and gate piers are in sandstone and surround the garden to the east of the town hall. The walls have a deep plinth and contain a balustrade of vase balusters between panels. There are two gateways, each with three square piers, comprising a plinth, a panelled pillar, and a cornice. The ornamental gates are in wrought and cast iron, and are surmounted by a panel containing a shield with coats of arms.	II
Town Hall Computer Block; 54.04679°N 2.79715°W		1908	Originating as a fire station, and later used as offices, it was designed by Edward Mountford in Baroque style. The building is in sandstone with slate roofs, it has one storey with an attic, and fronts of five and three bays. The first three bays contain flat-arched doorways, now glazed, and to the right are two windows and a doorway. Above the middle bay is a lunette, on the right side is a blocked doorway with a Gibbs surround, and on the left side is a canted oriel window. Behind the fourth bay is a tower with lunettes, a copper-covered dome, and a weathercock.	II
Lancaster Girls' Grammar School; 54.04576°N 2.80351°W	—	1912–14	The school was designed by Henry Littler in free Edwardian Baroque style. It is in sandstone with slate roofs, and consists of two parallel ridges, two gabled cross-wings, and a separate plainer block at the rear. It is in three storeys with a symmetrical eleven-bay front. The windows are mullioned. In each cross-wing is an octagonal stair turret with a tall battlemented parapet and an octagonal cupola. The central doorway has Ionic columns and an open segmental pediment containing a coat of arms.	II
21 Market Street; 54.04840°N 2.80080°W		c. 1918	Originating as the Palladium Cinema and café, it was converted into a shop in about 1985. The building is steel framed, faced with grey terracotta, and is in Baroque style. It has three storeys and three bays. The entrance and shop windows in the ground floor are framed by Tuscan columns. In the upper storeys are rusticated pilasters and sash windows containing stained glass.	II
War Memorial, Nelson Street; 54.04712°N 2.79696°W		1924	In the centre is a bronze statue of Victory by the Bromsgrove Guild. This is flanked by sandstone walls, each with five bronze panels containing the names of the fallen in the First World War. In front of the statue is a stone tomb-chest with bronze plates carrying the names of those lost in the Second World War and in Korea. In the front is a plain screen wall, behind which steps lead up to the statue.	II
Children's Library; 54.04940°N 2.80178°W		1932	A public library incorporating the façade of the Lancaster Savings Bank of 1823, which is in Greek Revival style. The library is in sandstone and has a flat roof with a skylight. There is one storey and a three-bay front. The outer bays are recessed and contain two pairs of fluted Ionic columns with an entablature and a dentilled cornice. In front of the columns is an iron balustrade. The central doorway is flanked by Doric pilasters, above which is an inscribed panel and a pediment.	II
Public library 54.04906°N 2.80157°W		1932	The library is in Neo-Georgian style, and built in sandstone with a slate roof. It has two storeys, and a front of three bays. The doorway has a flat arch with a triple keystone above which is an inscribed panel, and an open segmental pediment carried on engaged Tuscan columns.	II

== Notes and references ==
Notes

Citations

Sources

- Hartwell, Clare; Pevsner, Nikolaus (2009) [1969], Lancashire: North, The Buildings of England, New Haven and London: Yale University Press, ISBN 978-0-300-12667-9
- Historic England, "Wery Wall. Lancaster (1195059)", National Heritage List for England
- Historic England, "Lancaster Castle (1194905)", National Heritage List for England
- Historic England, "Priory and Parish Church of St Mary, Lancaster (1195068)", National Heritage List for England
- Historic England, "The Judges' Lodgings, attached forecourt, steps, gate piers, gates and railings, Lancaster (1298414)", National Heritage List for England
- Historic England, "Conservative Club and attached railings, Lancaster (1290518)", National Heritage List for England
- Historic England, "Nos 17 and 19 Moor Lane, Lancaster (1194974)", National Heritage List for England
- Historic England, "The Three Mariners Public House, Lancaster (1220003)", National Heritage List for England
- Historic England, "No 73 Church Street, Lancaster (1298412)", National Heritage List for England
- Historic England, "Blue Anchor Public House (part) and rear building on Lawson's Yard, Lancaster (1298342)", National Heritage List for England
- Historic England, "Friends' Meeting House, Lancaster (1211515)", National Heritage List for England
- Historic England, "No 20 Castle Park, Lancaster (1194943)", National Heritage List for England
- Historic England, "Penny's Almshouses, including chapel and screen wall, Lancaster (1195001)", National Heritage List for England
- Historic England, "Nos 18 and 18A Castle Park including attached privy house, Lancaster (1194942)", National Heritage List for England
- Historic England, "No 22 Castle Park, Lancaster (1290779)", National Heritage List for England
- Historic England, "Nos 37–43 China Street, Lancaster (1298409)", National Heritage List for England
- Historic England, "No 6 Church Street, Lancaster (1210214)", National Heritage List for England
- Historic England, "Nos 42 and 44 Church Street, Lancaster (1210232)", National Heritage List for England
- Historic England, "No 54 Church Street, Lancaster (1194913)", National Heritage List for England
- Historic England, "No 59 Market Street, Lancaster (1194969)", National Heritage List for England
- Historic England, "Blue Anchor Public House, Lancaster (1211305)", National Heritage List for England
- Historic England, "Stonewell Tavern, Lancaster (1194911)", National Heritage List for England
- Historic England, "Music Room, Lancaster (1298332)", National Heritage List for England
- Historic England, "Nos 15 and 17 Castle Hill, Lancaster (1290853)", National Heritage List for England
- Historic England, "No 2 Castle Hill, Lancaster (1194936)", National Heritage List for England
- Historic England, "No 3 Castle Hill, Lancaster (1290858)", National Heritage List for England
- Historic England, "Nos 6–12 Castle Hill, Lancaster (1220695)", National Heritage List for England
- Historic England, "No 7 Castle Hill, Lancaster (1194937)", National Heritage List for England
- Historic England, "No 29 Castle Hill, Lancaster (1194939)", National Heritage List for England
- Historic England, "No 8 Castle Park, Lancaster (1194941)", National Heritage List for England
- Historic England, "Nos 10, 12 and 14 Castle Park, Lancaster (1290782)", National Heritage List for England
- Historic England, "No 16 Castle Park, Lancaster (1290789)", National Heritage List for England
- Historic England, "Garden wall extending south from privy house attached to Nos. 18 and 18A Castle Park, Lancaster (1220843)", National Heritage List for England
- Historic England, "Gate piers, steps and wall opposite junction with Dallas Road, Lancaster (1211539)", National Heritage List for England
- Historic England, "No 7 Chapel Street, Lancaster (1194909)", National Heritage List for England
- Historic England, "No 9 Chapel Street, Lancaster (1194910)", National Heritage List for England
- Historic England, "Nos 46 and 48 Church Street, Lancaster (1194912)", National Heritage List for England
- Historic England, "No 15 King Street, Lancaster (1298339)", National Heritage List for England
- Historic England, "Nos 40 and 42 King Street, Lancaster (1194998)", National Heritage List for England
- Historic England, "Nos 48 and 50 King Street, Lancaster (1211077)", National Heritage List for England
- Historic England, "Nos 10 and 12 Market Street, Lancaster (1290126)", National Heritage List for England
- Historic England, "No 23 Market Street, No 3 Marketgate, Lancaster (1211284)", National Heritage List for England
- Historic England, "No 31 Market Street, Lancaster (1211351)", National Heritage List for England
- Historic England, "Nos 44–50 Market Street, Lancaster (1195005)", National Heritage List for England
- Historic England, "No 8 New Street, Lancaster (1298367)", National Heritage List for England
- Historic England, "No 12 New Street, Lancaster (1211867)", National Heritage List for England
- Historic England, "Nos 16, 18 and 20 New Street, Lancaster (1211881)", National Heritage List for England
- Historic England, "No 26 New Street, Lancaster (1212047)", National Heritage List for England
- Historic England, "No 47 North Road, Lancaster (1194982)", National Heritage List for England
- Historic England, "Abbott's Stained Glass Workshop, Lancaster (1290590)", National Heritage List for England
- Historic England, "Becontree House, Lancaster (1210963)", National Heritage List for England
- Historic England, "Gate piers approximately 15 metres south of Friends' Meeting House, Lancaster (1298363)", National Heritage List for England
- Historic England, "Malthouse, Lancaster (1393693)", National Heritage List for England
- Historic England, "Ring o' Bells Public House, Lancaster (1194999)", National Heritage List for England
- Historic England, "Church of St John, Lancaster (1289679)", National Heritage List for England
- Historic England, "Assembly Rooms, Lancaster (1211144)", National Heritage List for England
- Historic England, "Nos 1 and 3 Cable Street, Lancaster (1194935)", National Heritage List for England
- Historic England, "No 24 Castle Park with attached forecourt wall, Lancaster (1290761)", National Heritage List for England
- Historic England, "New Inn Public House, Lancaster (1289986)", National Heritage List for England
- Historic England, "No 5 Cable Street, Lancaster (1220620)", National Heritage List for England
- Historic England, "No 1 Castle Hill, Lancaster (1220647)", National Heritage List for England
- Historic England, "No 1 Queen Square, Lancaster (1212342)", National Heritage List for England
- Historic England, "United Reformed Church, Lancaster (1194996)", National Heritage List for England
- Historic England, "Nos 78 and 80 Church Street, Lancaster (1298413)", National Heritage List for England
- Historic England, "Storey Institute, back entrance, Lancaster (1194906)", National Heritage List for England
- Historic England, "No 1A Castle Hill, Lancaster (1210343)", National Heritage List for England
- Historic England, "No 9 Castle Hill, Lancaster (1290848)", National Heritage List for England
- Historic England, "No 23 Castle Hill, Lancaster (1298386)", National Heritage List for England
- Historic England, "No 4 Castle Park, Lancaster (1194940)", National Heritage List for England
- Historic England, "No 6 Castle Park, Lancaster (1290818)", National Heritage List for England
- Historic England, "Nos 57, 59 and 61 Church Street, Lancaster (1210295)", National Heritage List for England
- Historic England, "No 98 Church Street, Lancaster (1210346)", National Heritage List for England
- Historic England, "No 100 Church Street, Lancaster (1194917)", National Heritage List for England
- Historic England, "Nos 34–38 King Street, Lancaster (1290229)", National Heritage List for England
- Historic England, "No 87 King Street, Lancaster (1211085)", National Heritage List for England
- Historic England, "No 89 King Street, Lancaster (1298340)", National Heritage List for England
- Historic England, "No 91 King Street, Lancaster (1211093)", National Heritage List for England
- Historic England, "Nos 95 and 97 King Street, Lancaster (1211134)", National Heritage List for England
- Historic England, "No 66 Market Street, Lancaster (1194970)", National Heritage List for England
- Historic England, "No 11 Moor Lane, Lancaster (1211607)", National Heritage List for England
- Historic England, "No 4 New Street, Lancaster (1194978)", National Heritage List for England
- Historic England, "No 6 New Street, Lancaster (1211860)", National Heritage List for England
- Historic England, "No 14 New Street, Lancaster (1194979)", National Heritage List for England
- Historic England, "No 22 New Street, Lancaster (1194980)", National Heritage List for England
- Historic England, "No 24 New Street, Lancaster (1194981)", National Heritage List for England
- Historic England, "No 2 Queen Square, Lancaster (1195072)", National Heritage List for England
- Historic England, "Nos 3 and 5 Queen Square, Lancaster (1298301)", National Heritage List for England
- Historic England, "No 4 Queen Square, Lancaster (1212546)", National Heritage List for England
- Historic England, "No 1 Queen Street, Lancaster (1195073)", National Heritage List for England
- Historic England, "No 1B Queen Street, Lancaster (1212558)", National Heritage List for England
- Historic England, "Nos 4 and 6 Queen Street, Lancaster (1212567)", National Heritage List for England
- Historic England, "Nos 5 and 7 Queen Street, Lancaster (1298302)", National Heritage List for England
- Historic England, "No 12 Queen Street, Lancaster (1212593)", National Heritage List for England
- Historic England, "Nos 20 and 22 Queen Street, Lancaster (1212598)", National Heritage List for England
- Historic England, "Nos 108 and 110 St Leonard's Gate, Lancaster (1195047)", National Heritage List for England
- Historic England, "Nos 112 and 114 St Leonard's Gate, Lancaster (1195048)", National Heritage List for England
- Historic England, "Nos 129 and 131 St Leonard's Gate, Lancaster (1195049)", National Heritage List for England
- Historic England, "Nos 10–20 Sun Street, Lancaster (1214477)", National Heritage List for England
- Historic England, "Nos 22 and 24 Sun Street, Lancaster (1288587)", National Heritage List for England
- Historic England, "No 25 Sun Street, Lancaster (1195057)", National Heritage List for England
- Historic England, "No 1 Water Street, Lancaster (1288462)", National Heritage List for England
- Historic England, "Brown Cow Public House, Lancaster (1212267)", National Heritage List for England
- Historic England, "Church House, Lancaster (1194916)", National Heritage List for England
- Historic England, "Crown Inn, Lancaster (1195046)", National Heritage List for England
- Historic England, "High Street Cottage, Lancaster (1194995)", National Heritage List for England
- Historic England, "No 93 King Street, Lancaster (1195000)", National Heritage List for England
- Historic England, "The Bobbin, Lancaster (1290604)", National Heritage List for England
- Historic England, "Rawlinson Memorial, approximately 13 metres north of tower of Church of St Mary, Lancaster (1212472)", National Heritage List for England
- Historic England, "Slip Inn, Lancaster (1298375)", National Heritage List for England
- Historic England, "Sundial approximately 15 metres south of tower of Priory Church of St Mary, Lancaster (1195070)", National Heritage List for England
- Historic England, "Tramway Hotel, Lancaster (1214107)", National Heritage List for England
- Historic England, "Pair of gate piers and wall at roadside, west of United Reformed Church, Lancaster (1210935)", National Heritage List for England
- Historic England, "No 2 High Street, Lancaster (1194994)", National Heritage List for England
- Historic England, "No 4 High Street, Lancaster (1210850)", National Heritage List for England
- Historic England, "No 6 High Street, Lancaster (1298374)", National Heritage List for England
- Historic England, "Highmount House and attached railings, Lancaster (1210914)", National Heritage List for England
- Historic England, "No 65 Church Street, Lancaster (1210301)", National Heritage List for England
- Historic England, "City Museum, The Old Town Hall, Lancaster (1194971)", National Heritage List for England
- Historic England, "Grand Theatre, Lancaster (1195050)", National Heritage List for England
- Historic England, "No 19 Castle Hill, Lancaster (1194938)", National Heritage List for England
- Historic England, "No 14 Penny Street, Lancaster (1194985)", National Heritage List for England
- Historic England, "Greycourt, Lancaster (1195051)", National Heritage List for England
- Historic England, "Garden house behind No.2, Greycourt, Lancaster (1214229)", National Heritage List for England
- Historic England, "Dukes Theatre, Lancaster (1211613)", National Heritage List for England
- Historic England, "No 2 Dalton Square and Palatine Hall, Lancaster (1194918)", National Heritage List for England
- Historic England, "Nos 8 and 9 Dalton Square, Lancaster (1194919)", National Heritage List for England
- Historic England, "No 1 Dalton Square, Lancaster (1210398)", National Heritage List for England
- Historic England, "Pebble forecourt to Nos. 18, 18A, 20 AND 22 Castle Park, Lancaster (1194944)", National Heritage List for England
- Historic England, "No 21 Castle Hill, Lancaster (1220753)", National Heritage List for England
- Historic England, "No 67 Church Street, Lancaster (1194914)", National Heritage List for England
- Historic England, "Nos 17–18 Dalton Square, Lancaster (1210404)", National Heritage List for England
- Historic England, "No 1 Great John Street, No 2 Moor Lane, Lancaster (1298371)", National Heritage List for England
- Historic England, "No 13 Great John Street, Lancaster (1298372)", National Heritage List for England
- Historic England, "No 99 King Street, Lancaster (1298341)", National Heritage List for England
- Historic England, "No 26 Market Street, Lancaster (1195003)", National Heritage List for England
- Historic England, "Nos 53 and 53A Market Street, Lancaster (1194967)", National Heritage List for England
- Historic England, "Nos 19 and 21 New Street, Lancaster (1211982)", National Heritage List for England
- Historic England, "No 23 New Street, Lancaster (1212012)", National Heritage List for England
- Historic England, "No 28 New Street, Lancaster (1212064)", National Heritage List for England
- Historic England, "No 3 Queen Street, Lancaster (1195074)", National Heritage List for England
- Historic England, "No 14 Queen Street, Lancaster (1195075)", National Heritage List for England
- Historic England, "Nos 13, 15, and 17 Sun Street, Lancaster (1195056)", National Heritage List for England
- Historic England, "Nos 19 and 21 Sun Street, Lancaster (1298331)", National Heritage List for England
- Historic England, "Nos 26 and 28 Sun Street, Lancaster (1214479)", National Heritage List for England
- Historic England, "Nos 31, 33 and 35 Sun Street, Lancaster (1214567)", National Heritage List for England
- Historic England, "Posts (five) at south-west end, near junction with Castle Park, Lancaster (1290807)", National Heritage List for England
- Historic England, "Mill Hall, Lancaster (1194975)", National Heritage List for England
- Historic England, "Royal Hotel and Owen House, Lancaster (1195058)", National Heritage List for England
- Historic England, "No 2 Bridget Street Former warehouse behind No 5 Great John Street, Lancaster (1291188)", National Heritage List for England
- Historic England, "No 5 Dalton Square, Lancaster (1210402)", National Heritage List for England
- Historic England, "Former National School, Lancaster (1290274)", National Heritage List for England
- Historic England, "No 4 Fenton Street, Lancaster (1194986)", National Heritage List for England
- Historic England, "No 6 Fenton Street, Lancaster (1194987)", National Heritage List for England
- Historic England, "No 3 Dalton Square, Lancaster (1290475)", National Heritage List for England
- Historic England, "Royal Bank of Scotland, Lancaster (1289809)", National Heritage List for England
- Historic England, "Nos 18, 18A, 20 and 20A Brock Street, Lancaster (1194934)", National Heritage List for England
- Historic England, "No 25 Brock Street, Lancaster (1220062)", National Heritage List for England
- Historic England, "No 2 Bryer Street, Lancaster (1291162)", National Heritage List for England
- Historic England, "No 2 Castle Park and attached walls and railings, Lancaster (1220811)", National Heritage List for England
- Historic England, "No 26 Castle Park, Lancaster (1194945)", National Heritage List for England
- Historic England, "Nos 22 and 24 Church Street, Lancaster (1210225)", National Heritage List for England
- Historic England, "Nos 69 and 71 Church Street, Lancaster (1210324)", National Heritage List for England
- Historic England, "Nos 11 and 12 Dalton Square, Lancaster (1210403)", National Heritage List for England
- Historic England, "Nos 15 and 16 Dalton Square, Lancaster (1194920)", National Heritage List for England
- Historic England, "Nos 19 and 20 Dalton Square, Lancaster (1194921)", National Heritage List for England
- Historic England, "No 21 Dalton Square, Lancaster (1210468)", National Heritage List for England
- Historic England, "Nos 7–11 Fryer Street, Lancaster (1194989)", National Heritage List for England
- Historic England, "Nos 5 and 7 Great John Street, Lancaster (1194991)", National Heritage List for England
- Historic England, "Nos 4–6 Hillside, Lancaster (1290264)", National Heritage List for England
- Historic England, "No 7 King Street, Lancaster (1210961)", National Heritage List for England
- Historic England, "Nos 52 and 54 Market Street, Lancaster (1211373)", National Heritage List for England
- Historic England, "Nos 54A, 56 and 58 Market Street, Lancaster (1298360)", National Heritage List for England
- Historic England, "No 61 Market Street, Lancaster (1298361)", National Heritage List for England
- Historic England, "Nos 21, and 21A Queen Street, Lancaster (1298303)", National Heritage List for England
- Historic England, "Nos 23, 23A, 23B and 23C Queen Street, Lancaster (1212614)", National Heritage List for England
- Historic England, "Nos 25, 27 and 27A Queen Street, Lancaster (1212634)", National Heritage List for England
- Historic England, "No 29 Queen Street, Lancaster (1195076)", National Heritage List for England
- Historic England, "Nos 4–10 Sulyard Street, Lancaster (1214476)", National Heritage List for England
- Historic England, "John O' Gaunt Public House, Lancaster (1194968)", National Heritage List for England
- Historic England, "Mill 1, Moor Lane Mills South, Lancaster (1289875)", National Heritage List for England
- Historic England, "No 4 Dalton Square and attached railings, Lancaster (1298376)", National Heritage List for England
- Historic England, "Trades Hall, Lancaster (1194988)", National Heritage List for England
- Historic England, "No 25 Castle Hill, Lancaster (1220781)", National Heritage List for England
- Historic England, "No 2 Dallas Road, Lancaster (1290511)", National Heritage List for England
- Historic England, "Nos 10 and 12 Middle Street, Lancaster (1289948)", National Heritage List for England
- Historic England, "Church of St Thomas, Lancaster (1195066)", National Heritage List for England
- Historic England, "Walls and railings around the Church of St Thomas, Lancaster (1298338)", National Heritage List for England
- Historic England, "WRVS Offices, Lancaster (1214643)", National Heritage List for England
- Historic England, "Former Vicarage, Lancaster (1195071)", National Heritage List for England
- Historic England, "Windermere House, Lancaster (1298364)", National Heritage List for England
- Historic England, "No 17 New Street, Lancaster (1298368)", National Heritage List for England
- Historic England, "Nos 1–9 St Mary's Parade, Lancaster (1214351)", National Heritage List for England
- Historic England, "Nos 15 and 19 St Mary's Parade, Lancaster (1195052)", National Heritage List for England
- Historic England, "Nos 21–29 St Mary's Parade, Lancaster (1214387)", National Heritage List for England
- Historic England, "Monument approximately 19 metres west of tower of Priory Church of St Mary, Lancaster (1195069)", National Heritage List for England
- Historic England, "Nos 1–9 High Street, Lancaster (1210838)", National Heritage List for England
- Historic England, "National Westminster Bank, Lancaster (1290544)", National Heritage List for England
- Historic England, "Nos 9 and 9A King Street, Lancaster (1194997)", National Heritage List for England
- Historic England, "Royal King's Arms Hotel, Lancaster (1298362)", National Heritage List for England
- Historic England, "Centenary Church, Lancaster (1288711)", National Heritage List for England
- Historic England, "No 30 Market Street, Lancaster (1298343)", National Heritage List for England
- Historic England, "Block 2, Moor Lane Mills North, Lancaster (1289915)", National Heritage List for England
- Historic England, "St Leonard's House, Lancaster (1214180)", National Heritage List for England
- Historic England, "Waring and Gillow's Showrooms, Lancaster (1212101)", National Heritage List for England
- Historic England, "Church Steps, Lancaster (1298328)", National Heritage List for England
- Historic England, "Former Masonic Hall, Lancaster (1210331)", National Heritage List for England
- Historic England, "Pye's Building, Lancaster (1194977)", National Heritage List for England
- Historic England, "Midland Bank, Lancaster (1195004)", National Heritage List for England
- Historic England, "Storey Institute, Lancaster (1194973)", National Heritage List for England
- Historic England, "Farmers' Arms Hotel, Lancaster (1195067)", National Heritage List for England
- Historic England, "Barclay's Bank, Lancaster (1290071)", National Heritage List for England
- Historic England, "Duke of Lancaster Public House, Lancaster (1194915)", National Heritage List for England
- Historic England, "Cooperative Store, Lancaster (1210255)", National Heritage List for England
- Historic England, "Alexandra Hotel, Lancaster (1195065)", National Heritage List for England
- Historic England, "Covell Cross, Lancaster (1290496)", National Heritage List for England
- Historic England, "Balustrades around central gardens, Lancaster (1194922)", National Heritage List for England
- Historic England, "Queen Victoria Memorial, Lancaster (1290440)", National Heritage List for England
- Historic England, "Town Hall, Lancaster (1194923)", National Heritage List for England
- Historic England, "Walls, gate piers and gates to Town Hall Gardens, Lancaster (1298366)", National Heritage List for England
- Historic England, "Town Hall Computer Block, Lancaster (1194990)", National Heritage List for England
- Historic England, "Lancaster Girls' Grammar School (1213320)", National Heritage List for England
- Historic England, "No 21 Market Street, Lancaster (1211244)", National Heritage List for England
- Historic England, "War Memorial, Lancaster (1211793)", National Heritage List for England
- Historic England, "Children's Library, Lancaster (1298369)", National Heritage List for England
- Historic England, "Public Library, Lancaster (1194972)", National Heritage List for England
- Historic England, Listed Buildings
