= Lancaster Roman Fort =

Roman fort in Lancaster, England

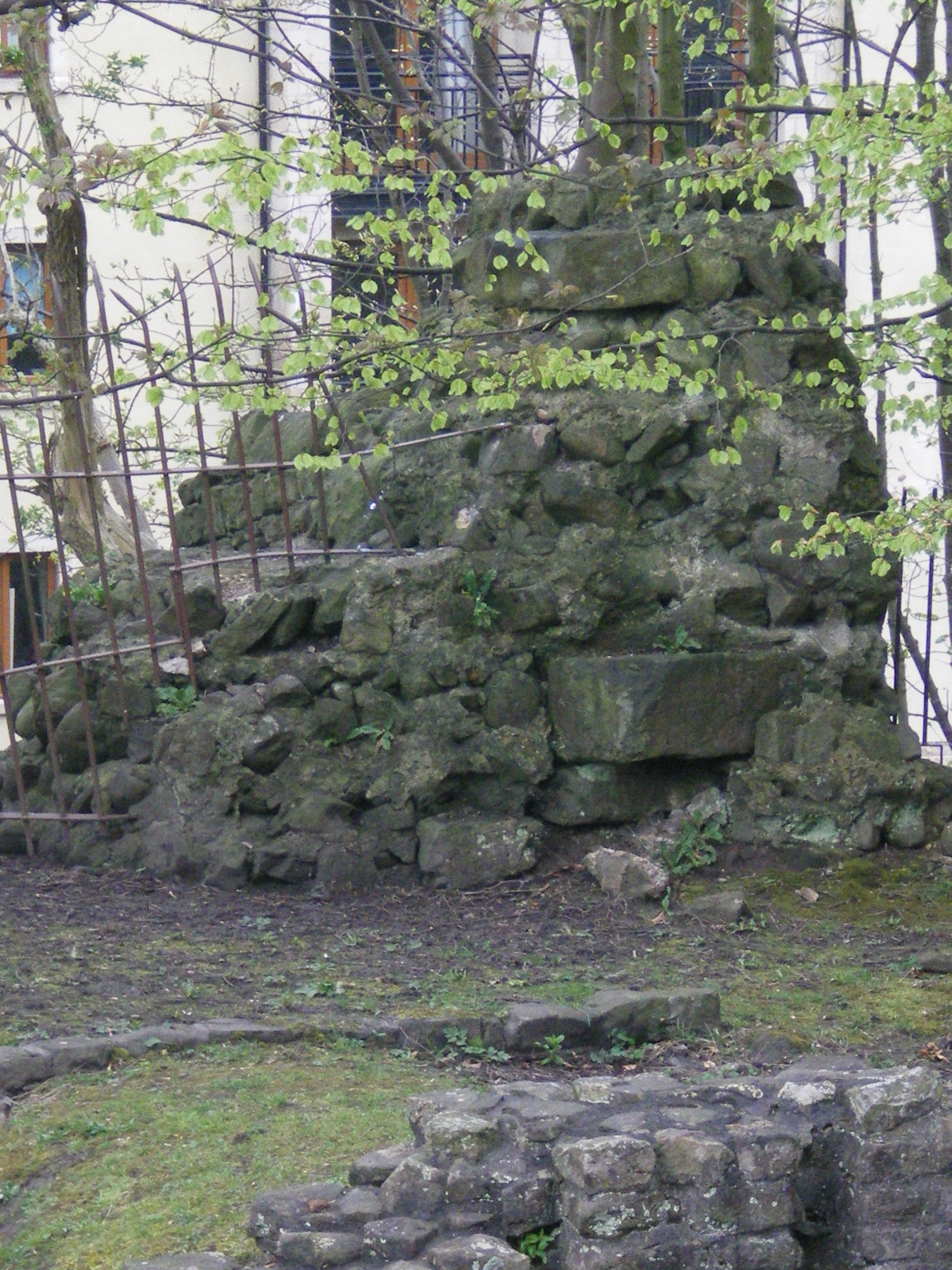
- Surviving ruins of the third fort (Wery Wall)

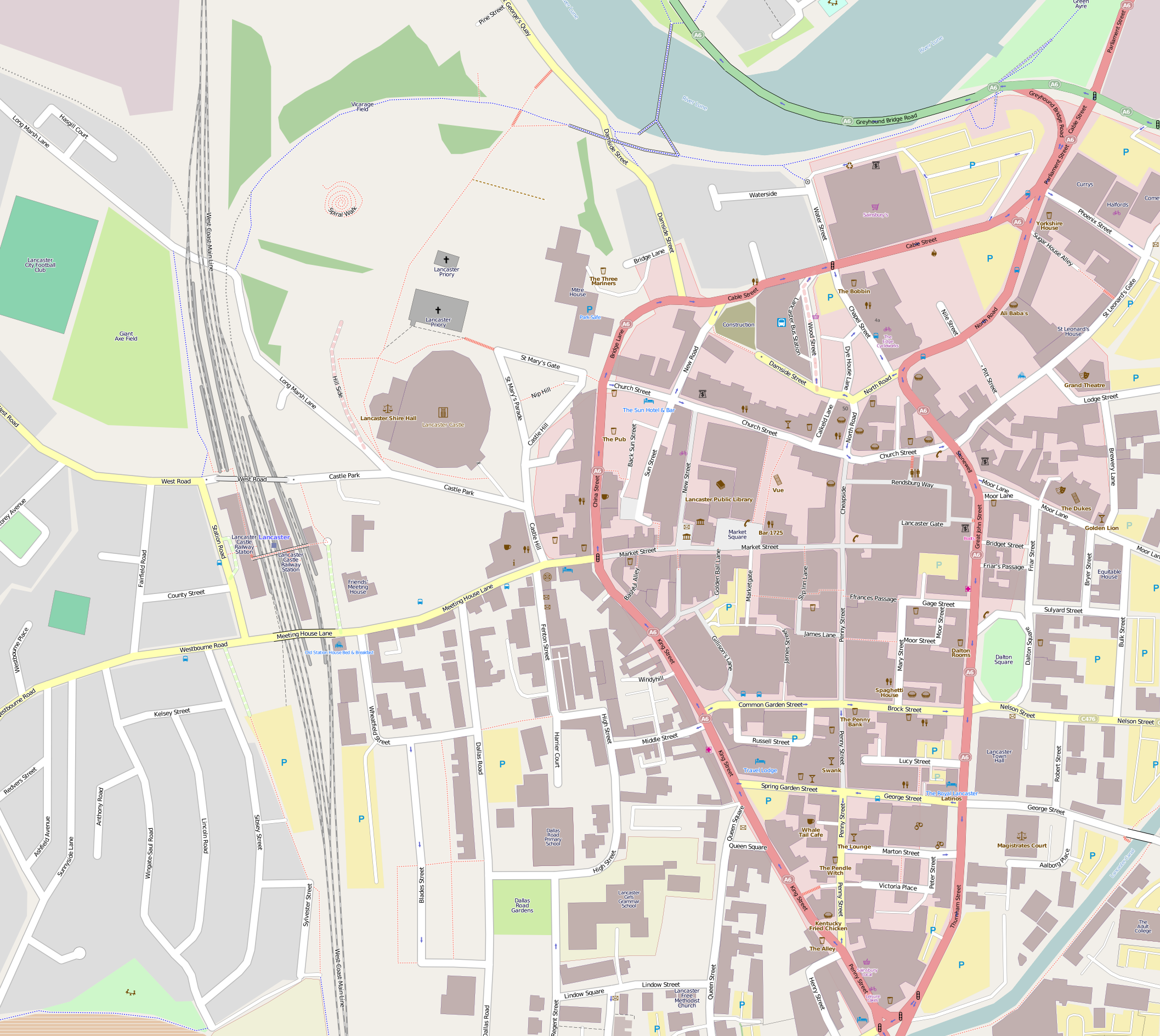
- Location within Lancaster city centre Location within Lancashire
- 54.05150°N 2.80347°W
- Location: Lancaster, Lancashire, England

History
- Founded: c. 80 AD
- Built: Vespasian / Titus
- Abandoned: 5th century

Site notes
- Discovered: 1950
- Condition: Earthworks and ruins

Lancaster Roman Fort, also known as Wery Wall or Galacum, is the modern name given to a ruined former Roman fort atop Castle Hill in Lancaster in North West England. The first castrum was founded c. 80 AD within the Roman province of Britannia.

The fort's name is not known. A Roman milestone found four miles outside Lancaster, with an inscription ending L MP IIII, meaning "from L— 4 miles", suggests that it began with that letter. However in 1998 David Shotter suggested that Galacum, a name that has been associated with the fort at Over Burrow, would be more appropriately applied to Lancaster.

The fort is thought to be the origin of the name Lancaster. It appears in the Domesday Book as Loncastre, where "Lon" refers to the River Lune, with the Old English cæster (borrowed from the Latin castrum) for "fort".

== History ==
The first fort at Lancaster was built out of timber, probably around 80 AD, although Roman coins have been found in Lancaster dating back to the early 60s. It was likely built on this site, now known as Castle Hill, to command a crossing over the River Lune. The fort had rectangular plan with rounded corners, the rampart was constructed from clay and turf with two V-shaped ditches. The main gate was on its eastern side, aligned with Church Street, along which a substantial extramural settlement (vicus) developed. The north wall was about 187 metres (614 ft) long and ran east-west a short distance north of the Old Vicarage, the south side has still to be ascertained (presumed under Lancaster Castle). Later in the century the northern defences were extended by 37 metres (121 ft), before it seems to have been abandoned for a period. For a time during this phase it might have been garrisoned by a cavalry unit called the ala Augusta.

The fort was reoccupied again during the 2nd century and it was rebuilt in stone around 102 AD, with an almost 2-metre (6 ft 7 in) thick revetment wall built in front of the clay-and-turf rampart. The fort's north gate may be located a little way east of Vicarage Lane, from which the road led to the crossing over the river. Earthworks visible at Vicarage Field are thought to be remains of the northwest corner. Little is known about the following two centuries. There seems to have been periods of abandonment during the mid-second century and again around the start of the third. An inscription has been found recording re-building work on a bath-house and the basilica in the middle of the 3rd century. Around this time it seems to have been garrisoned by the ala Sebosiana and the numerus Barcariorum Tigrisiensium.

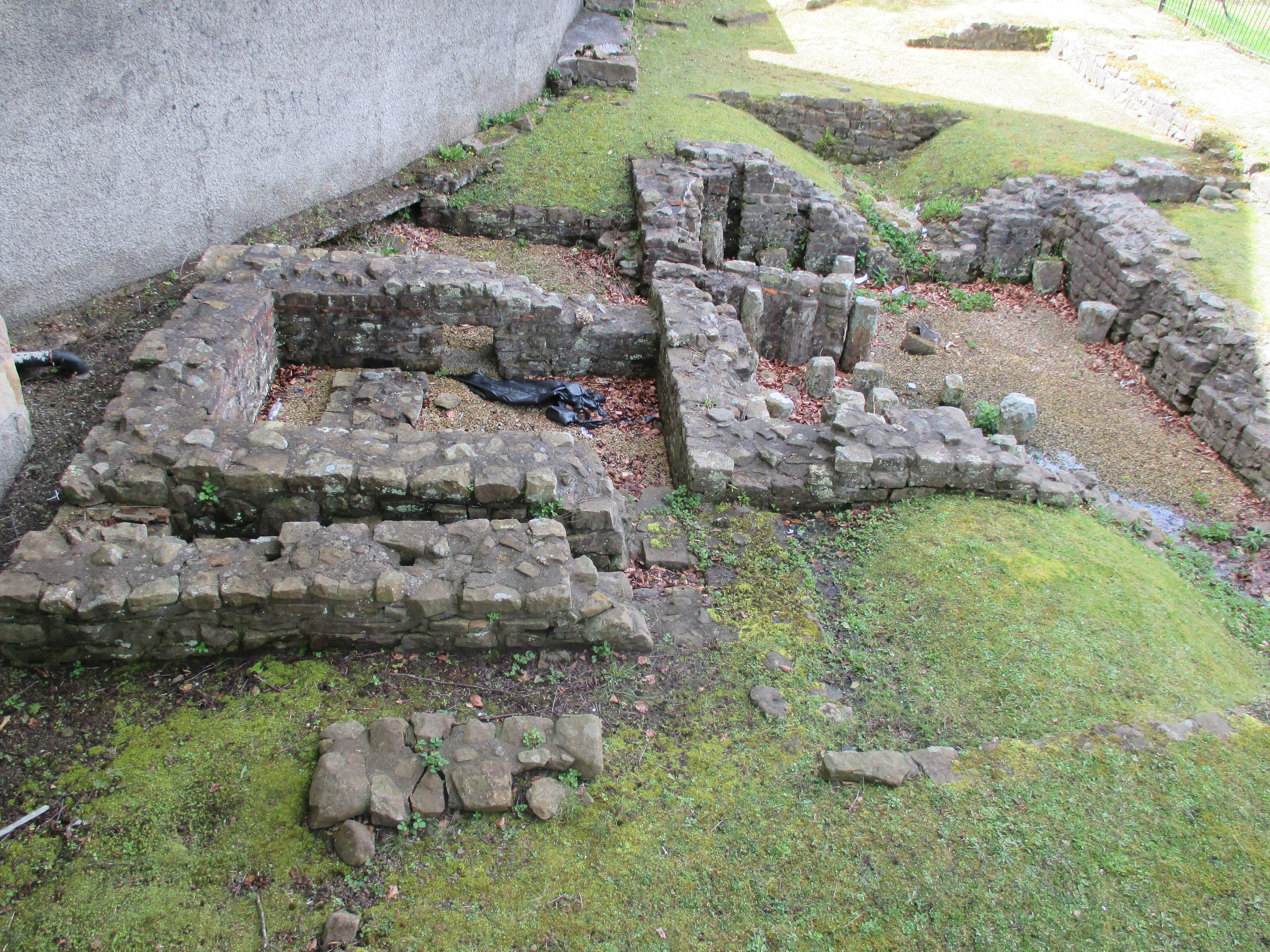
Roman bath house on Castle Hill

Around 330 AD the fort underwent a drastic remodelling in a style similar to the Saxon Shore Forts. On the northern side, an approximately 3 metres (9.8 ft) thick wall with polygonal external bastions, was constructed in a south westerly direction, over the remains of the earlier forts. The only surviving ruined wall of the 4th-century fort, identified as part of the fort in 1950, is now known as Wery Wall. It is thought to be the core of the external bastion at the northern angle of the wall's circuit and was likely topped with a heavy artillery piece. In the 18th century, a fragment of the south wall was recorded, noticeably not parallel to the north, but thought to belong this fort, suggesting it did not follow the classic Roman plan.

Next to the Wery Wall (near the junction of Bridge Lane and Church Street), the remains of a bath-house incorporating a reused inscription of the Gallic Emperor Postumus, dating from 262–266 AD, were discovered in 1812. In the 1950s it was still thought to be contemporary with the 4th-century fort. However it has since been found to have been associated with a large courtyard building, possibly an important residence or maybe a 'mansio' within the vicus area, demolished to make way for the 4th-century construction.

The fort underwent a few more extensions, and at its largest area it was 9–10 acres (3.6–4.0 ha). The evidence suggests that the fort remained active up to the end of Roman occupation of Britain in the early 5th century. The later fort is the only known example of this type in northwest Britain.

Little is known of the history of the fort afterwards, until the founding of the Benedictine priory (along with Lancaster Castle, it is supposed) by Roger de Poitou in 1094. A Saxon monastery was probably built on the site during the sixth century until it was demolished and replaced by the Benedictine priory in 1094.

The area is a protected scheduled monument. The Wery Wall is also a Grade II listed building.

== Recent discoveries ==
In March 2023, students from the Lancaster University announced the discovery of a Romano-Celtic religious temple near the castle during a hydrogeophysics training session.

== See also ==
- Over Burrow Roman Fort, another fort in Lancaster district
- Listed buildings in Lancaster, Lancashire
- Scheduled monuments in Lancashire

== Bibliography ==
- Historic England. "Part of a Roman fort and its associated vicus and remains of a pre-Conquest monastery and a Benedictine priory on Castle Hill (1020668)". National Heritage List for England.
- Historic England. "Wery Wall. Lancaster (1195059)". National Heritage List for England.
- Champness, John (1993). Lancaster Castle: A Brief History. Lancashire County Books. ISBN 1-871236-26-6.
- Ekwall, Eilert (1960), The Concise Oxford Dictionary of English Placenames (4 ed.), Oxford University Press, ISBN 0198691033
- Richmond, Ian (1953). "Excavations on the site of the Roman Fort at Lancaster, 1950" (PDF). Transactions of the Historic Society of Lancashire and Cheshire. 105: 1–23.
- Rivet, A. L. F.; Smith, Colin (1979). The Place-Names of Roman Britain. London: B. T. Batsford. p. 382. ISBN 0713420774.
- Schofield, Peter (2011). Wery Wall and Bath House, Castle Hill, Lancaster, Lancashire: Historic Landscape Survey Report (PDF). Oxford Archaeology North.
- Shotter, David (1998). "Roman Names for Roman Sites in North West England" (PDF). Contrebis. 23. Lancaster Archaeological and Historical Society. ISSN 0307-5087. OCLC 4447474.
- Shotter, David (2001). "Roman Lancaster: Site and Settlement". A History of Lancaster. Edinburgh: Edinburgh University Press. pp. 3–31. ISBN 0-7486-1466-4.
