= Lancaster Priory =

Coordinates: 54.0507°N 2.8057°W

- Priory Church of St Mary
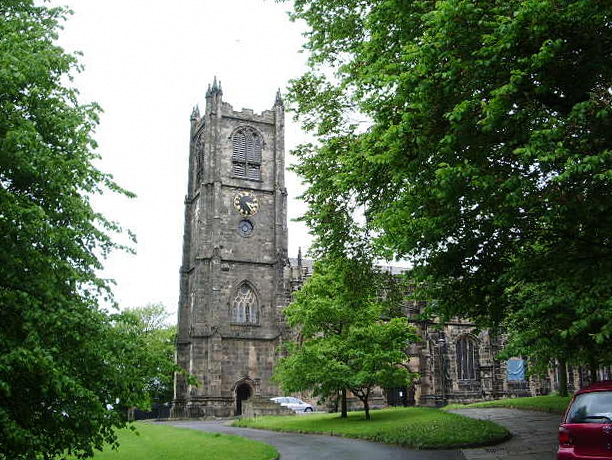
- Lancaster Priory

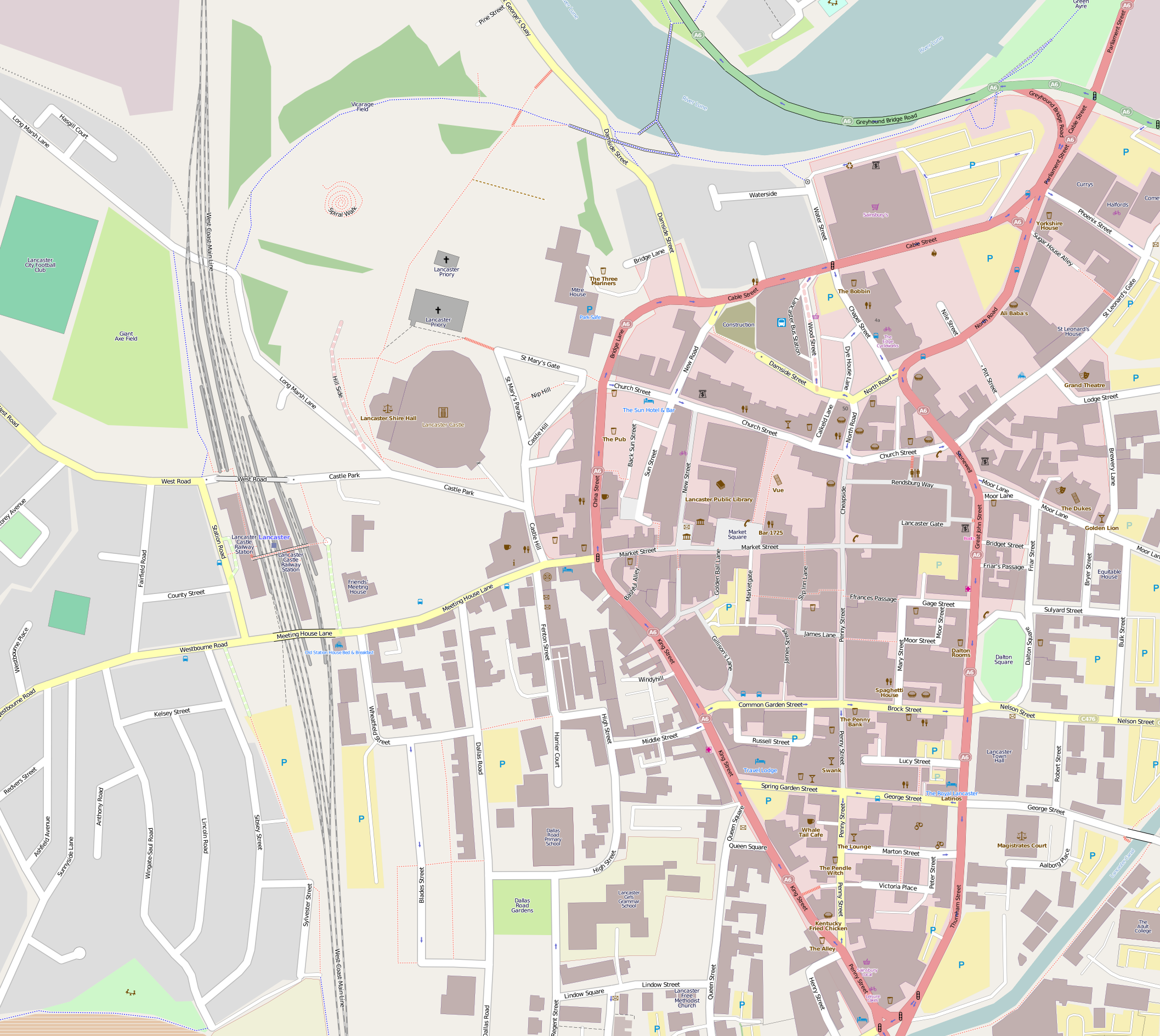
- Location in Lancaster
- OS grid reference: SD 474,619
- Location: Lancaster, Lancashire
- Country: England
- Denomination: Church of England
- Churchmanship: High church/Liberal Anglo-Catholic
- Website: Lancaster Priory

History
- Status: Parish church
- Dedication: St Mary

Architecture
- Functional status: Active
- Heritage designation

Listed Building – Grade I
- Designated: 22 December 1953
- Reference no.: 1195068
- Architect(s): Henry Sephton; Paley and Austin; Austin and Paley
- Architectural type: Church

Specifications
- Capacity: 600
- Length: 145 feet (44 m)
- Materials: Sandstone; Slate and lead roofs

Administration
- Province: York
- Diocese: Blackburn
- Archdeaconry: Lancaster
- Deanery: Lancaster and Morecambe
- Parish: Lancaster St Mary with St John and St Anne

Clergy
- Vicar: Revd Leah Vasey-Saunders

Lancaster Priory, formally the Priory Church of St Mary, is the Church of England parish church of the city of Lancaster, Lancashire, England. It is located near Lancaster Castle and since 1953 has been designated a Grade I listed building. It is in the deanery of Lancaster, the archdeaconry of Lancaster and the Diocese of Blackburn. Its benefice is combined with that of St John and St Anne.

== History ==
=== Pre-construction ===
A Roman fort existed on the site from the 1st century, and some form of church may possibly have been established around the year 200. A Saxon church is thought to have stood on the site from the sixth century. In 1912 excavations revealed a wall beneath the present chancel area which may be from Roman times, and a small Saxon doorway has been exposed in the west wall of the present nave. It also believed that a monastery had been established here before the Norman conquest of England.

=== Construction to 17th century ===
In 1094 Roger de Poitou established a Benedictine priory dedicated to St Mary, as a cell of the Abbey of Saint Martin of Sées in Normandy, France. Around 1360 the nave was widened to about 49 feet (15 m). In 1431 the church was transferred from Sées to Syon Abbey near London after which there was a major reconstruction in the Perpendicular style. In 1539 this Catholic monastic institution was abolished by Henry VIII and the following year the priory became a parish church. A restoration of the church occurred in 1558.

=== 18th to 20th centuries ===
In 1743 it was decided to raise the steeple 10 yards higher so that the bells could be heard better, and the bells were re-cast. In 1753, the tower was determined to be in danger of collapse and the bells were removed. Henry Sephton was commissioned to demolish and rebuild the tower. In 1759 a new tower was erected, which still stands.

An organ was installed between 1809 and 1811 by George Pike England at a cost of £672. Between 1868 and 1871 the local architects Paley and Austin restored the chancel, and added a new organ chamber and vestry. In 1872 the old organ was replaced by a new one in the north aisle. In 1887 a peal of eight new bells, donated by James Williamson, was rung for the first time and in 1894 a clergy vestry was built adjacent to the choir vestry. A south porch designed by Austin and Paley was added in 1903 and in the same year an outer north aisle with a polygonal apse was built. This aisle is the memorial chapel to the King's Own Royal Lancaster Regiment. In 1922 the organ was rebuilt by Harrison & Harrison of Durham. In 1972 the bells were overhauled and re-hung. The pipe organ was replaced in 1982 by an electronic organ made by J. and J. Makin, and in the same year the choir and clergy vestries were converted into a refectory. In 2012 a pipe organ was installed by David Wells Organ Builder of Liverpool. It restored to use two redundant instruments, now linked into one scheme played from a single detached console. The organ in the west gallery was built by Henry Willis for St John's Church, Blackpool in 1915, and the organ in the north choir aisle was built by Harrison and Harrison in 1908 for Blackburn Girls’ School.

== Architecture ==
=== Exterior ===
The church is built in sandstone with roofs of slate and lead. Its plan consists of a west tower, a four-bay nave and a four-bay chancel with a clerestory under a continuous roof, north and south aisles and a south porch. At the east end of the north aisle is St Nicholas' chapel and at the east end of the south aisle is St Thomas' chapel. To the north of the north aisle, occupying the west four bays, is the King's Own Regiment Memorial chapel and to the east of this is the refectory and kitchen. The parapets of the aisles and nave are embattled. The south porch has two storeys with a staircase turret to the east, and crocketed pinnacles. The east window has five lights and Perpendicular tracery. The tower is in four stages surmounted by corner pinnacles and an embattled parapet. In the first stage is a south doorway and above this in the second stage is a four-light window. The third stage has a round window above which is a clock face. The bell openings in the fourth stage have four lights.

=== Interior ===
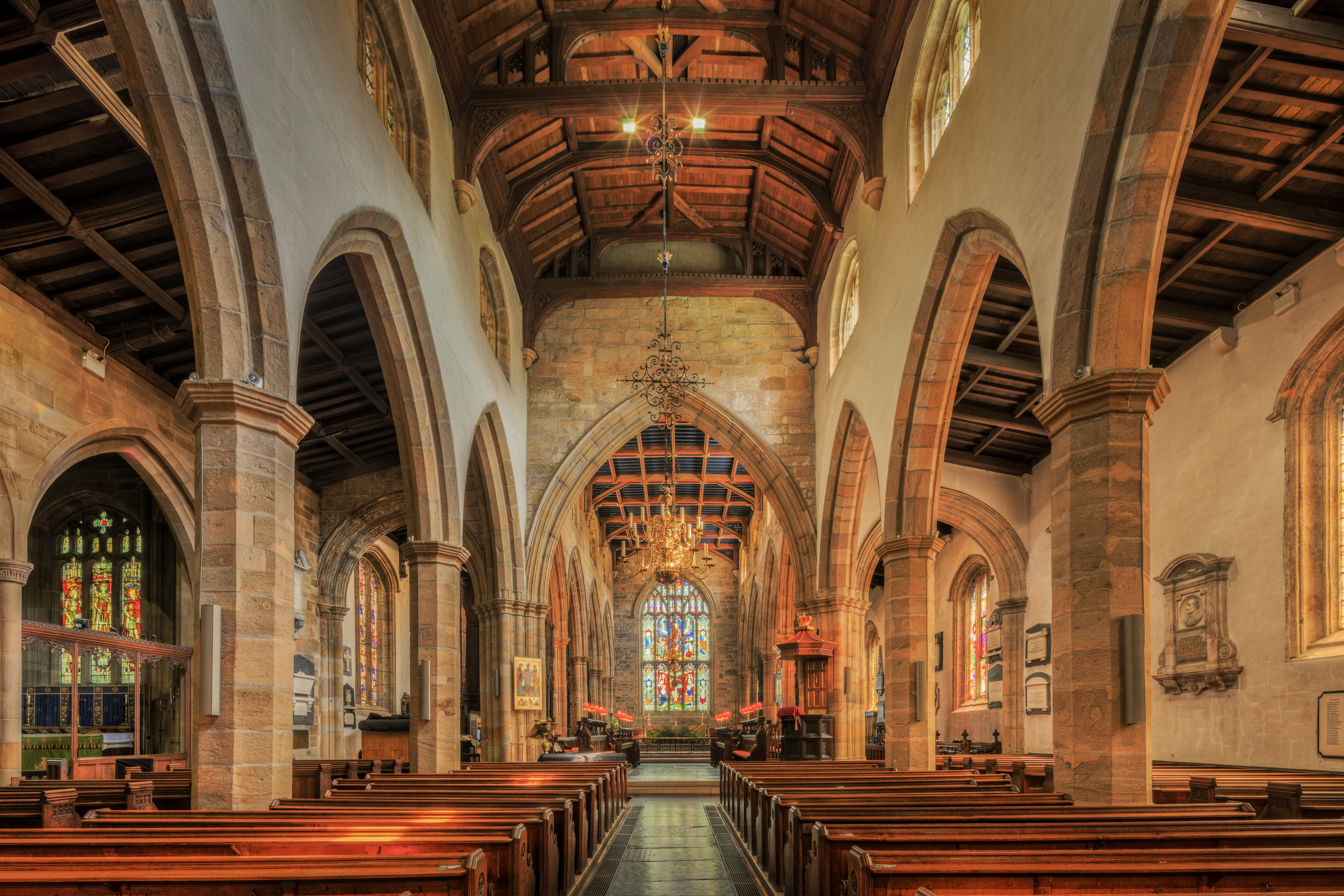
Inside Lancaster Priory

The carved choirstalls are of oak and, dating from 1340, are the third oldest in England. Pevsner states that they are "about the most luxuriant canopies in the country". The seats have misericords, some of which have carvings. At the back of the stalls are modern embroidery panels. The carved pulpit dates from 1619. It was originally a three-decker pulpit with a canopy surmounted by a crown on a Bible. In 1999 the canopy was reinstated, using the original crown. The stone base of the font was installed in 1848 and its carved wooden cover is dated 1631. The three brass chandeliers are dated 1717. The stained glass in the east window was designed by Edward Paley and made by Wailes. The church plate includes four flagons, a chalice and two breadholders dated 1678–79, a small chalice presented in 1728 and a cup dated 1757.

=== Cynibald's cross ===
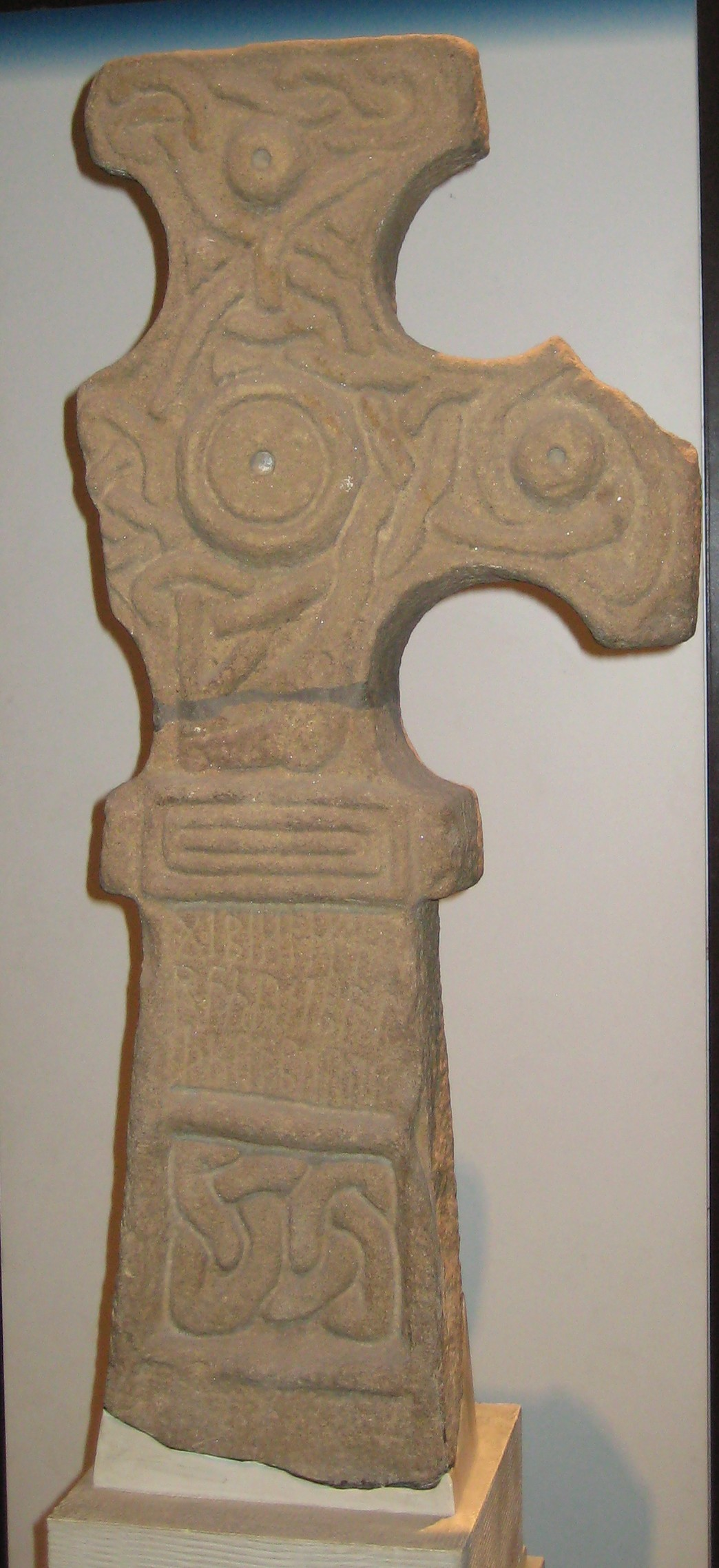
Runic cross found at Lancaster, now in the British Museum

In 1807 a runic cross was found while digging in the churchyard. The cross is 3 feet in length, and 1 foot 9 inches across. The Anglo-Saxon Runic inscription translates to "Pray ye for Cynibald Cuthburuc". Following a meeting of the British Archaeological Association in Lancaster, the cross was moved to the British Museum in 1868. A replica of the cross is now on display near the south west door of the priory.

=== External features ===
In the churchyard is a sandstone sundial dating from the late 18th century which was restored in 1894 and which is listed at Grade II. Also in the churchyard and listed at Grade II are the Rawlinson memorial dating from the late 18th century, and a tomb chest with a damaged marble effigy dating from the mid 19th century. The ground under and around the church is also a scheduled monument.

== Burials ==
The mummified hand that presumably belonged to Frances "Fanny" Elizabeth Johnson, a slave from St Kitts, was interred in the Priory's memorial garden in 1997. Fanny was born brought to England in 1778 by John Satterthwaite, nephew of slaver Thomas Satterthwaite, to work at his residence Castle Park and was baptised in the church that year. Johnson was likely a personal maid to John's wife, Mary (née Rawlins).

== Present day ==
The church holds the usual services of an Anglican church, the civic ceremonies of a city's parish church, and regular concerts. The church is open for visitors from 10.00-16:00 Monday-Saturday and for services on Sundays. Lancaster Priory is a member of the Greater Churches Group.

The Royal Society for the Protection of Birds commends the priory as a location for viewing the aerobatics of the local swift flocks.

== See also ==
- Grade I listed buildings in Lancashire
- Grade I listed churches in Lancashire
- Listed buildings in Lancaster, Lancashire
- List of ecclesiastical works by Paley and Austin
- Scheduled monuments in Lancashire
