= St Thomas' Church, Lancaster =

Coordinates: 54.0461°N 2.7994°W

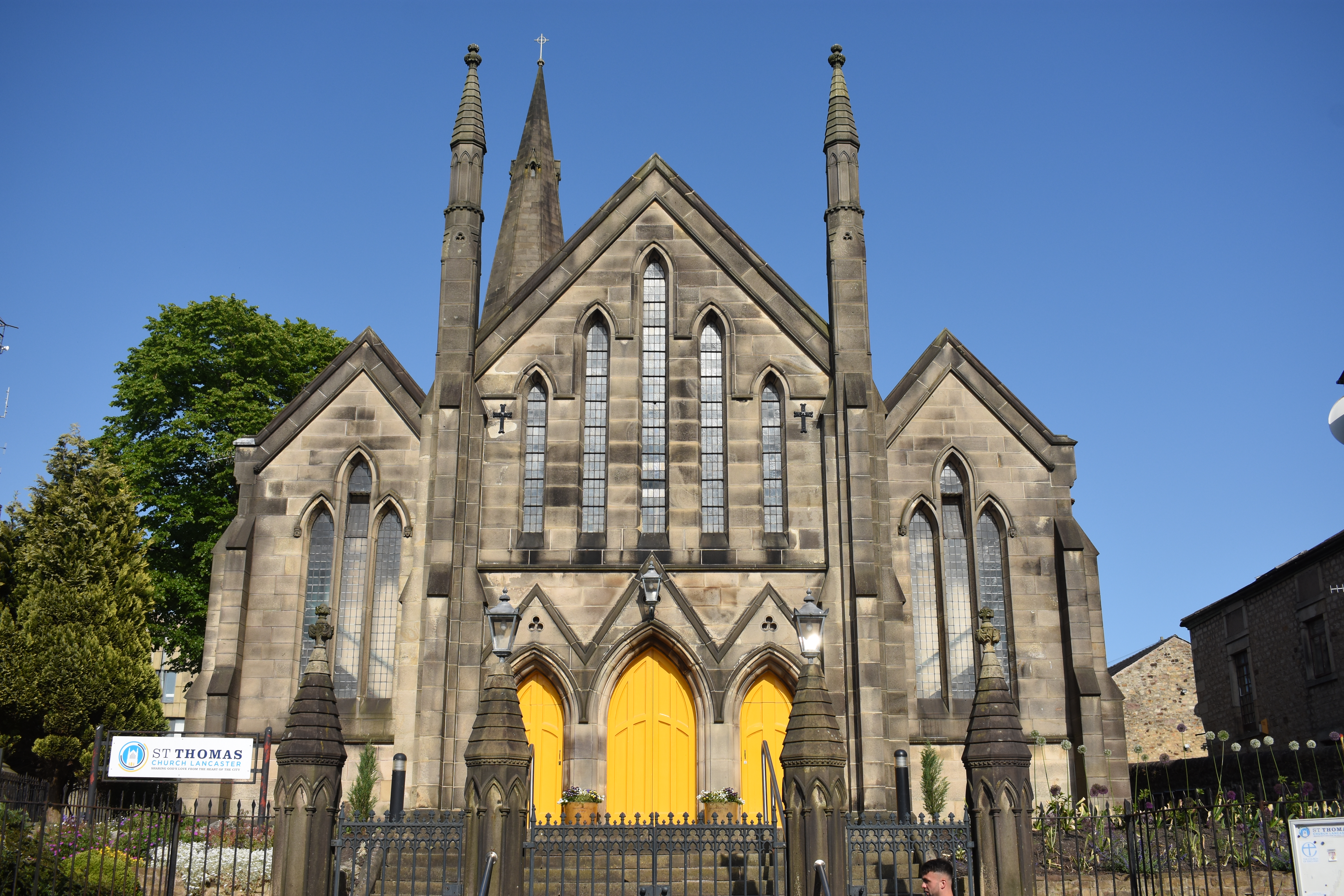
- St Thomas' Church, Lancaster

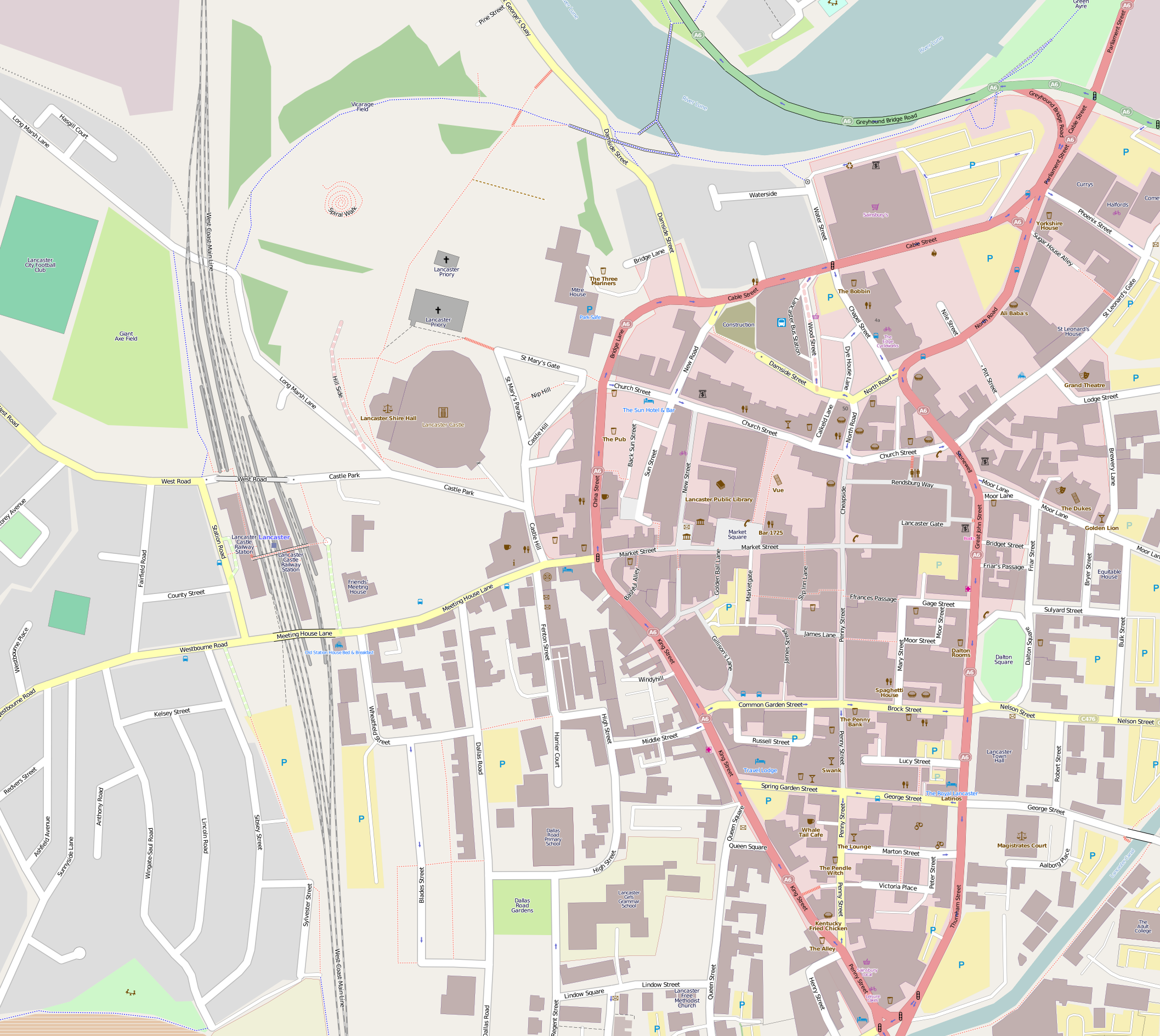
- Location in Lancaster
- OS grid reference: SD 477,614
- Location: Marton Street, Lancaster, Lancashire
- Country: England
- Denomination: Anglican
- Churchmanship: Charismatic evangelical
- Website: www.st.tees.org.uk

History
- Status: Parish church
- Founded: 3 March 1840
- Dedication: St Thomas
- Consecrated: 14 June 1841

Architecture
- Functional status: Active
- Heritage designation: Grade II
- Designated: 13 March 1995
- Architect(s): Edmund Sharpe, E. G. Paley
- Architectural type: Church
- Style: Gothic Revival
- Groundbreaking: 1840
- Completed: 1853

Specifications
- Materials: Sandstone, slate roofs

Administration
- Province: York
- Diocese: Blackburn
- Archdeaconry: Lancaster
- Deanery: Lancaster
- Parish: St Thomas, Lancaster

Clergy
- Vicar: The Revd Mark Bradford

St Thomas' Church is in Marton Street, Lancaster, Lancashire, England. It is an active Anglican parish church in the deanery of Lancaster, the archdeaconry of Lancaster and the diocese of Blackburn. The church is recorded in the National Heritage List for England as a designated Grade II listed building.

== History ==
St Thomas' was built between 1840 and 1841 to a design by the local architect Edmund Sharpe. One of the subscribers to the church was Queen Victoria who, as Duchess of Lancaster, contributed £150 (equivalent to £13,200 in 2025). The land was given by George Marton of Capernwray Hall, and Elizabeth Salisbury made an endowment of £1,100. As originally planned, the church was intended to seat 1,100 people. The foundation stone was laid on 3 March 1840, the church opened for worship on 14 April 1841, and it was consecrated on 14 June by Rt Revd John Bird Sumner, Bishop of Chester. In 1852–53 Sharpe's successor, E. G. Paley, added the northeast steeple and the chancel in a similar architectural style.

The first vicar was the Revd. Joseph North Green-Armytage, from 1841 to 1845, whose inspirational sermons and capacity congregations had, according to his several obituaries, inspired the building of the Church. He was succeeded by Rev Colin Campbell, serving for 11 years. Campbell invested much of his own money into the church, including building the spire, installing an organ and building a church school behind the church. He was succeeded by his son, also Colin, in 1858.

=== Present day ===
In the present day, St Thomas' Church stands in the charismatic evangelical tradition of the Church of England. It is a member of the Evangelical Alliance and the New Wine network.

== Architecture ==
=== Exterior ===
The authors of the Buildings of England series state that the church has "a grand approach up steps with imposing gatepiers". It is constructed in sandstone ashlar with slate roofs in Early English style. Its plan consists of a six-bay nave with north and south aisles under three gabled roofs; the nave is extended one bay to the west to form a narthex. At the east end is a two-bay chancel with a steeple in the angle between the north aisle and the chancel. The lower part of the steeple has two square stages, with buttresses and a stair turret. Above the level of the aisle it becomes octagonal with louvred bell openings. The spire is also octagonal, with two tiers of lucarnes, a finial and an iron cross. A plain parapet runs along the tops of the eaves and gables. In the west front are five tall stepped lancet windows under which is a triple doorway. On each side of the front are buttresses that rise up to turrets with finials. There are more lancet windows around the church, with a triple lancet at the east end.

=== Interior ===
Inside the church are galleries on three sides supported by cast iron columns. A brass dated 1881 was produced by Shrigley and Hunt. The arms of Queen Victoria are on the west gallery. The stained glass in the east window is by William Warrington, and the tiles on the chancel floor and in the reredos are by Mintons. The pulpit and other furnishings are by James Rattee of Cambridge, and the organ case was made by James Hatch. The three-manual pipe organ was built in 1852 by John Banfield, rebuilt in the 1880s by Richard Tubbs and, between 1920 and 1940, was rebuilt again and moved to its present position at the northeast of the nave by Jardine and Company.

== See also ==
- Listed buildings in Lancaster, Lancashire
- List of architectural works by Edmund Sharpe
- List of works by Sharpe and Paley
