= Listed buildings in Lancaster, Lancashire =

The listed buildings in Lancaster, Lancashire (the unparished area within the wider City of Lancaster district), are divided into:

- Listed buildings in Lancaster, Lancashire (central area)
- Listed buildings in Lancaster, Lancashire (outer areas)
