= John Jackson (cricketer, born 1841) =

English cricketer

John Wilson Jackson (21 May 1841 – 29 August 1906) was an English cricketer who played for Lancashire. He was born in Lancaster and died in Birmingham.

Jackson made a single first-class appearance, in a game against Yorkshire in 1867, a game for which Lancashire, struggling to put a team together, fielded five new players.

Jackson's brother, Edward, made fifteen first-class appearances for Lancashire.
