= Jay Diggins =

English singer-songwriter (born 1974)

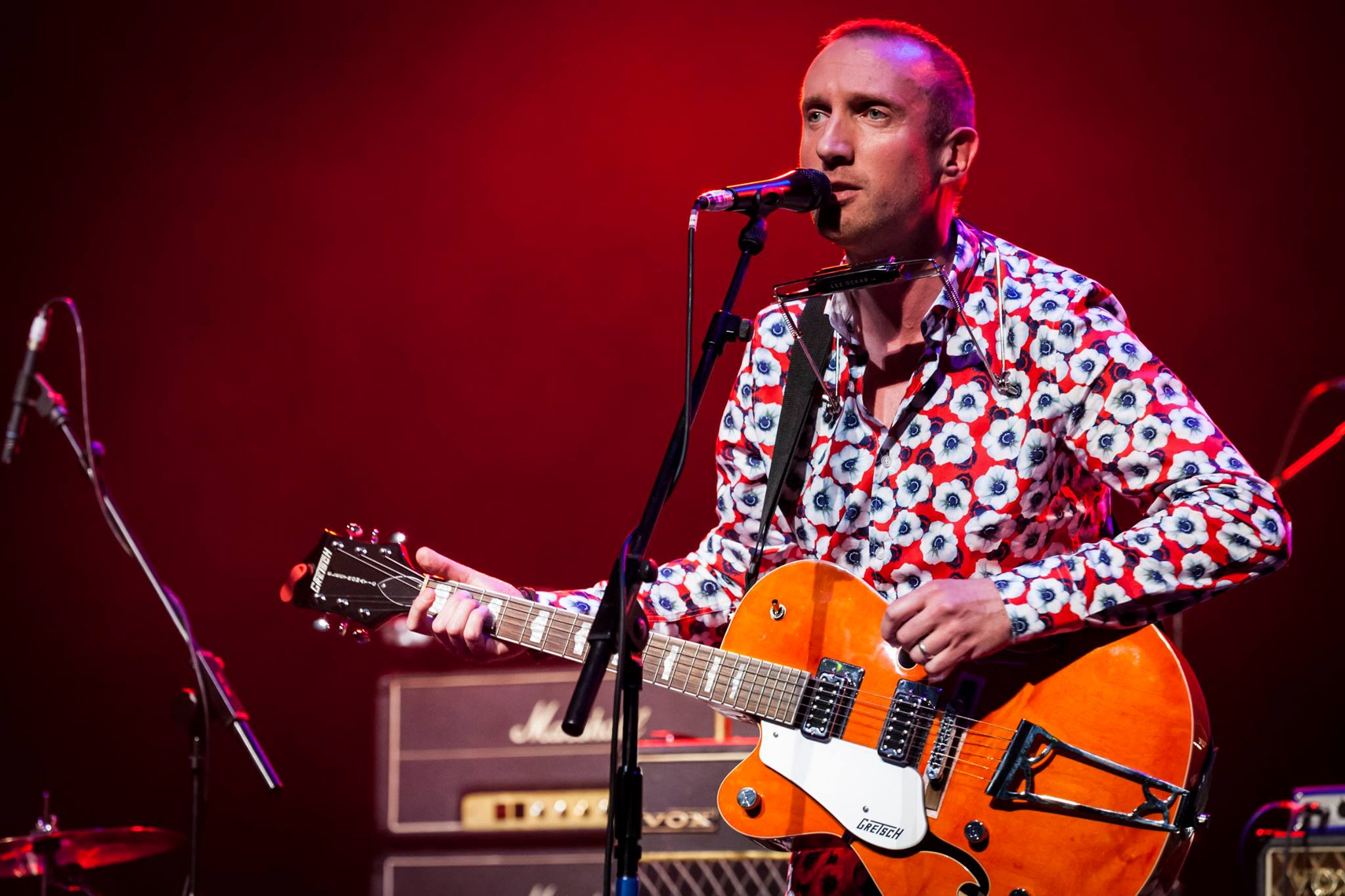
- Diggins performing in August 2014

Background information
- Born: 17 September 1974 (age 51); Newark, Nottinghamshire, England
- Origin: Lancaster, Lancashire, England
- Genres: Alternative rock, folk rock, art rock
- Occupations: Singer songwriter, musician, producer
- Instruments: Voice, guitar, harmonica, bass, drums, organ, percussion
- Years active: 2011–present
- Labels: Ditto Music, Wyre Bank Records
- Website: jaydiggins.com

Jay Diggins (born 17 September 1974) is an English singer-songwriter. He is best known for his work with John Parish and for turning down an opportunity to appear on the hit BBC One show The Voice. Height: 6’2

== Career ==
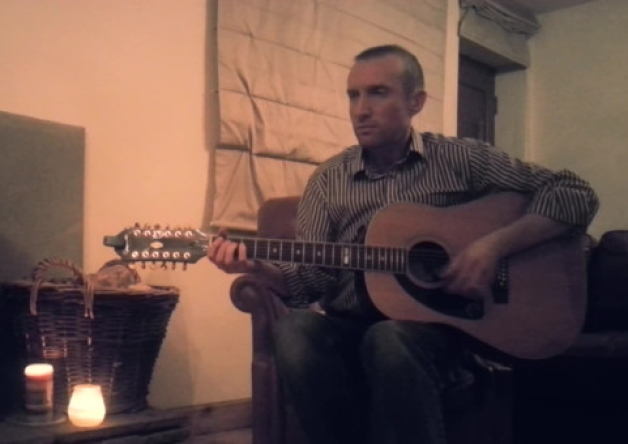
Diggins playing a 12-string acoustic guitar

He was taught how to perform in a band, by well-known music producer John Parish, in Yeovil, Somerset. He then spent two years learning how to record rock music at Parish's studios along with well-known English musician PJ Harvey. He won a place on the world's first Popular Music Sound Recording course at Salford University. More than 200 times over-subscribed, the course was tutored by record producer Bill Leader. In 2011, he designed and built Wyrebank Studios.

In May 2013 he recorded "Fall From Grace" and "Ain't No", with John Parish at Toybox Studios in Bristol. The recordings were published online and this led to his music being discovered by BBC programme The Voice. Diggins turned down an offer to appear on the show, however.

The two tracks received critical acclaim, with independent radio play and numerous full page reviews in the Lancaster Guardian, Garstang Courier, Lancashire Evening Post. Diggins was special guest and performed a live acoustic set on 94.4 Salford City Radio, before performing on the UK festival circuit.

Diggins' debut album Searching was released on 20 September 2013, with a sold-out album launch at the Grand Theatre, Lancaster. The album was recorded at two separate studios: at ToyBox Studios in Bristol, in May 2013, for the tracks "Fall From Grace" and "Ain't No", featuring Diggins with John Parish and at Wyrebank Studios for tracks "At Your Expense" and "She Longs for Yesterday", on which Diggins played a prototype Vox Continental organ, the only one known to be still in existence. Diggins used the same Vistalite Drums kit, that Michael Lee had used for the Jimmy Page and Robert Plant reunion tour. The album mastering was by John Dent and Jason Mitchell, who are noted for their work with Bob Marley. Reviewing the album for The Lancaster Guardian, Nick Lakin said, "It is an album greater than the sum of its parts, a rare find these days, and it's perhaps a shame that some of the tracks didn't last longer... Either way it is an accomplished piece of work, with a lot of depth and high production value, the drums, for me, standing out in particular."

In 2014 Diggins returned to the Grand Theatre, Lancaster, and also performed at some large theatres supporting The Beautiful South at the Lyceum Theatre in Crewe and with Bruce Foxton's From The Jam at Buxton Opera House.

During 2015, Diggins toured the UK with Mark Morriss of The Bluetones.

== External References ==
- jaydiggins.com: official website
- Jay Diggins at bbc.co.uk
