= Friends Meeting House, Lancaster =

Friends meeting house in Lancaster, England

Coordinates: 54.0484°N 2.8065°W

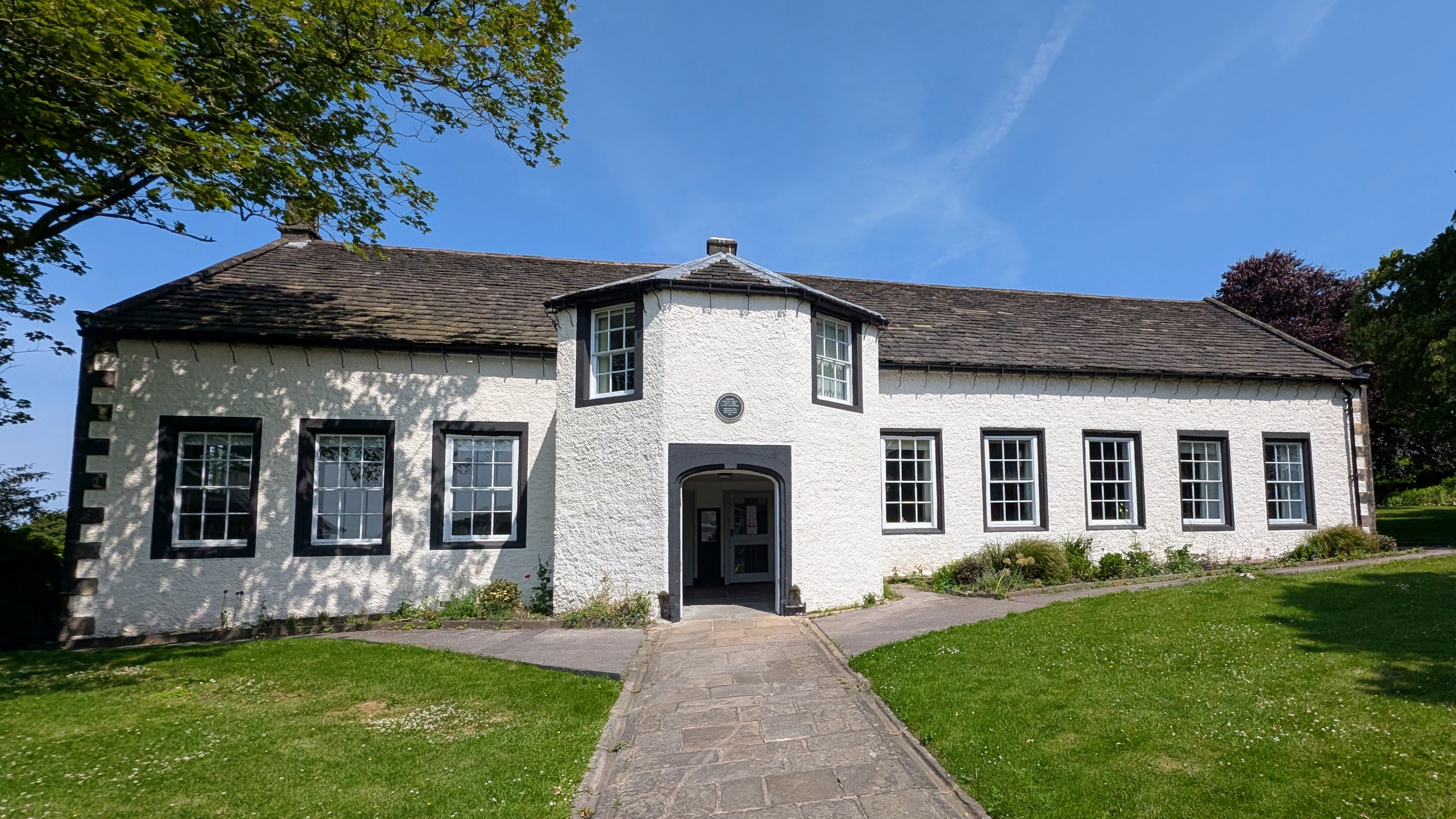
Seen in 2025

The Friends Meeting House in Lancaster, Lancashire, England is a Quaker meeting house built in 1708. It is an active Friends meeting house, and a Grade II* listed building.

The earliest meeting house on the site was built in 1667, and its date stone survives in the current building.
