= Lancaster, Lancashire =

City in Lancashire, England

Coordinates: 54°02′56″N 02°48′05″W

Lancaster
- City
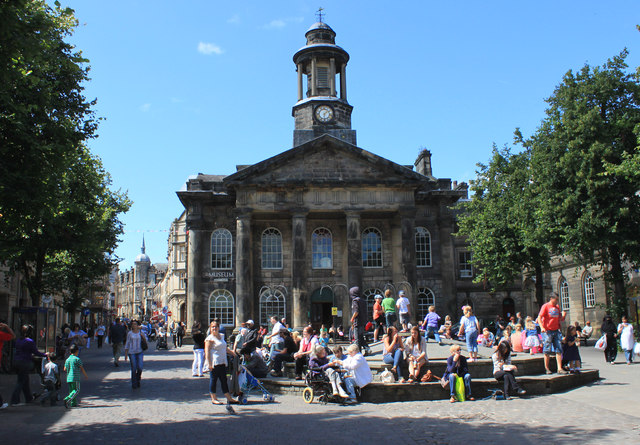
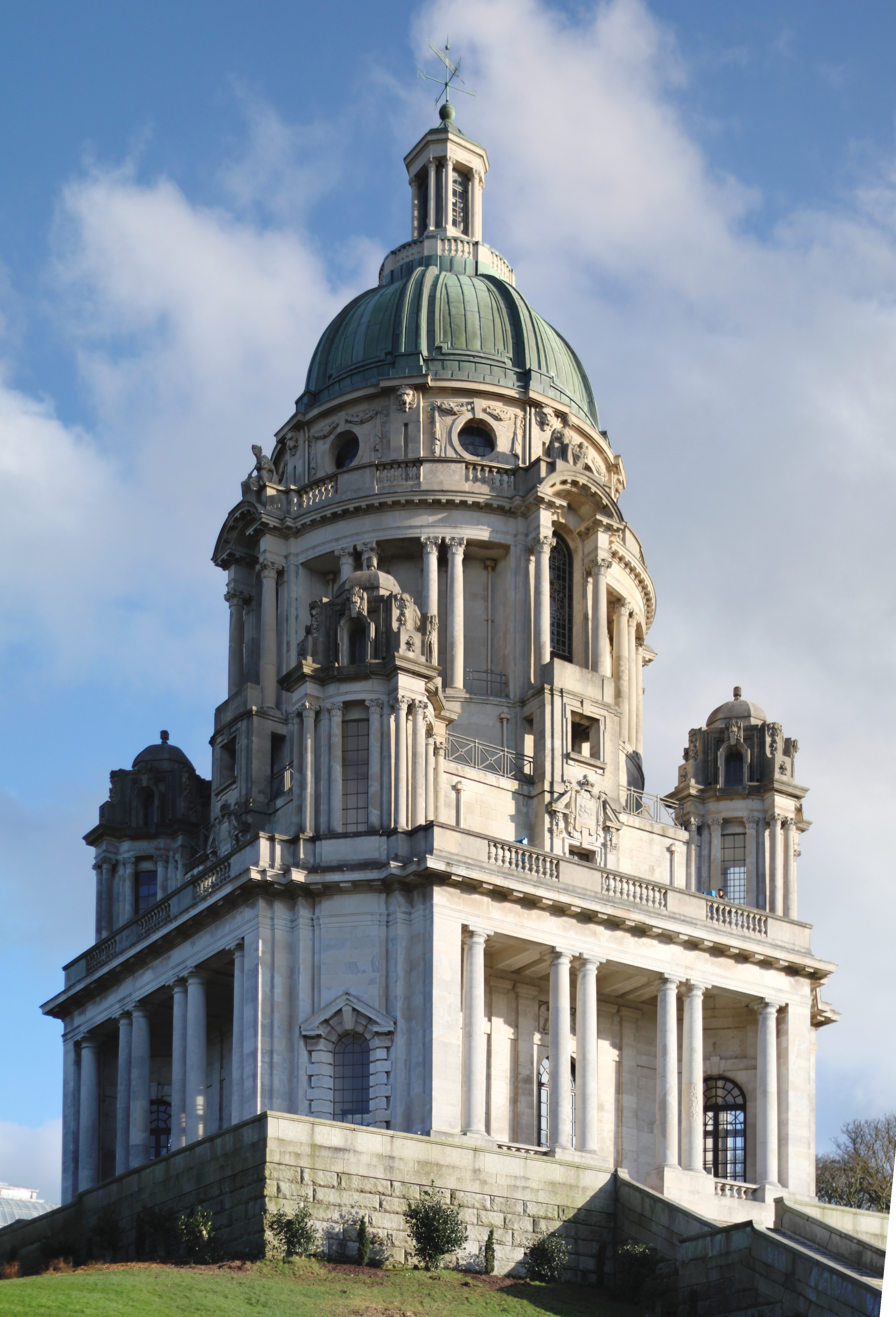
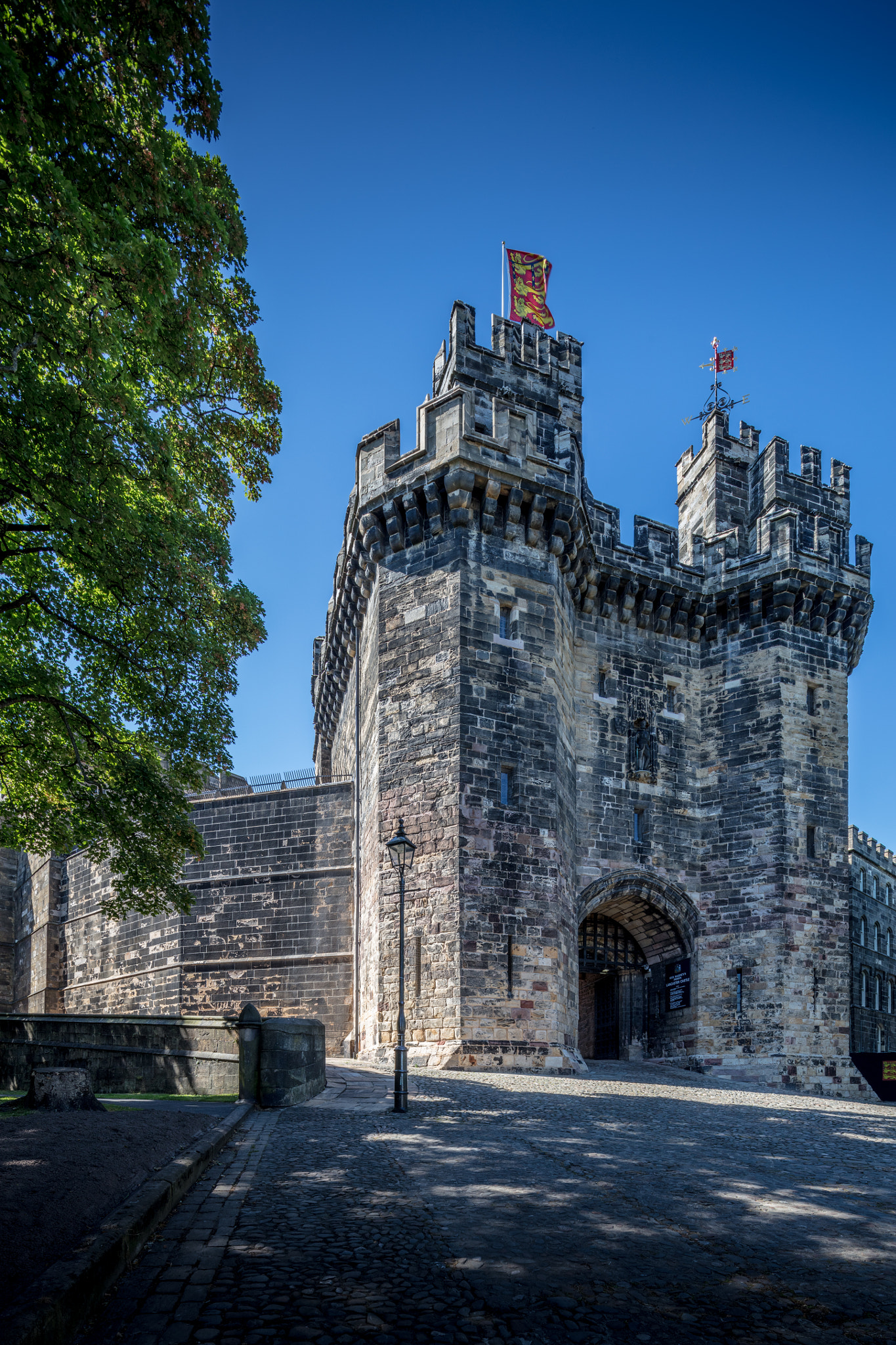
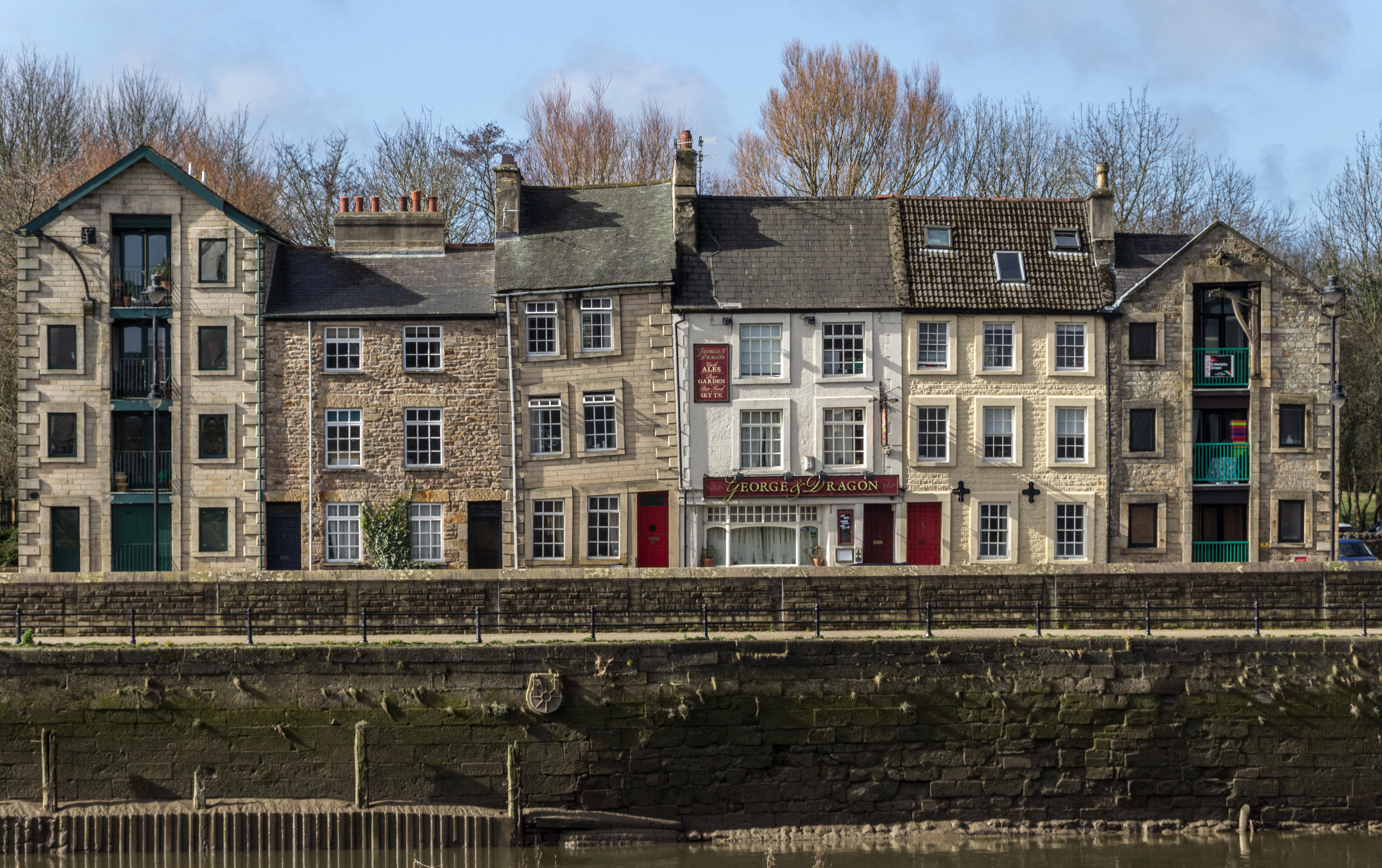
- Market Square Ashton Memorial Lancaster Castle St George’s Quay

- Shown within the City of Lancaster district Location within Lancashire
- Population: 52,660 (2021)
- Demonym: Lancastrian
- OS grid reference: SD475615
- District: City of Lancaster
- Shire county: Lancashire
- Region: North West
- Country: England
- Sovereign state: United Kingdom
- Post town: Lancaster
- Postcode district: LA1, LA2
- Dialling code: 01524
- Police: Lancashire
- Fire: Lancashire
- Ambulance: North West
- UK Parliament: Lancaster and Wyre

Lancaster (/ˈlæŋkəstər/ LANG-kə-stər or /ˈlæŋkæstər/ LANG-kast-ər) is a city in Lancashire, England, and the main cultural, economic and commercial centre of City of Lancaster district. The city is on the River Lune, directly inland from Morecambe Bay. Lancaster is the county town, although Lancashire County Council has been based at County Hall in Preston since its formation in 1889.

The city's long history is marked by Lancaster Roman Fort, Lancaster Castle, Lancaster Priory Church, Lancaster Cathedral and the Ashton Memorial. It is the seat of Lancaster University and has a campus of the University of Cumbria. It had a population of 52,660 in the 2021 census, compared to the district, which had a population of 142,931.

The House of Lancaster was a branch of the English royal family. The Duchy of Lancaster still holds large estates on behalf of Charles III, who is the Duke of Lancaster. The Port of Lancaster and the 18th-century Lancaster slave trade played a major role in the city's growth, but for many years the outport of Glasson Dock, downstream, has been the main shipping facility.

== History ==
=== Toponymy ===
Lancaster was recorded in the Domesday Book of 1086, as Loncastre, where "Lon" refers to the River Lune and "castre" from the Old English cæster and Latin castrum for "fort" to the Roman fort that stood on the site.

=== Roman and Saxon eras ===
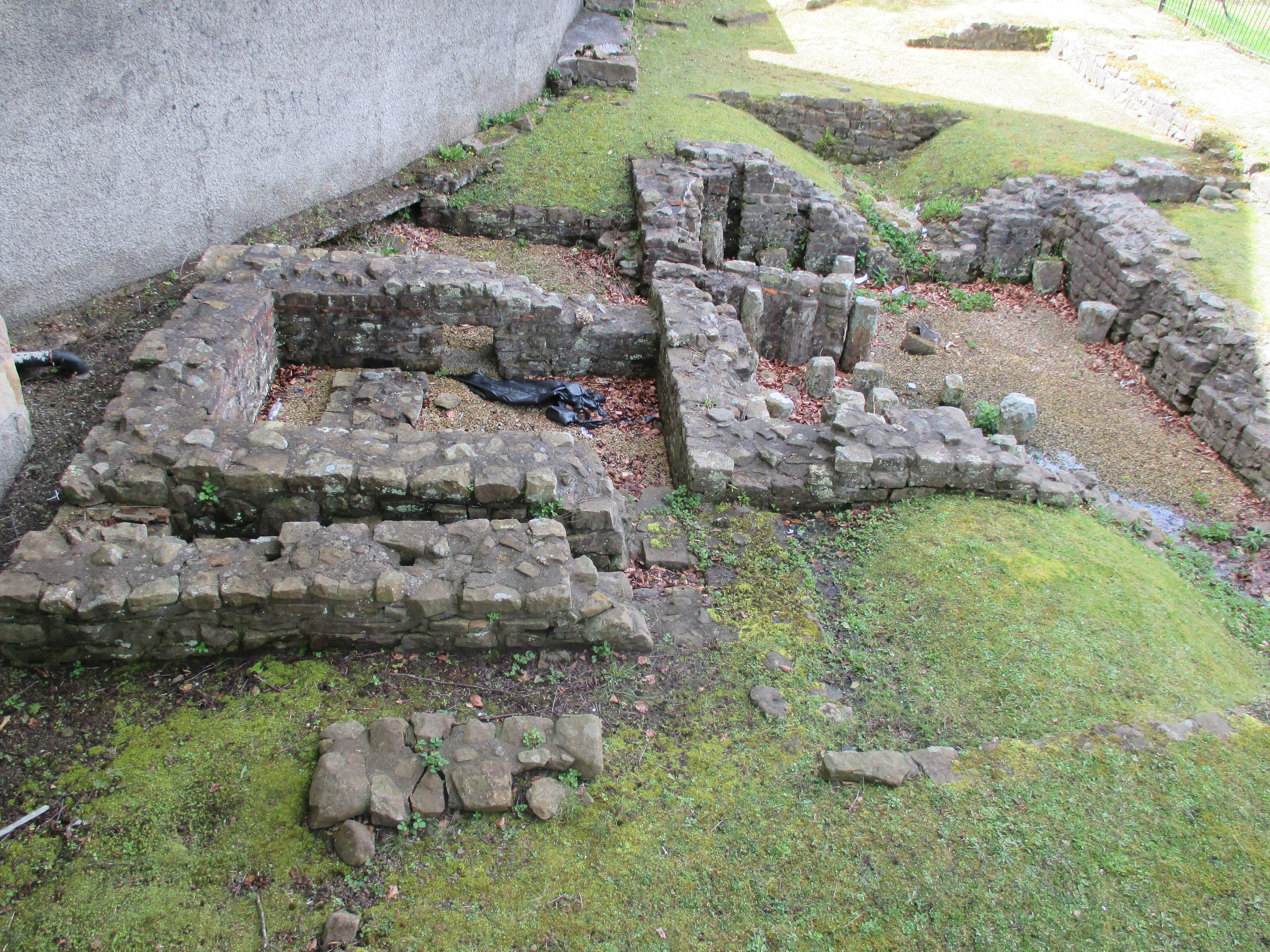
Roman bath house on Castle Hill

A Roman fort was built by the end of the 1st century CE on the hill where Lancaster Castle now stands, possibly as early as the 60s, based on Roman coin evidence. Coin evidence also suggests that the fort was not continuously inhabited in its early years. It was rebuilt in stone about 102. The fort name is known only in a shortened form; the only evidence is a Roman milestone found 4 miles (6.4 km) outside Lancaster, with an inscription ending L MP IIII, meaning "from L – 4 miles, and that its name began with an L.

Roman baths were found in 1812 and can be seen near the junction of Bridge Lane and Church Street. There was presumably a bath-house with the 4th-century fort. The Roman baths incorporated a reused inscription of the Gallic Emperor Postumus, dating from 262 to 266. The 3rd-century fort was garrisoned by the ala Sebosiana and numerus Barcariorum Tigrisiensium.

The ancient Wery Wall was identified in 1950 as the north wall of the 4th-century fort, which was a drastic remodelling of the 3rd-century one, while retaining the same orientation. The later fort is the only example in north-west Britain of a 4th-century type, with massive curtain-wall and projecting bastions typical of the Saxon Shore or Wales. Extension of the technique as far north as Lancaster shows that the coast between Cumberland and North Wales was not left defenceless after the west-coast attacks and the disaster in the Carausian Revolt of 296, which followed from those under Albinus in 197.

The fort at its largest extent covered 9–10 acres (4–4 ha). Evidence suggests that it stayed in use until the end of Roman occupation of Britain. Church Street and some of St Leonard's Gate probably mark the initial course of the Roman road up the valley to the fort at Over Burrow.

Little is known of Lancaster from the end of Roman rule in the early 5th century to the Norman Conquest of the late 11th century. Despite a lack of documentation for the period, it is thought that Lancaster remained inhabited. It lay on the fringes of the kingdoms of Mercia and Northumbria and over time may have passed from one to the other. Archaeological evidence suggests there was a monastery on or near the site of today's Lancaster Priory by the 700s or 800s. The Anglo-Saxon runic "Cynibald's cross" found at the Priory in 1807 is thought to date from the late 9th century. Lancaster was probably one of several abbeys founded under Wilfrid.

=== Medieval ===
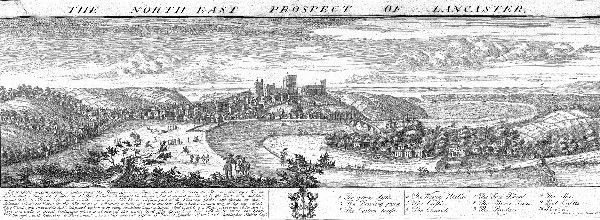
Lancaster in 1728

After the Norman conquest of England in 1066, Lancaster fell under the control of William I, as stated in the Domesday Book of 1086, which has the earliest known mention of Lancaster as such in any document. The founding Priory charter dated 1094 is the first known document specific to Lancaster. By this time William had passed Lancaster and its surroundings to Roger de Poitou. The document also suggests the monastery was refounded as a parish church some time before 1066.

Lancaster became a borough in 1193 under King Richard I. Its first charter, dated 12 June 1193, was from John, Count of Mortain, who later became King of England.

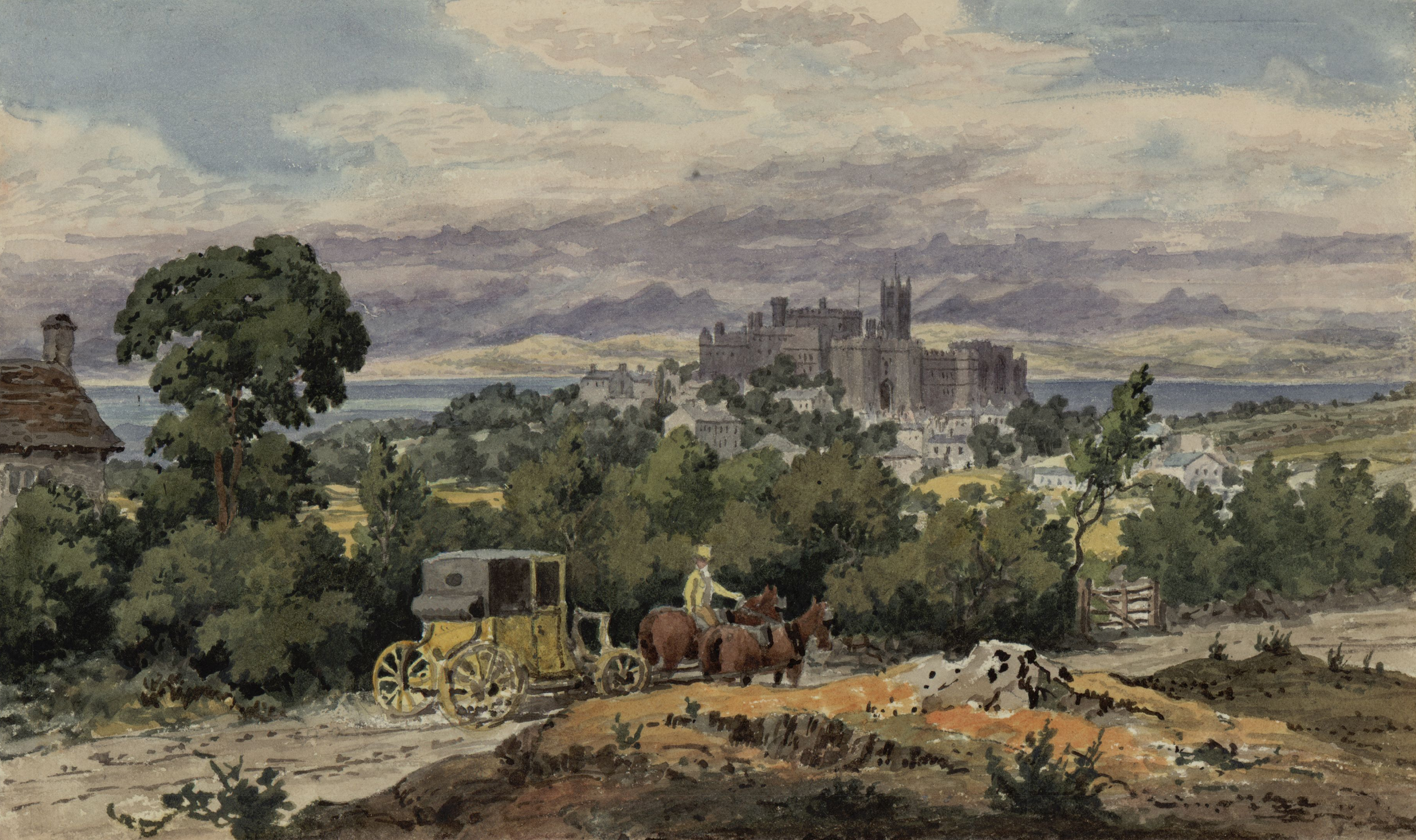
Lancaster from the south in 1825

Lancaster Castle, partly built in the 13th century and enlarged by Elizabeth I, stands on the site of a Roman garrison. During The Great Raid of 1322, damage was done to the castle by Robert the Bruce, though it resisted the attack and was restored and strengthened by John of Gaunt, 1st Duke of Lancaster, who added much of the Gateway Tower and a turret on the keep or Lungess Tower, which has been named "John o' Gaunt's Chair". In 1322 the Scots burnt the town. It was rebuilt but removed from its position on the hill to the slope and foot. Again in 1389, after the Battle of Otterburn, it was destroyed by the Scots. Lancaster Castle is known as the site of the Pendle witch trials in 1612. It was said that the court based in the castle (the Lancaster Assizes) sentenced more people to be hanged than any other in the country outside London, earning Lancaster the nickname, "the Hanging Town". It also figured prominently in the suppression of Catholicism during the Reformation – at least eleven Catholic priests were executed and a memorial to them as the Lancaster Martyrs stands by the city centre.

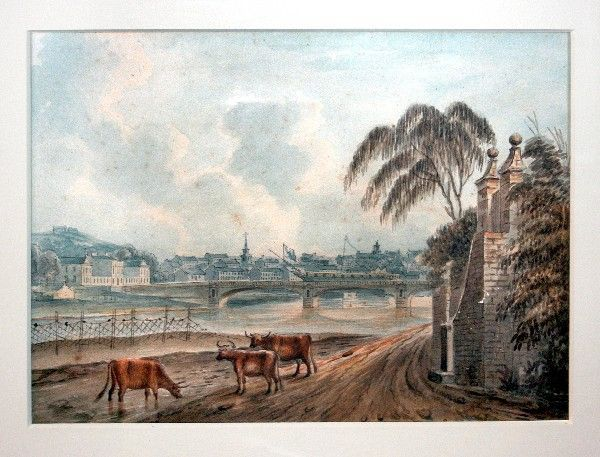
Lancaster in the 19th century

The traditional emblem of the House of Lancaster is the Red Rose of Lancaster, similar to that of the House of York with a white rose. The names derive from emblems of the Royal Duchies of Lancaster and York in the 15th century. This erupted into a civil war over rival claims to the throne during the Wars of the Roses.

More recently the term "Wars of the Roses" has been applied to rivalry in sports between teams from Lancashire and Yorkshire. It is also applied to the annual Roses Tournament between Lancaster and York universities.

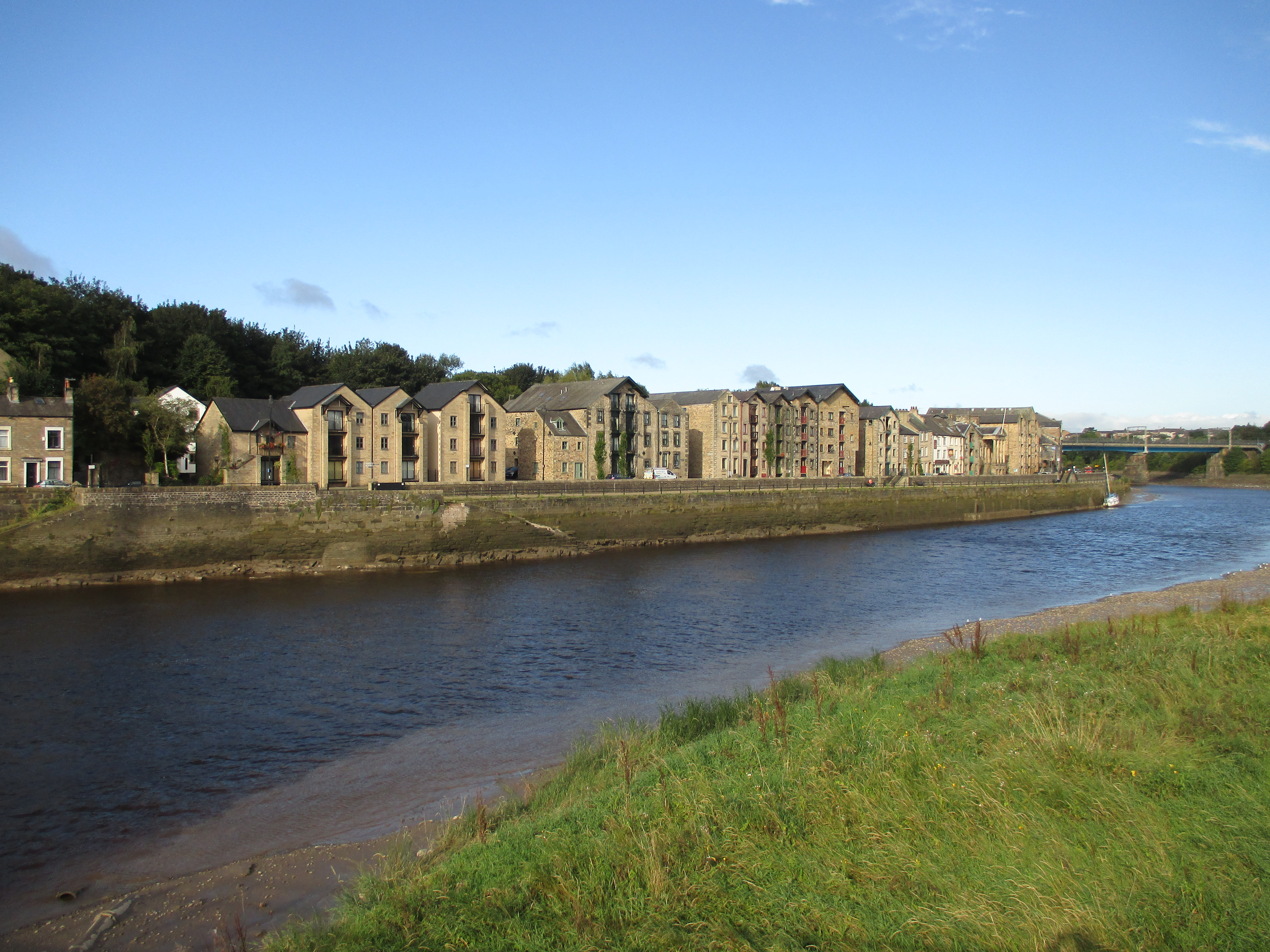
St George's Quay

Lancaster gained a first charter in 1193 as a market town and borough, but had to await city status until 1937.

=== 18th-century port ===
In 1700, the population of Lancaster was around 5,000. Many of the city's central buildings, including those lining St George's Quay date from the 18th century, as the Port of Lancaster became one of the UK's busiest and the Lancaster slave trade was the fourth largest in the UK slave trade. Among prominent Lancaster slavers were Dodshon Foster, Thomas Hinde and his namesake son. The last slave ship to be constructed in Lancaster was the 267-tonne Trafalgar, built in 1806 at Brockbank’s shipyard for Samuel Hinderland and William Hinde. Lancaster's role as a major port diminished as the river began to silt up and Morecambe, Glasson Dock and Sunderland Point became preeminent for brief periods. Heysham Port has now eclipsed all others on the Lune.

=== Recent history ===
A permanent military presence was built up with the completion of Bowerham Barracks in 1880. The Phoenix Street drill hall was completed in 1894.

Since the Industrial Revolution, the city was home to many industries from the 18th century to the 20th century. The main industries in the city at the time were candle making, sailcloth making, rope making and shipbuilding. Since the decline of the industrial revolution, Lancaster suffered from economic decline and high unemployment rates like many parts of the north of England. The city underwent regeneration and is now a tourist destination.

Lancaster is mainly a service-oriented city. Products include animal feed, textiles, chemicals, livestock, paper, synthetic fibre, farm machinery, HGV trailers and mineral fibres. In recent years, a high-tech sector has emerged from information technology and telecommunications companies investing in the city.

In March 2004, Lancaster was granted Fairtrade City status.

Lancaster was home to the European headquarters of Reebok. After merging with Adidas, Reebok moved to Bolton and Stockport in 2007.

In May 2015, Elizabeth II visited the castle for commemorations for the 750th anniversary of the creation of the Duchy of Lancaster.

== Governance ==
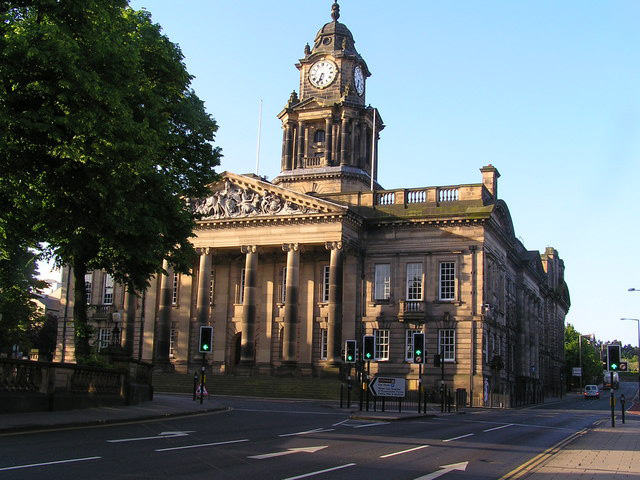
Lancaster Town Hall, Dalton Square

The former City and Municipal Borough of Lancaster and the Municipal Borough of Morecambe and Heysham, along with other authorities, merged in 1974 to form the City of Lancaster district within the shire county of Lancashire. This was given city status and Lancaster City Council became the governing body for the district. Lancaster is an unparished area and has no separate council. It is divided into wards (for elections to Lancaster City Council), such as Bulk, Castle, Ellel, John O'Gaunt (named after John of Gaunt, the 1st Duke of Lancaster), Scotforth East, Scotforth West, Skerton East, Skerton West and University and Scotforth Rural.

For elections to Lancashire County Council, Lancaster is split into the electoral divisions of Lancaster Central (the city centre and an area extending south including Cockerham and Glasson Dock), Lancaster East (south of the River Lune and east of the Lancaster Canal), Lancaster South East (bordered by the River Conder with the University at its southern point) and Skerton (north of the River Lune).

=== Political representation ===
The city lies in the Lancaster and Wyre constituency for elections of Members of Parliament to the House of Commons, represented since 2015 by Cat Smith of the Labour Party (as Lancaster and Fleetwood constituency before 2024).

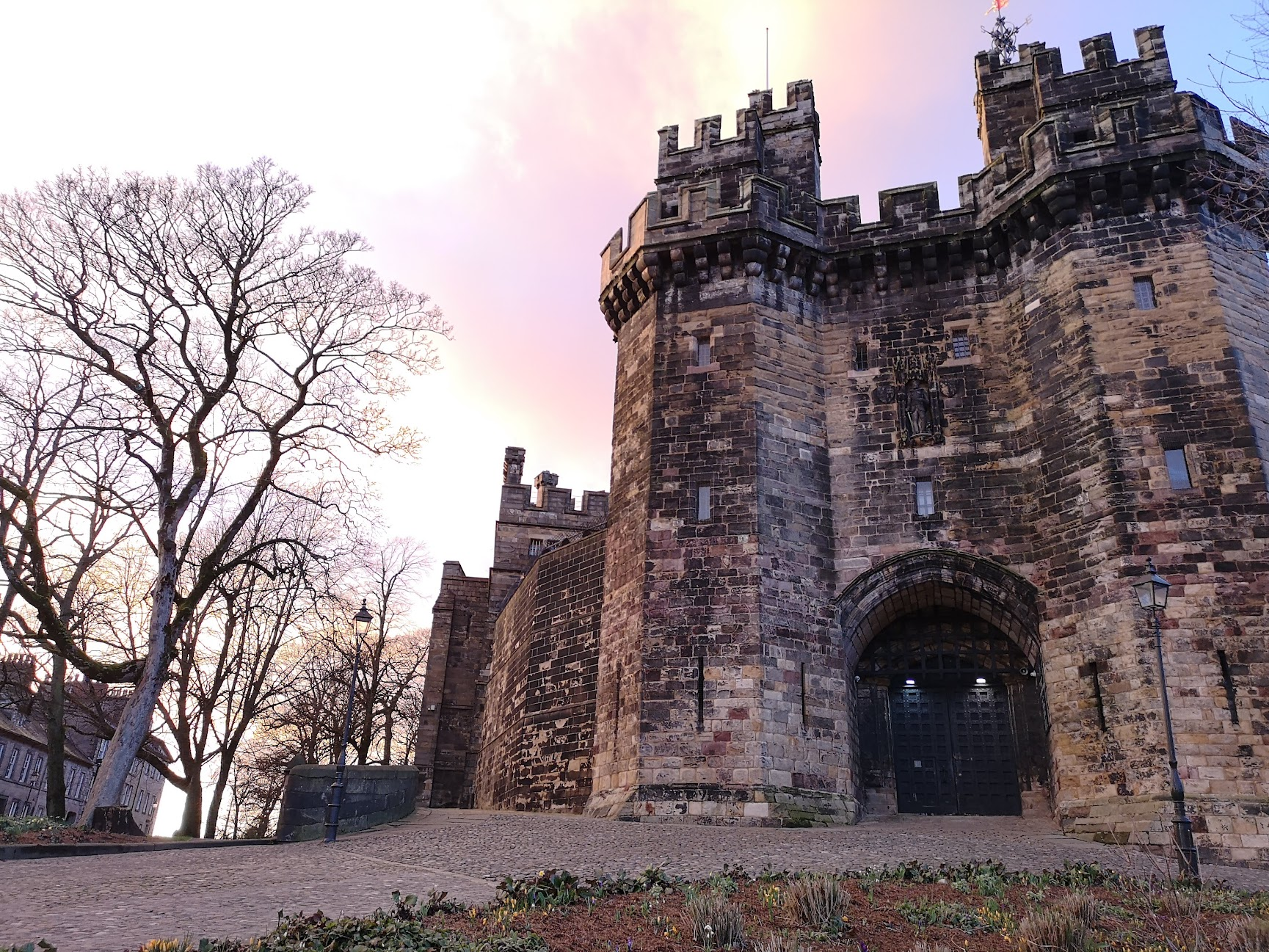
Lancaster castle in the evening

Since the 2023 Lancaster City Council election, Labour have been the largest party on the city council, but not in overall control, with 24 of the 61 seats.

Since the 2025 Lancashire County Council election, Lancaster East, Lancaster South East and Lancaster Central have been represented by The Green Party, while Skerton is represented by Reform UK.

== Geography ==
Lancaster is Lancashire's northernmost city, three miles (4.8 km) inland from Morecambe Bay. It is on the River Lune (from which comes its name), and the Lancaster Canal. It becomes hillier from the Lune Valley eastwards, with Williamson Hill in the north-west a notable height at 109 m (358 ft) and recognised as a TuMP: a hill with "thirty and upwards metres prominence". The central area of the city can be roughly defined by the railway to the west, the canal to the south and east, and the river to the north.

=== Built-up area ===
Lancaster, Morecambe and Heysham have been identified by the Office for National Statistics as forming the Lancaster/Morecambe Built-up area, with a population of 101,911 in the 2021 census. Within this, ONS identifies a Lancaster built-up area sub division with a 2021 population of 52,660.

=== Green belt ===
There is a small portion of green belt on the northern fringe of Lancaster, covering the area into Carnforth and helping to prevent further urban expansion towards nearby Morecambe, Hest Bank, Slyne and Bolton-le-Sands.

== Transport ==
=== Road ===
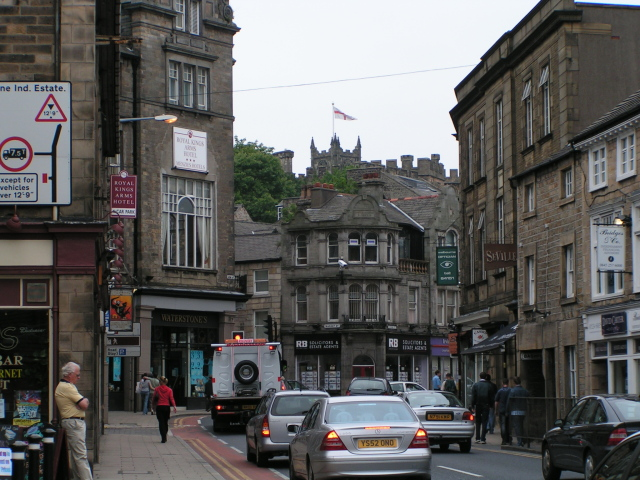
King Street, with the castle in the background

The A6 road, one of the main historic north–south roads in England, passes through the city centre, with northbound and southbound traffic on separate streets, and crosses the Lune at Greyhound Bridge northbound and Skerton Bridge southbound (these are the two furthest-downstream road crossing points of the Lune). The road leads south to Preston, Chorley and Manchester and north to Carnforth, Kendal, Penrith and Carlisle.

The M6 motorway passes to the east of Lancaster with junctions 33 and 34 to the south and north. The Bay Gateway, a dual carriageway opened in 2016, links Heysham to the M6.

==== Bus ====
Lancaster's main bus operator, Stagecoach Cumbria and North Lancashire, operates network of services from Lancaster bus station throughout the Lancaster District and services to more distant places such as Kendal, Keswick, Preston and Blackpool. There are also buses to Lancaster University. Other routes are covered by Kirkby Lonsdale Coach Hire.

=== Rail ===
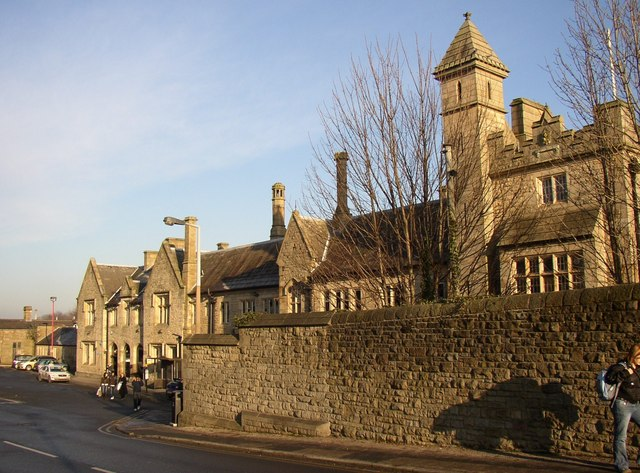
Lancaster railway station

Railway station
Site of former railway station

Lancaster is served by the West Coast Main Line from Lancaster railway station. The station was formerly named Lancaster Castle, to differentiate it from Lancaster Green Ayre on the Leeds–Morecambe line, which closed in 1966. There are train services to and from London, Glasgow, Edinburgh, Birmingham, Manchester, Leeds and Barrow-in-Furness, Windermere, Liverpool and a local service to Morecambe.

The station is served by Avanti West Coast, TransPennine Express and Northern, and is managed by Avanti West Coast.

The city council aims to open a railway station serving the university and south Lancaster, although this is not feasible in the short or medium term with current levels of demand. The Caton–Morecambe section of the former North Western railway is now used as a cycle path.

=== Water and air ===
The Port of Lancaster gained importance in the 18th century. In 1750 the Lancaster Port Commission was established to develop the port. However, in more recent years, shipping visits Glasson Dock, where the Port commission is now based. Heysham Port, about 5 miles (8.0 km) west of Lancaster, is used by ferry services to the Isle of Man, Northern Ireland and Ireland.

The Lancaster Canal and River Lune pass through the city.

The nearest airports are Manchester and Liverpool.

=== Cycling ===
In 2005, Lancaster was one of six English towns chosen to be cycling demonstration towns to promote cycling as a means of transport. Lancaster has cycle routes to many nearby places, many are off-road using disused railways or canal towpaths.

== Landmarks ==
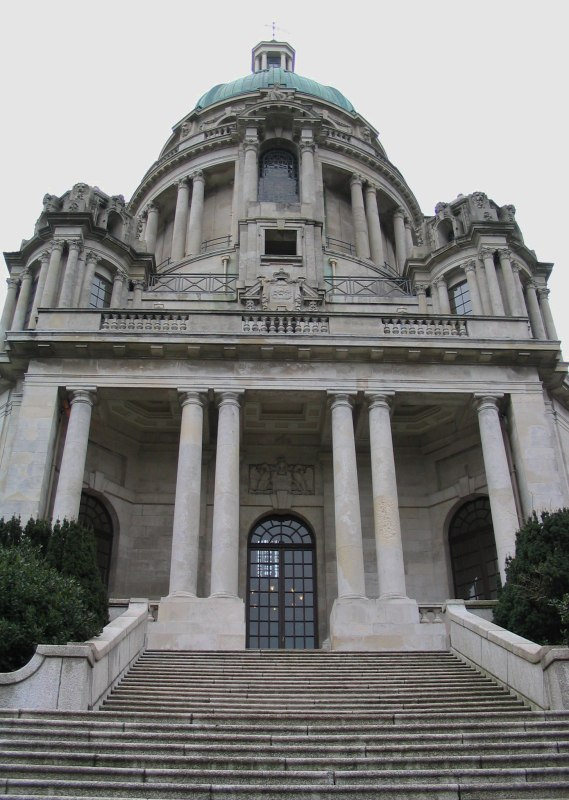
Ashton Memorial, Williamson Park

- Ashton Memorial
- The Dukes
- Custom House (Maritime Museum)
- Grand Theatre
- The Gregson Centre
- Greaves Park
- Judges' Lodgings
- Lancaster Castle
- Lancaster Cathedral
- Lancaster City Museum
- Lancaster Priory
- Lancaster Royal Grammar School
- Lancaster Town Hall
- Lune Millennium Bridge
- Queen Victoria Memorial
- The Ruskin - Library, Museum and Research Centre
- The Storey
- Westfield War Memorial Village
- Williamson Park

The city's main war memorial is in a garden adjacent to the Town Hall, near Dalton Square, and commemorates those who died in the first and second world wars, Korea and the Falklands; it is grade II listed.

=== Listed buildings ===
There are more than 330 listed buildings in Lancaster (excluding those in nearby civil parishes such as the Lune Aqueduct in Halton-with-Aughton parish). They include four at grade I and 22 at grade II*, the others being at grade II. Those at grade I, the highest level, are the Ashton Memorial, the Judges' Lodgings, Lancaster Castle and Lancaster Priory.

== Culture ==
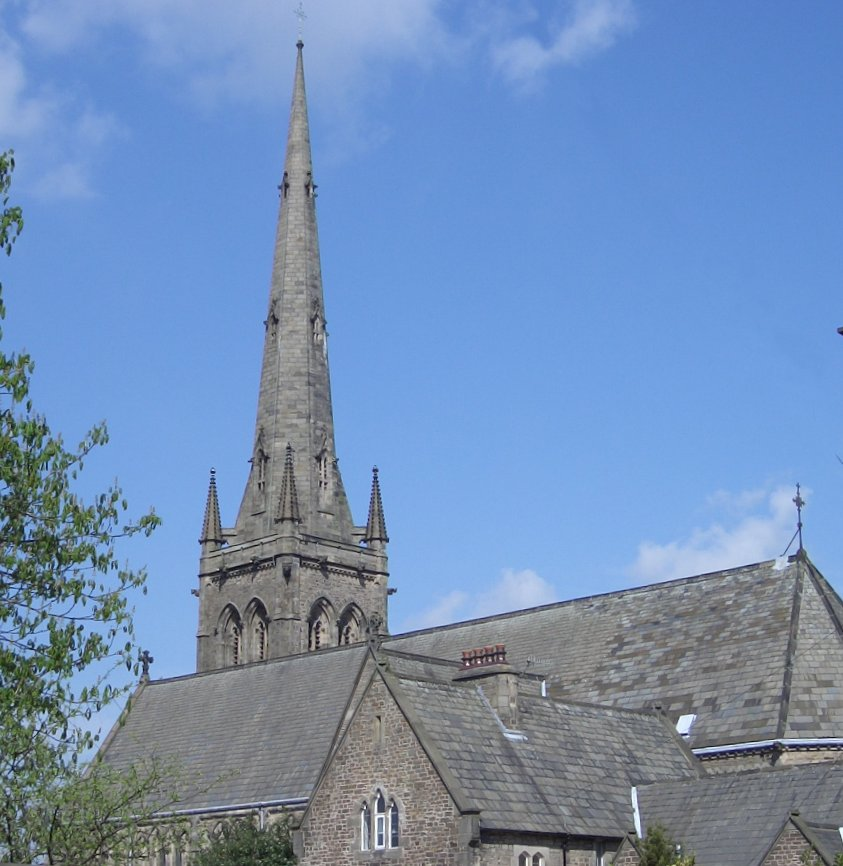
Lancaster Cathedral

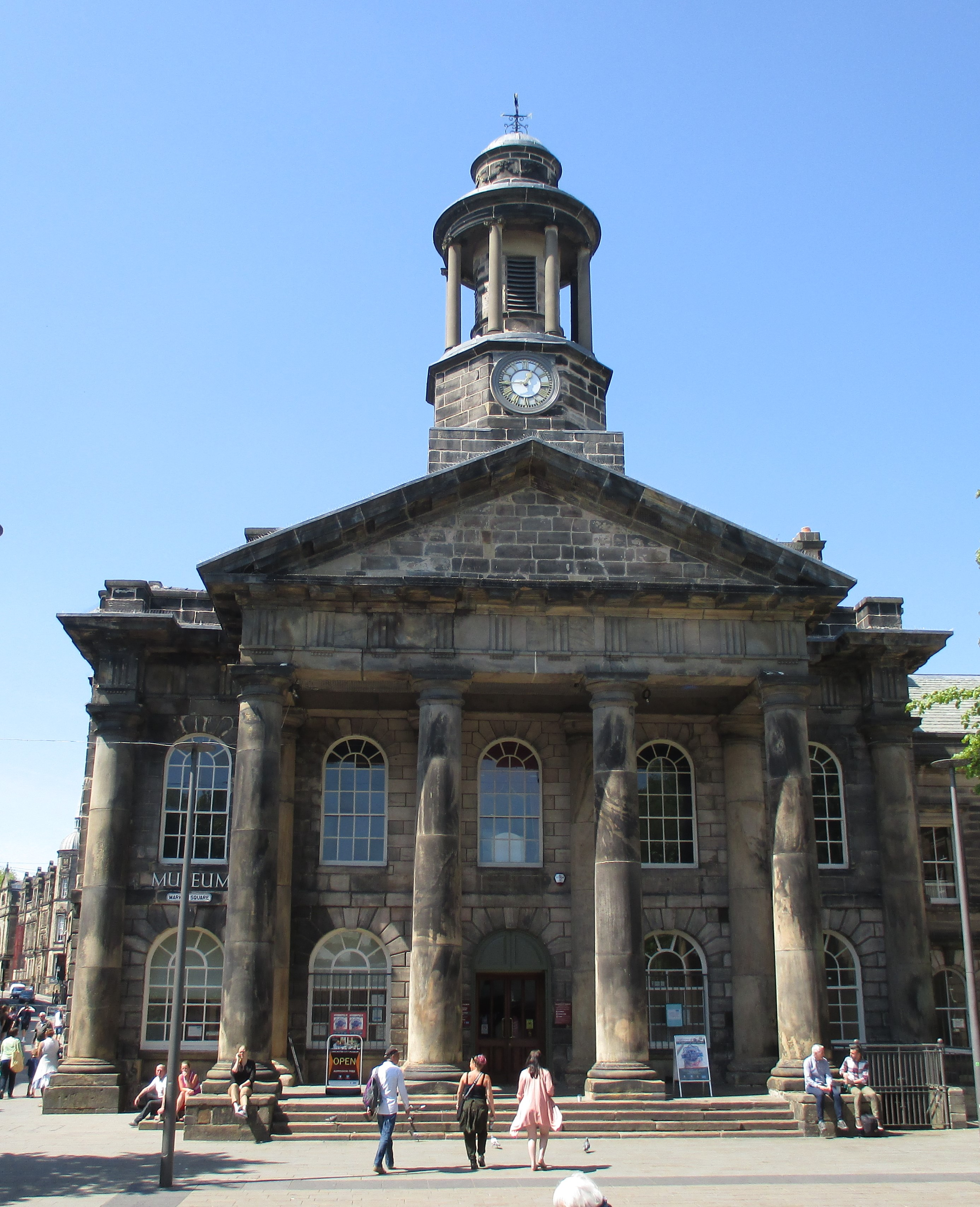
Lancaster City Museum

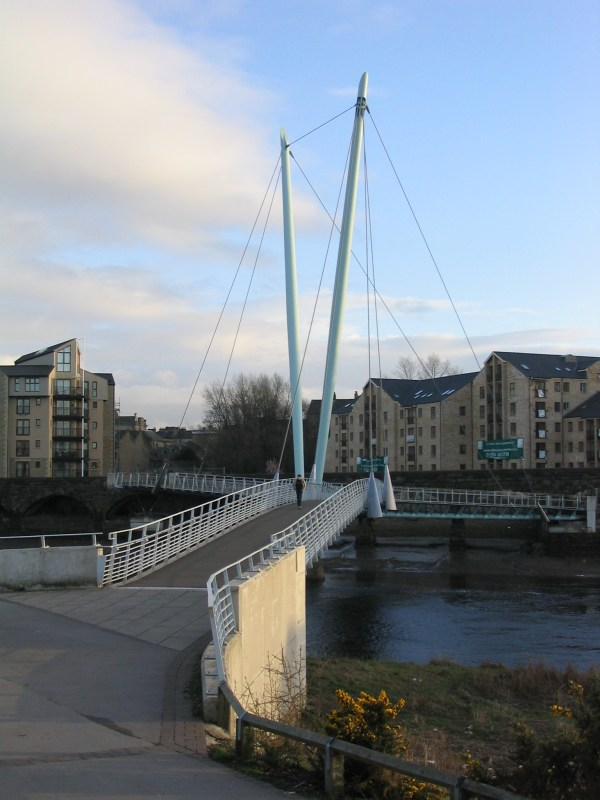
Lune Millennium Bridge

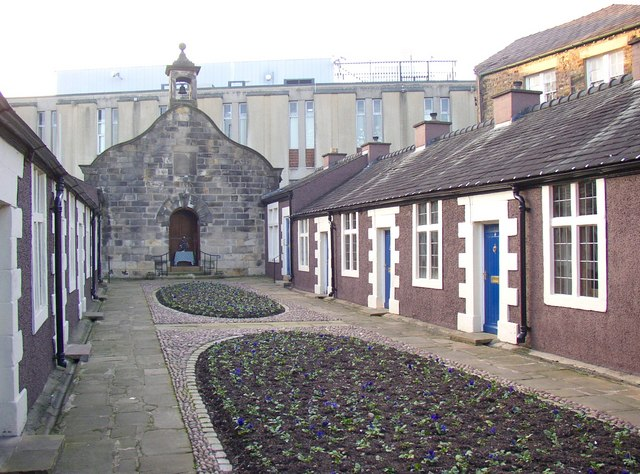
Penny's Hospital almshouses

Lancaster has a range of historic buildings and venues, having retained many fine examples of Georgian architecture. Lancaster Castle, the Priory Church of St Mary and the Edwardian Ashton Memorial are among the sites of historical importance. Its many museums include Lancaster City Museum, Maritime Museum, the Cottage Museum and the Judges' Lodgings Museum.

Lancaster Friends Meeting House, dating from 1708, is the longest continual Quaker meeting site in the world, with an original building built in 1677. George Fox, founder of Quakerism, was near the site several times in the 1660s and spent two years imprisoned in Lancaster Castle. The meeting house holds regular Quaker meetings and a wide range of cultural activities including adult learning, meditation, art classes, music and political meetings. Lancaster Grand Theatre is another historic cultural venue, under its many names. It has played a major part in social and cultural life since it was built in 1782.

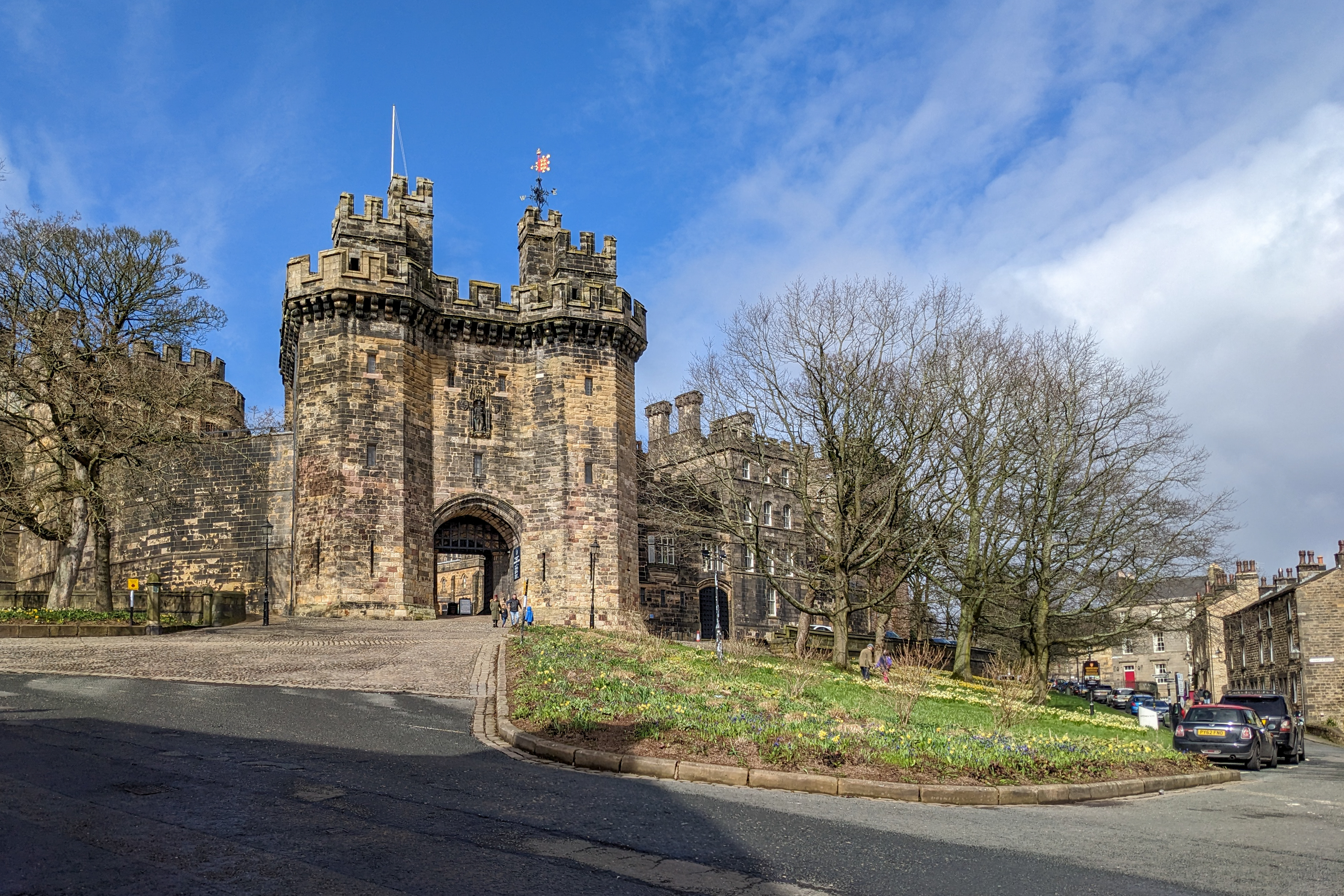
Lancaster Castle

Lancaster is known nationally for its Arts scene. There are around 600 business and organisations in the region involved directly or indirectly in arts and culture.

In 2009, several major arts bodies based in the district formed a consortium called Lancaster Arts Partners (LAP) to champion strategic development of arts activities in Lancaster District. Notable partners include Ludus Dance, More Music and the Dukes. LAP curates and promotes "Lancaster First Fridays", a monthly multi-disciplinary mini-festival under its brand "Lancaster Arts City".

Lancaster University has a public arts organisation, part of LAP, known as Lancaster Arts at Lancaster University. Its programmes include Lancaster's Nuffield Theatre, one of the largest professional studio theatres in Europe, the Peter Scott Gallery, with the most significant collection of Royal Lancastrian ceramics in Britain, and the Lancaster International Concerts Series, drawing nationally and internationally renowned classical and world-music artists.

The gallery in the Storey Creative Industries Centre is now programmed and run by Lancaster City Council. In 2013 the previous incumbent organisation "The Storey Gallery" moved out of the building and reformed as "Storey G2". The Storey Creative Industries Centre is also home to Lancaster's Litfest, which runs an annual literature festival. In the summer months Williamson Park hosts outdoor performances, including a Dukes "Play in the Park", which over the past 26 years has attracted 460,000 people, as the UK's biggest outdoor walkabout theatre event.

Lancaster is known as the Northern City of Ale, with almost 30 pubs serving cask ale. The pubs include the White Cross, Three Mariners, Borough and Water Witch. There are two cask ale breweries: Lancaster Brewery and a microbrewery run by the Borough. There is a local CAMRA (Campaign for Real Ale) branch at Lunesdale.

The Lancaster Grand Theatre and the Dukes are notable venues for live performance, as are the Yorkshire House (currently closed), Jailors Barrel, The John O' Gaunt and The Bobbin. Throughout the year events are held in and around the city, such as the Lancaster Music Festival, Lancaster Jazz Festival, and Chinese New Year celebrations in the city centre.

Every November the city hosts a daylight and art festival entitled "Light Up Lancaster", which includes a prominent fireworks display.

Lancaster still has two city-centre cinemas; Vue and the Dukes playhouse. The 1930s art deco Regal Cinema closed in 2006. The Gregson Centre is also known for small film screenings and cultural events.

=== Art and literature ===
John Henderson (c.1770–1853) painted many views of the town. One of these, together with a poetical illustration (which relates to the treacherous sands of Morecambe Bay) by Letitia Elizabeth Landon, was published in Fisher's Drawing Room Scrap Book, 1833.

=== Music ===
The city's semi-professional Haffner Orchestra has a reputation for classical music. It performs in the Ashton Hall in the city centre and at Lancaster University.

During parades and festivals it is common to see two other long standing musical groups perform. Lancaster City Brass is the oldest remaining brass band in the city, founded in 1946. Batala Lancaster is a 60-strong samba reggae drumming band, established in 2004 and one of 45 bands in 17 countries in the Batala project; they have twice won Best Brazilian Band at Notting Hill Carnival.

Lancaster has been producing successful bands and musicians since the 1990s, notably the drummer Keith Baxter of 3 Colours Red.The all-girl punk-rock band Angelica used the Lancaster Musicians' Co-operative, the main rehearsal and recording studio in the area.

The city has also produced many other musicians, including singer and songwriter John Waite, who first became known as lead singer of The Babys and had a solo #1 hit in the US, "Missing You". As part of the band Bad English, John Waite also had a #1 hit in the Billboard top hundred in the 1970s called "When I See You Smile". Additionally, Paul James, better known as The Rev, former guitarist of English punk band Towers of London who is now in the band Day 21 and plays guitar live on tour for The Prodigy; Chris Acland, drummer of the early 1990s shoegaze band Lush; Tom English, drummer of North East indie band Maxïmo Park and Steve Kemp, drummer of the indie band Hard-Fi.

Lancaster continues to produce bands and musicians such as singer-songwriter Jay Diggins, and acts like The Lovely Eggs, receiving considerable national radio play and press coverage in recent years. More recently, Lancaster locals Massive Wagons signed to Nottingham-based independent label Earache Records.

Since 2006, Lancaster Library has hosted regular music events under the Get it Loud in Libraries initiative. Musicians such as Clean Bandit, The Long Blondes, Ellie Goulding, Marina And The Diamonds, Jessie J, Wolf Alice, The Wombats, The Thrills, Kate Nash, Adele and Bat for Lashes have taken part. Get It Loud in Libraries has gained national exposure, featuring on The One Show on BBC1 and having gigs reviewed in Observer Music Monthly, NME and Art Rocker.

Notable popular music venues include The Dukes, The Grand Theatre, and The Gregson Centre.

==== Festivals ====
The Lancaster Jazz and Lancaster Music Festivals are respectively held every September and October, at venues throughout the city. In 2013 the headline jazz act was The Neil Cowley Trio, performing at The Dukes, whilst one of the Lancaster Music Festival headline acts was Jay Diggins at the Dalton Rooms.

The Highest Point Festival takes place in Williamson Park each summer, and is a successor to the A-Wing festival which was held in Lancaster Castle from 2014.

=== Media ===
Local radio stations include Heart North West (formerly "The Bay"), BBC Radio Lancashire, and Beyond Radio is a voluntary, non-profit community radio station for Lancaster and Morecambe.

Lancaster University has its own student radio station, Bailrigg FM, an online student-run television station called LA1TV (formerly LUTube.tv) and a student-run newspaper named SCAN.

Local TV coverage is provided by BBC North West Tonight and ITV Granada Reports.

The city was home to the film production company A1 Pictures, which founded the independent film brand Capture.

Commercially available newspapers include The Lancaster Guardian and The Visitor (mainly targeted at residents of Morecambe). Virtual Lancaster, founded in 1999, is a non-commercial volunteer-led resource website also featuring local news, events and visitor information.

=== Twinned cities ===
Lancaster is twinned with:

- Aalborg, Denmark
- Lublin, Poland
- Perpignan, France
- Rendsburg, Germany
- Växjö, Sweden

== Education ==
=== Higher education ===
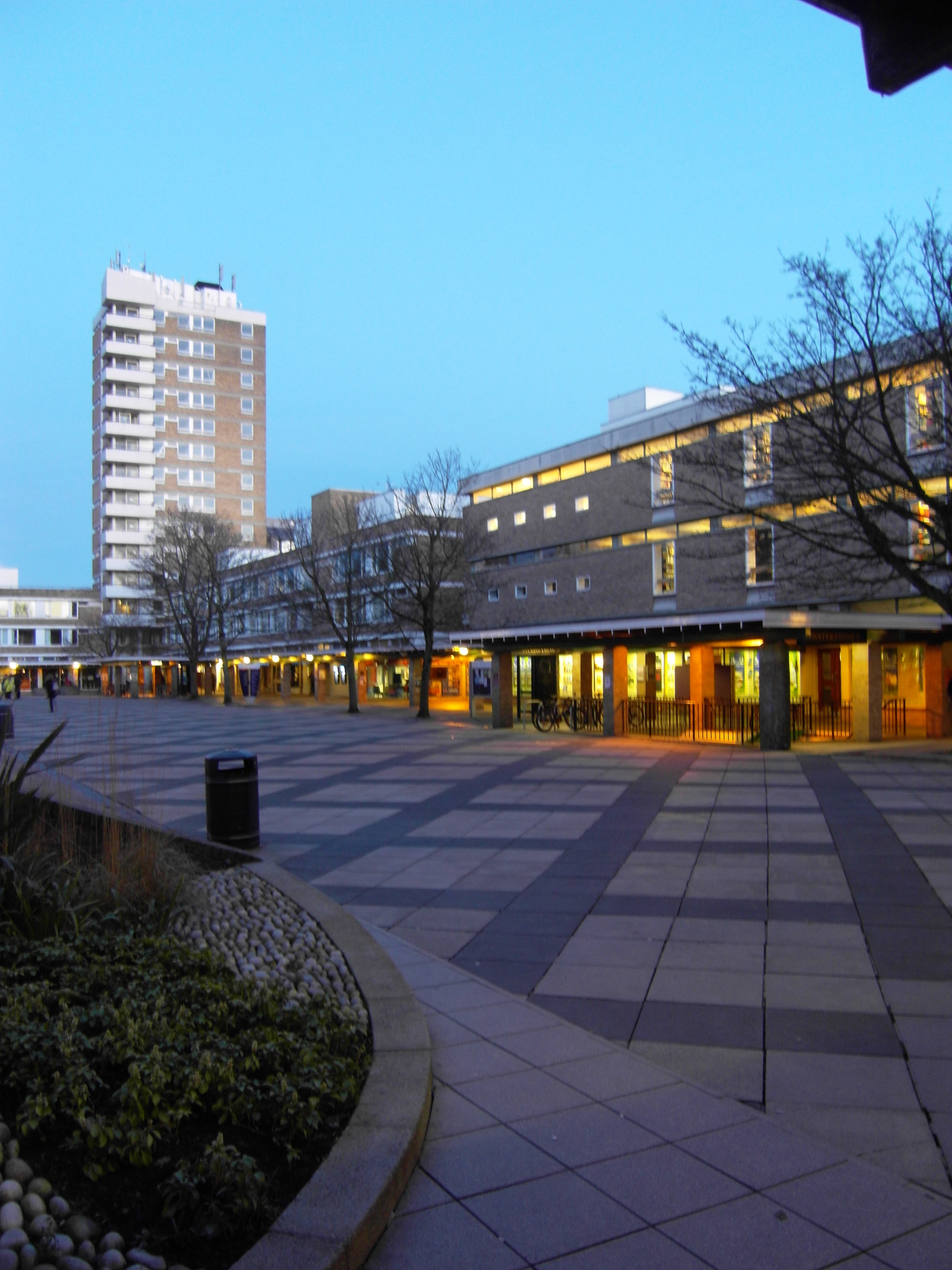
Lancaster University

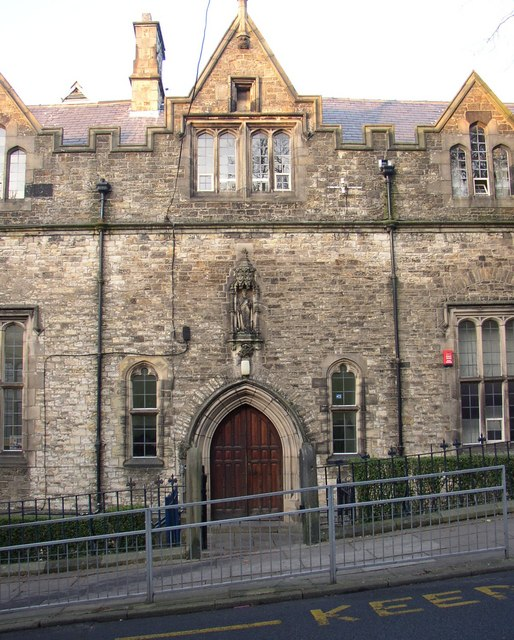
Lancaster Royal Grammar School

At Bailrigg south of the city is Lancaster University, a research university founded in 1964 as one of the seven "plate glass universities". It has an annual income of about £325 million (2020/21), 3,000 staff and 16,403 Lancaster-based students in 2021/22. Its business school is one of two in the country to gain a six-star research rating. Its physics department rated #1 in the United Kingdom in 2008. InfoLab21 at the university is a Centre of Excellence for Information and Communication Technologies. LEC (Lancaster Environment Centre) has over 200 staff and shares premises with the government-funded CEH. In 2023 it was 10th, 12th and 14th out of 120 UK universities in "the three main UK league tables". In 2017 it was rated 21st nationally for research in The Times Higher league table. For teaching, it gained the highest Gold ranking for quality in the 2017 government TEF, and in 2018 was ranked 9th for its teaching by The Independent and 9th by The Guardian. The Times Higher placed it 137th worldwide for research and 58th worldwide for arts and humanities. Lancaster University was named International University of the Year by The Times and The Sunday Times Good University Guide in 2020. It has campuses in Malaysia, China and Ghana and plans one in Leipzig, Germany.

Lancaster is also home to a campus of the University of Cumbria – more centrally located on the site of the former St Martin's College – which was inaugurated in 2007. It provides undergraduate and postgraduate courses in the arts, social sciences, business, teacher training, health care and nursing. St Martin's college was founded in 1962 as Lancaster College of Education, and took its name from Martin of Tours, a Roman soldier who converted to Christianity, because its premises were a former barracks of the King's Own Royal Regiment. The college merged with Cumbria Institute of the Arts, in Carlisle, and parts of the University of Central Lancashire, having previously absorbed Charlotte Mason College in Ambleside, to become the University of Cumbria.

=== Further education ===
- Lancaster and Morecambe College

=== Secondary schools ===
- Lancaster Royal Grammar School and Lancaster Girls' Grammar School are selective-entry grammar schools. In 2016 both were rated by the Sunday Timesin the top 50 UK schools based on student achievement.
- Ripley St Thomas Church of England Academy
- Our Lady's Catholic College
- Central Lancaster High School
- Skerton Community High School (now closed)
- Jamea Al Kauthar Islamic College, in the former Royal Albert Hospital building on Ashton Road, is an independent girls' school, providing education in a Muslim tradition.

=== Primary schools ===
- Lancaster Steiner School
- Scotforth St Pauls CofE Primary School
- Moorside Primary School
- St Bernadette's Catholic Primary School
- Bowerham Primary School
- The Cathedral Catholic Primary School
- Dallas Road Community Primary School
- Willow Lane (formerly Marsh) Community Primary School
- Castle View (formerly Ridge) Community Primary School
- Lancaster Christ Church CofE Primary School
- St Joseph's Catholic Primary School
- Skerton St Lukes CofE Primary School
- Lancaster Ryelands Primary School

Special Educational Needs (SEN) Schools

- The Loyne
- Morecambe Road School

== Religious sites ==
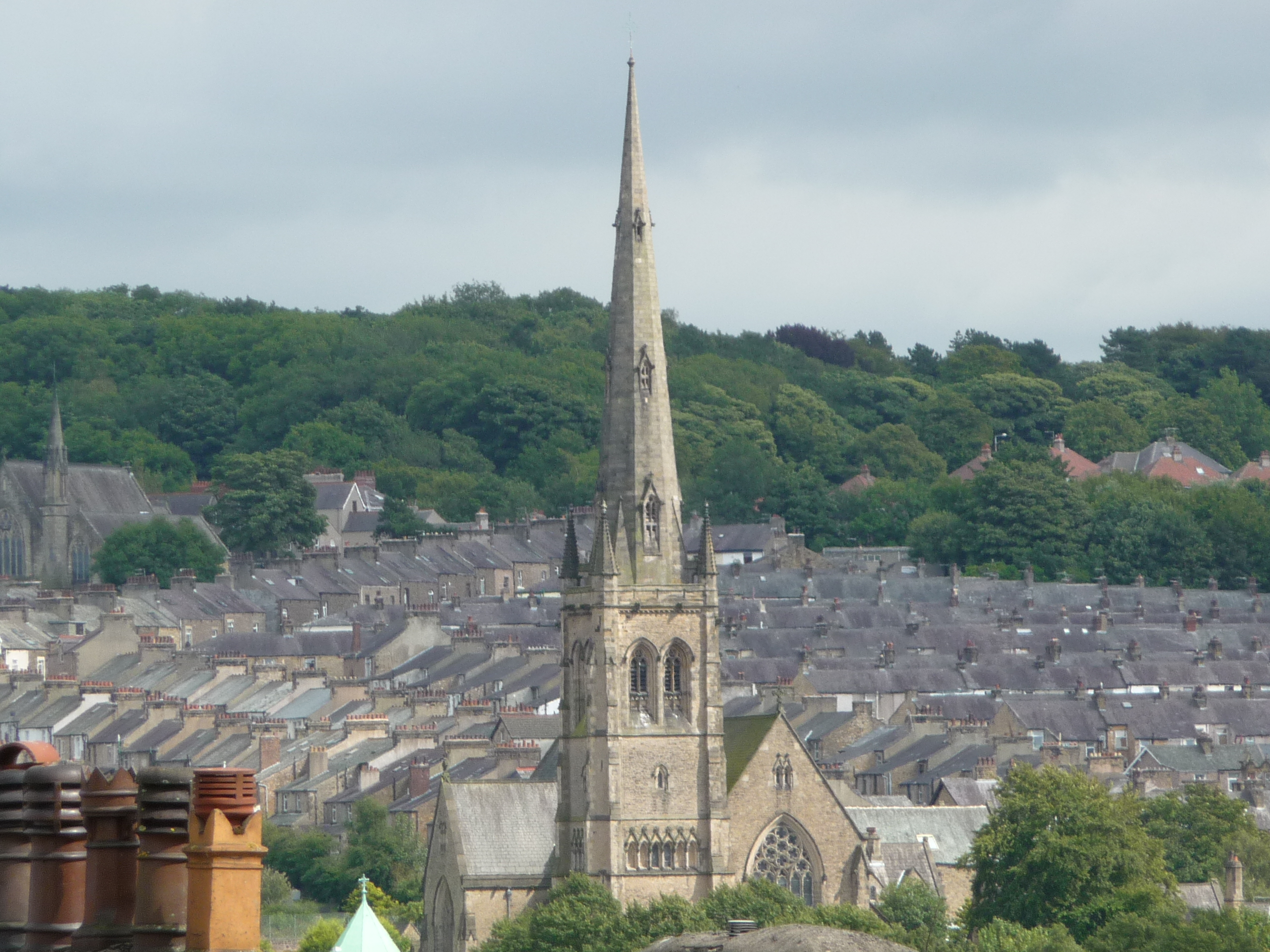
Lancaster Cathedral

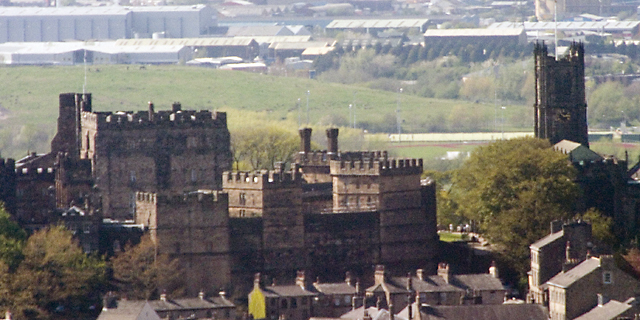
Castle and Priory of Lancaster

Lancaster is home to many churches and other places of worship. Notable churches in the city include the grade II*-listed Lancaster Cathedral (Catholic), which is located on the brow of the hill beside the canal to the east of the city centre. Its spire can be seen on the cityscape. It was built in 1798 originally as a mission church for the city before it was rebuilt between 1857 and 1859 on a different site with the spire and tower. It is an active place of worship.

Lancaster Priory (Anglican) is a grade I listed building on the high ground adjacent to Lancaster Castle. It dates largely from about 1430, with a 1754-55 tower and later work.

The Friends Meeting House, near the station, dates from 1708 and is grade II* listed.

Other notable churches in the city include:

Active:

- Christ Church (Grade II listed parish church)
- Ripley School Chapel (Part of the Church of England school)
- St Thomas' Church (Grade II listed and active parish church)
- St Paul's Church, Scotforth (Grade II listed and parish church)
- St Luke's Church, Skerton (Grade II listed and parish church)
- St Bernadette's Church, Lancaster

Redundant:

- Lancaster Cemetery Chapels
- St John the Evangelist's Church (Closed in 1981; now in the Churches Conservation Trust)

Converted:

- St Michael's Chapel, Lancaster Moor Hospital (now flats)

The city has places of worship for Catholic, Baptist, Jehovah's Witness, Latter Day Saints and Methodists, as well as the Salvation Army and community churches. Lancaster is also home to several mosques. Notable mosques are: Moorlands Islamic Centre, Lancaster Islamic Society, Raza Mosque Lancaster and prayer rooms in the University of Cumbria in Lancaster and University of Lancaster.

== Sport ==
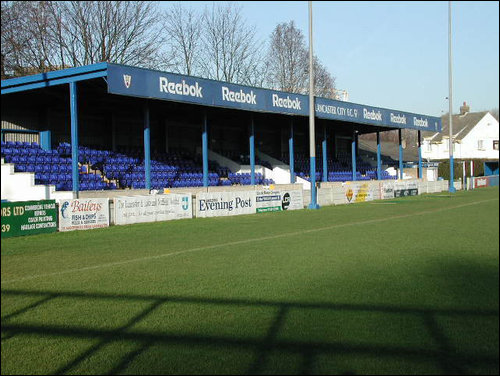
Giant Axe Ground, Home of Lancaster City F.C.

Lancaster City F.C. plays in the Northern Premier League Premier Division, having won promotion as champions of Division One North in 2016–2017. The club plays home matches at the Giant Axe, which has a capacity of 3,500 (513 seated) and was formed in 1911 as Lancaster Town F.C. The club has been seven-times Lancashire FA Challenge cup winners and in 2010–11 won the Northern Premier League President's Cup for a second time.

Lancaster John O'Gaunt Rowing Club is the fifth-oldest surviving rowing club in the UK, outside the universities. It competes nationally at regattas and heads races run by British Rowing. The clubhouse stands next to the weir at Skerton.

It is one of the cities that rotates hosting the International Youth Games, a multi-sport Olympics-style event featuring competitors from Lancaster's twin towns: Rendsburg (Germany), Perpignan (France), Viana do Castelo (Portugal), Aalborg (Denmark), Almere (Netherlands), Lublin (Poland) and Växjö (Sweden). The games were cancelled at the start of the COVID-19 pandemic, but Lancaster resumed participation in 2022 when the games re-started.

Lancaster Cricket Club is sited near the River Lune. It has two senior teams that participate in the Palace Shield. Rugby union is a popular sport in the area, with the local clubs being Vale of Lune RUFC and Lancaster CATS.

Lancaster is home to the Golf Centre, Lansil Golf Club, Forest Hills and Lancaster Golf Club. Lancaster Amateur Swimming and Waterpolo Club competes in the north-west. It trains at Salt Ayre and at Lancaster University Sports Centre. Lancaster is home to a senior UK team. Water polo is also popular in the area.

The local athletics track near the Salt Ayre Sports Centre is home to Lancaster AC and Morecambe AC. It fields athletes across disciplines including track and field, cross country, road and fell running. It competes in several local and national leagues including the Young Athletics League, the Northern Athletics League and the local Mid Lancs League (Cross-Country in Winter, and Track and Field in Summer).

== Notable people ==
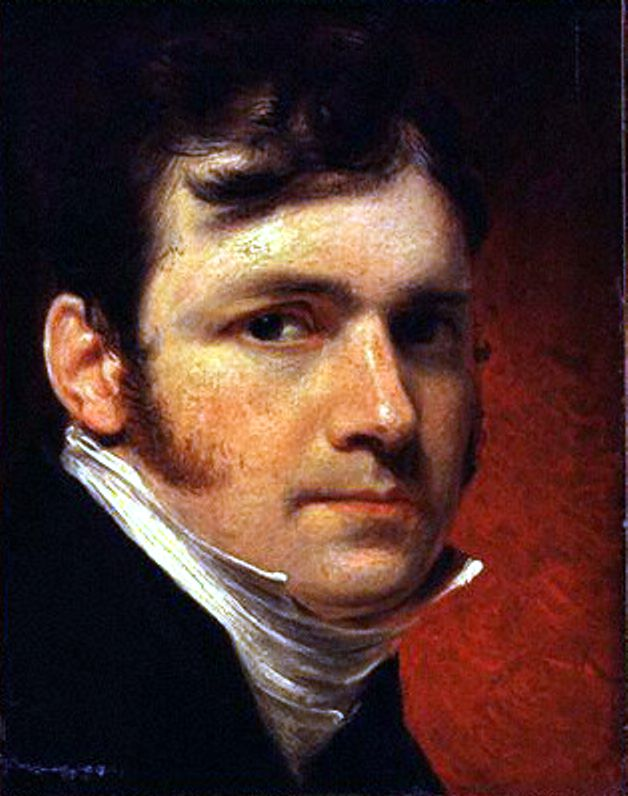
James Lonsdale, 1810

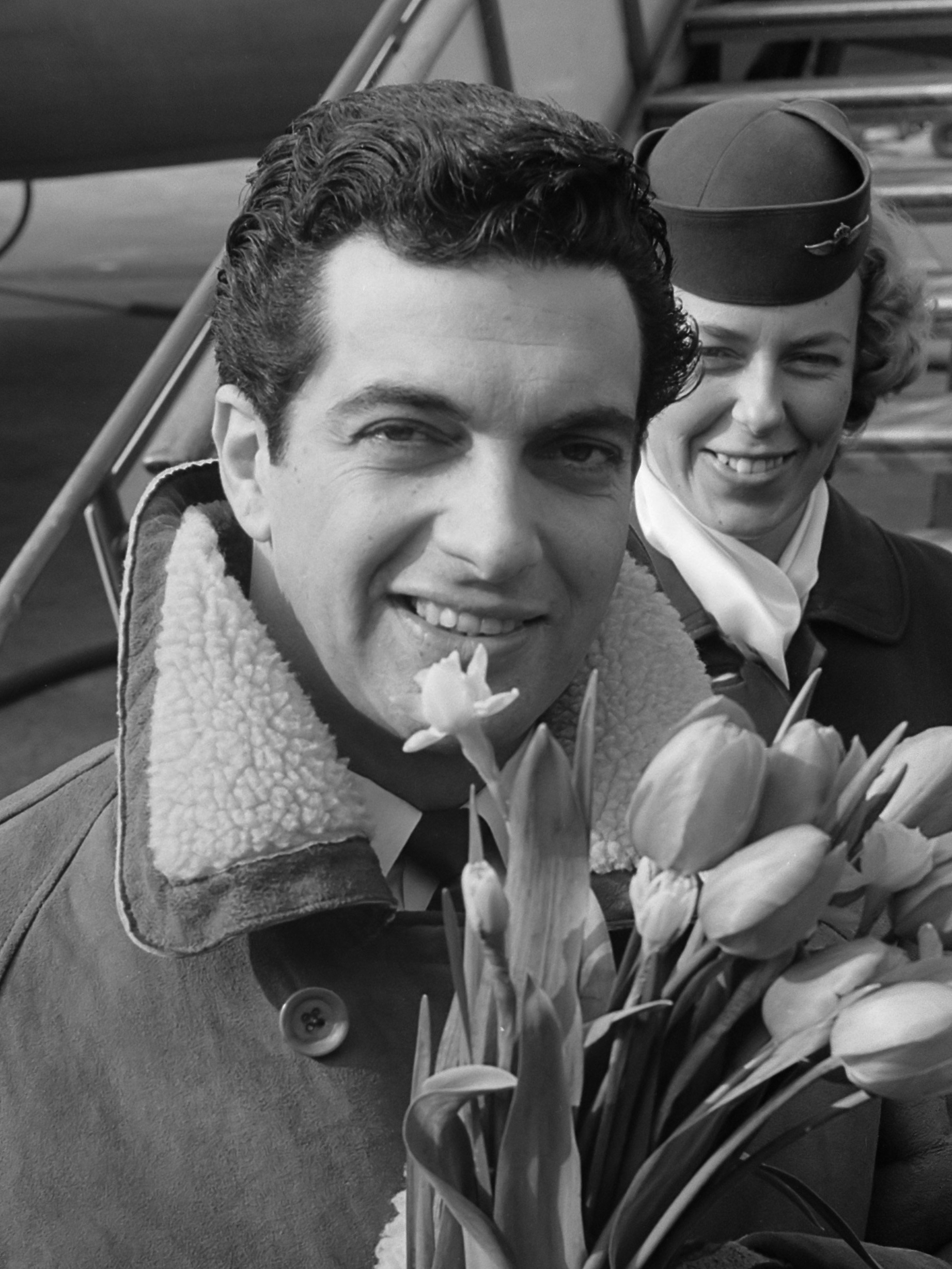
Frankie Vaughan, 1962

=== Arts and entertainment ===
- Joe Abercrombie (born 1974) – fantasy writer and film editor, was born in Lancaster and attended LRGS.
- Cherith Baldry (born 1947) – children's and fantasy writer, was born in Lancaster.
- John Chippendall Montesquieu Bellew (1823–1874) - an English author, preacher and public reader.
- Laurence Binyon (1869–1943) – poet and dramatist, was born in Lancaster.
- Jim Bowen (1937–2018) – comedian, was formerly deputy headteacher of Caton Primary School, died at Royal Lancaster Infirmary
- Dustin Demri-Burns (born 1978) – actor, writer and comedian
- James Lonsdale (1777–1839) - a fashionable portrait painter.
- Hubert Henry Norsworthy (1885–1961) – organist and composer, died in Lancaster.
- Mabel Pakenham-Walsh (1937–2013) – artist, was born in Lancaster.
- Jon Richardson – comedian, grew up in Lancaster and attended LRGS.
- Thomas Thompson (1880–1951) – writer and broadcaster.
- Frankie Vaughan (1928–1999) – singer and actor, attended Lancaster College of Art
- John Waite (born 1952) – rock musician, was born in Lancaster.
- Keith Wilkinson (born ca.1955) – TV news reporter, was born in Lancaster
- Meg Wynn Owen (1939-2022) - actress, was born in Lancaster

=== Business ===
- Henry Cort (c. 1740–1800) – English ironmaster and inventor, was probably born in Lancaster.
- James Crosby (born 1956) – chief executive of HBOS until 2006, attended LRGS
- Thomas Edmondson (1792–1851) – businessman and inventor of the Edmondson railway ticket, was born in Lancaster.
- Robert Gillow (1704–1772) - founded Gillows of Lancaster and London, an English furniture manufacturer.
- Sir Ronald Halstead (1927–2021) – chair and Chief Executive of the Beecham Group in 1984–1985 and Deputy Chair of British Steel in 1986–1994 was born in Lancaster and attended LRGS
- James Williamson (1842–1930) – businessman and politician who created Williamson Park and Ashton Memorial, was born in Lancaster and attended LRGS

=== Science and humanities ===
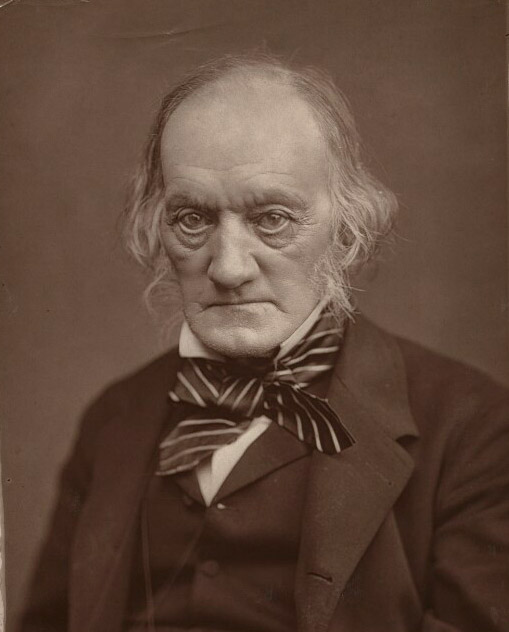
Richard Owen, 1878

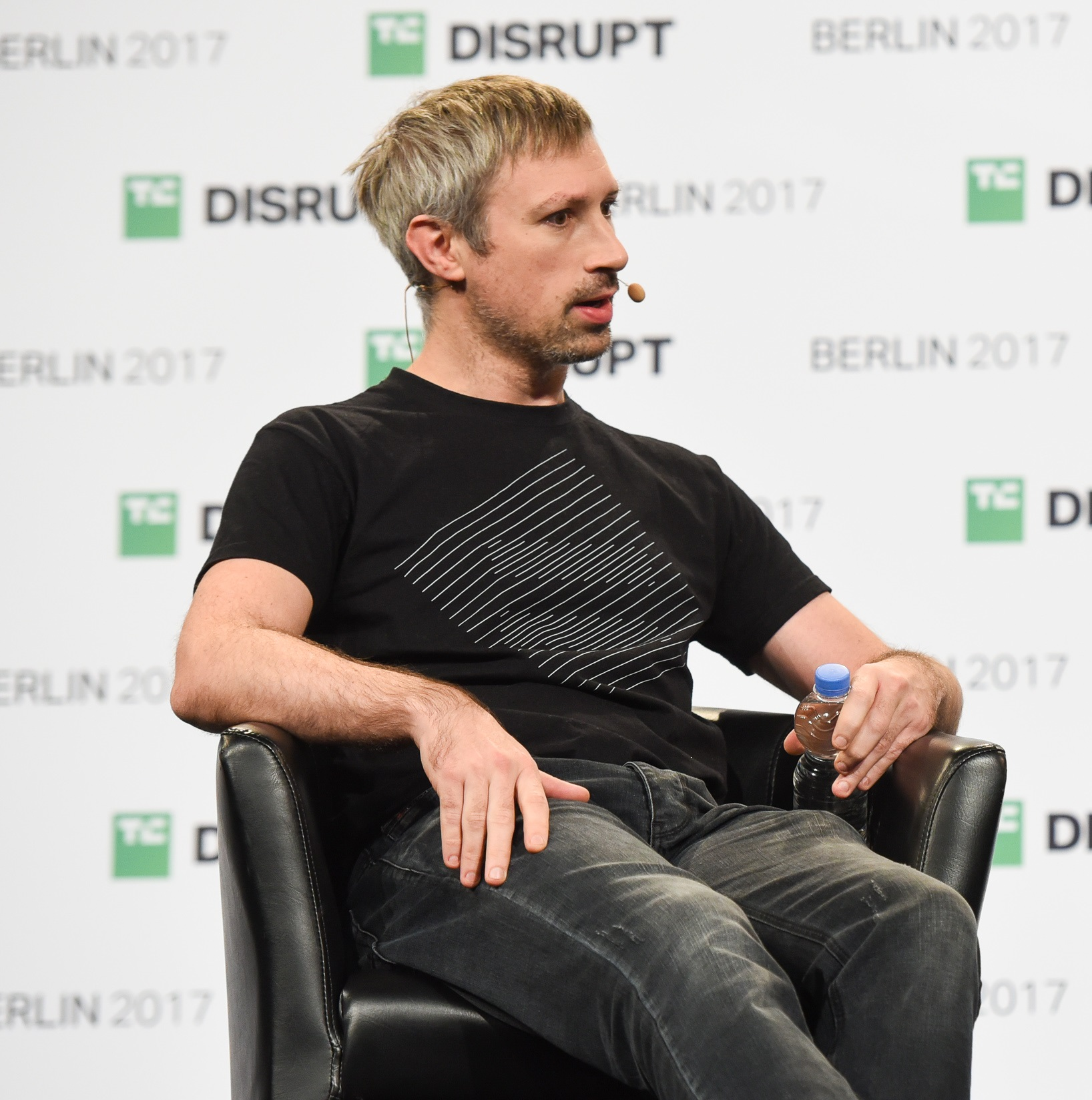
Gavin Wood, 2017

- J. L. Austin (1911–1960) – philosopher and developer of the theory of speech acts, was born in Lancaster.
- George Edmondson (1798–1863) - an English educationalist.
- John Ambrose Fleming (1849–1945) – electrical engineer and physicist, known for inventing the vacuum tube and was born in Lancaster.
- Sir Edward Frankland (1825–1899) – chemist who originated the concept of valence, was born near Lancaster and educated at LRGS.
- John Heysham (1753–1834) - an English physician, now remembered as a statistician.
- Jaroslav Krejčí (1916–2014) – Czech-British sociologist, was a professor at the University of Lancaster and died in Lancaster.
- Geoffrey Leech (1936–2014) – linguistics researcher, was a professor at the Lancaster University and died in Lancaster.
- Sir Richard Owen (1804–1892) – biologist who coined the term "dinosaur", lived in Brock Street.
- Sir William Turner (1832–1916) – anatomist and academic, was born in Lancaster.
- Paul Wellings (born 1953) – ecologist, served as a professor and Vice-Chancellor of Lancaster University
- Emily Williamson (1855–1936) - English philanthropist and co-founder of the RSPB, was born in Lancaster.
- Gavin Wood (born 1980) – computer scientist, co-founded and headed Ethereum.

=== Politics, journalism and crime ===
- Henry D. Gilpin (1801–1860) – Attorney General of the United States, was born in Lancaster.
- Lauren Jeska (born 1974) – an athlete who was convicted of the attempted murder of an official, Ralph Knibbs.
- Erik de Mauny (1920–1997) – foreign correspondent, died in Lancaster.
- Buck Ruxton (1899–1936) – marital murderer, resided and practised medicine at 2 Dalton Square.
- Sir Lancelot Sanderson (1863–1944) – Conservative MP for Appleby and judge, died in Lancaster.
- William Swainson (1809–1884) - the second, and last, Attorney-General (New Zealand)

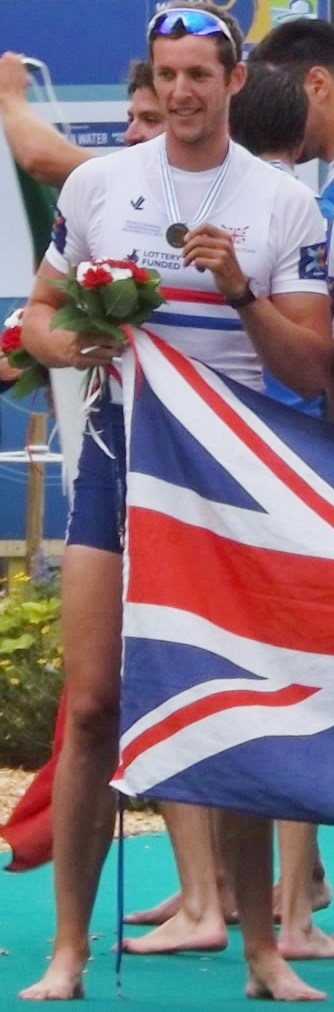
Scott Durant, 2015

=== Sport ===
- Michael Allen (1933–1995) – international cricketer, played 193 First-class cricket games, died in Lancaster.
- James Beattie (born 1978) – professional footballer, played 443 games, born in Lancaster.
- Scott Durant (born 1988) – rower, gold medallist at the 2016 Summer Olympics, was a pupil at LRGS
- Trevor Glover (born 1951) – first-class cricketer and rugby union player, was born in Lancaster.
- Sarah Illingworth (born 1963) – international cricketer (New Zealand), was born in Lancaster.
- Edward Jackson (1849–1926) – first-class cricketer, was born in Lancaster.
- John Jackson (1841–1906) – first-class cricketer, played 15 First-class cricket matches, was born in Lancaster.
- Scott McTominay (born 1996) – footballer, was born in Lancaster; played 178 games for Manchester United and 61 for Scotland
- Jason Queally (born 1970) – Track cyclist, gold medallist at the 2000 Summer Olympics, was a pupil at LRGS
- Matt Rogerson (born 1993) – professional Rugby Union player currently with London Irish, was born in Lancaster.
- Fred Shinton (1883–1923) – professional footballer, played 163 games, died in Lancaster.
- Alan Warriner-Little (born 1962) – champion darts player, was born in Lancaster.

== See also ==
- Lancaster power stations
