= Port of Lancaster =

The Port of Lancaster was located at the lowest crossing point on the River Lune and constitutes the central element of maritime Lancaster in north-west England. It dates back to Roman times, but is now based at Glasson Dock.

== History ==
=== Early origins ===
The port dates back to Roman times: Lancaster Roman Fort was established around 80 A.D. and the local legend of a Roman harbour is supported by the suggestion that the garrison would have been supplied more efficiently by ship than by road. However evidence of a port here is scant for both the Roman period and the subsequent Viking settlement in Lancaster.

=== Medieval development ===
When Lancaster received its charter as a borough in 1193, this recognised the development of the town. It was in 1297 that Lancaster was recorded as a port along with Cartmel and Workington and Ravenglass.

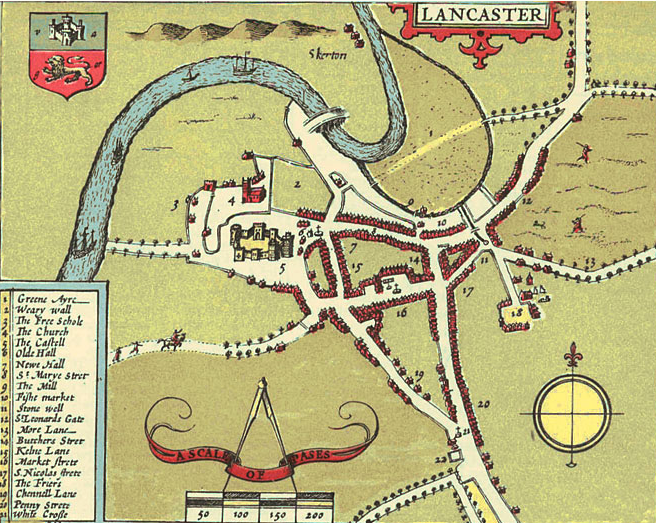
John Speed's map of Lancaster, 1610 depicting ships visiting Lancaster
