= St Luke's Church, Skerton =

Coordinates: 54.056465°N 2.798143°W

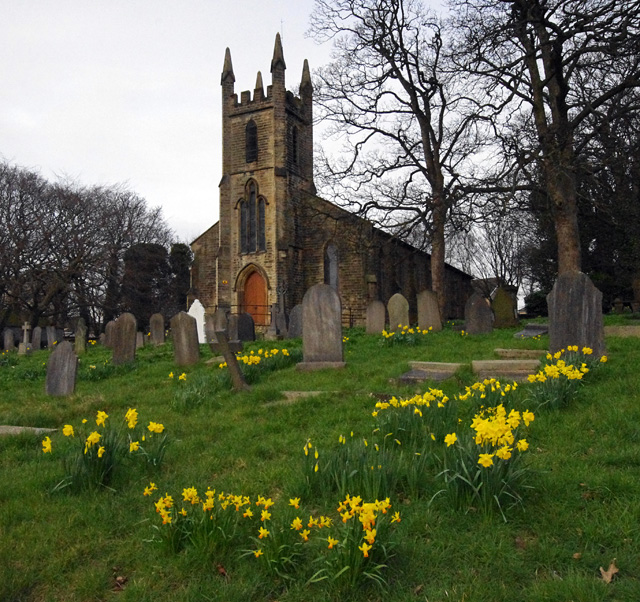
- St Luke's Church, Skerton

- Location in the City of Lancaster
- OS grid reference: SD 47873 62572
- Location: Skerton, City of Lancaster, Lancashire
- Country: England
- Denomination: Anglican
- Website: Facebook page

Architecture
- Functional status: Active
- Heritage designation: Grade II
- Designated: 13 March 1995

Specifications
- Height: 62 feet (19 m)

Administration
- Province: York
- Diocese: Blackburn
- Archdeaconry: Blackburn
- Deanery: Lancaster

St Luke's Church is an active Anglican church in the suburb of Skerton in Lancaster, Lancashire, England. It is a grade II listed building. It was built in 1833 as the parish church of Skerton which was at the time a township in the hundred of Lonsdale. Skerton became part of the City of Lancaster in 1974.
