= The Gregson Centre =

Arts and community centre in Lancaster, England

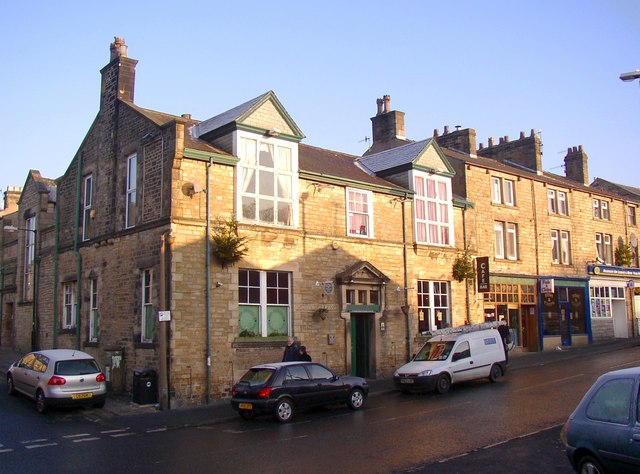

- Location in Lancaster
- Former names: Gregson Institute
- Location: Lancaster, Lancashire, England
- Coordinates: 54.048°N 2.791°W

Construction
- Built: 1889
- Architect: Paley and Austin

Website
- www.gregson.co.uk

The Gregson Centre in Lancaster, England (previously known as the Gregson Institute) is an arts and community centre, music venue and Cafe-bar. There is a small cinema space, function room, 'Yarden' and a lift enabling access to all public areas. It is one of the last medium-sized music venues in the area, and is owned and managed by a charity, the Gregson Community Association.

== History ==
The Gregson Institute was founded in 1889 as a memorial to Henry Gregson. The Gregson family included his father Samuel Gregson and his brother Samuel Gregson, Mayor of the City of Lancaster and Liberal MP 1847, co-founder of the Natural History Museum, and one of the Victorians responsible for giving the world the word "dinosaur". Following in the family tradition, Henry himself was elected Mayor of Lancaster in 1850. The funds for the building came from many notable sources including James Williamson (later Baron Ashton) and the Storey Brothers. It was designed by Paley and Austin. Henry also gave funds to establish the nearby Christ Church. A hall was added in 1912, named "The Bartlett Hall" after the first vicar of Christ Church. The building was originally Temperance run by "The Lancaster Coffee Company", then used by Christ Church Primary School as the School Hall until becoming surplus when the new School was built on Derwent Road. After it had stood empty for several years, a group of like-minded souls in 1984 created a charity called The Freehold Community Association and bought the building to run as a community centre. The charity has since changed its name to The Gregson Community Association, later still (2006) incorporating to form the Gregson Community Association Limited.

In the early 1990s, the centre was close to bankruptcy. Even the valiant efforts of volunteers and the founding committees of the charity (FCA) since 1983 were not enough. The Gregson had lost its entertainment licence in 1993 and could not pay its debts. The main priority, therefore, was to get the licences back and reopen the centre as soon as possible. In discussions with the then committee it was decided that the centre needed professional management on a day-to-day basis to survive. Gregson Centre Ltd (GCL) was set up by Richard Dow and Graeme Kirk who were keen to save their favourite community centre and to preserve the future of what they believed to be a vital part of the community. A contract was drawn up by both parties ensuring that the new company (GCL) worked within the aims and objectives of the charity.

Richard Dow and Graeme Kirk (Bond) had connections with the Gregson which go back to the dawn of it all in 1984. They served on committees throughout the 80s at various times as chair and Treasurer, and had originally met and become friends at the Gregson. Both lived in the area and had young families. Graeme was a professional actor with an interest in the Arts, and Richard a local businessman with a company involved in educational resources for schools. Graeme became the Gregson Centre manager on a daily basis and Richard worked as the financial and business manager.

Following Richard Dow's death Graeme took over full management of the centre for a while before selling his interest in the business to the charity for £50,000.

In 2020, during the national lockdown, the centre was on the brink of closing down and was brought back into the full ownership of the Gregson Community Association (GCA). It was refurbished by volunteers and re-opened its doors when the lockdown was lifted. In 2022 it appointed its first CEO Charles Tyrer, and now has a small staff team running its day-to-day operations. It is now open 11 am – 11 pm 7 days a week.

Over the last couple of decades, there have been notable fundraising successes both instigated and managed by the Gregson Community Association charity. For example, the acquisition of the two properties next to the Gregson (formerly a chip shop and off-licence - though the chip shop has been passed on to a separate business) has provided the larger downstairs bar area as well as the outside seating area. Other improvements were the provision of better toilets, baby changing and disabled facilities, kitchen, staircase, windows and two new bars. The two meeting rooms upstairs were also knocked through to provide an extra performance and meetings area. They were even inspired to raise funds and build the popular small cinema space. Most recently a lift has been installed to enable disabled access throughout the public areas of the building. The Gregson Community Association charity continues to work to promote and preserve the centre for the community.

The centre has received many accolades one being from the local paper Lancaster Guardian who listed The Gregson in their 'top ten places to visit' and described the place as "exactly what a Community Centre should be".

== Artists who have appeared at The Gregson Centre ==
- Julian Arguelles
- Bogshed
- Gideon Conn
- John Etheridge
- Joni Fuller
- Guns of Navarone
- Hotcha
- The Imp of the Perverse
- Billy Jenkins
- Tim Kliphuis
- Christine Tobin
- Pleix
- Blyth Power
- The Wedding Present
