= Skerton =

Coordinates: 54.0595°N 2.8005°W

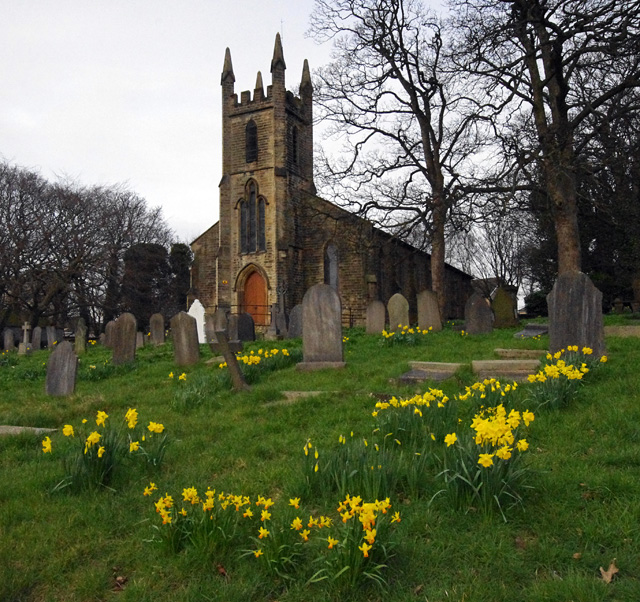
- St Luke's Church

- Location of suburb in Lancaster unparished area Location in the City of Lancaster district Location within Lancashire
- District: Lancaster
- Shire county: Lancashire
- Region: North West
- Country: England
- Sovereign state: United Kingdom
- UK Parliament: Lancaster and Wyre

Skerton is an area in the north of Lancaster, Lancashire, England, on the other side of the River Lune to the castle. It was formerly a township, but in the late 1800s it was incorporated into Lancaster and the neighbouring townships. Skerton Bridge takes the A6 southwards towards the city centre.

== Origin of the name ==
The origin of the name is based on Old Norse sker, Skerton meaning the tun by the reefs (i.e. sand banks in the River Lune which ran through the original township). The history of the township to 1914 is shown in the Victoria County History.

Neighbouring Lancaster annexed parts of Skerton in the late nineteenth and early twentieth centuries, when the township was divided between Lancaster and adjacent parishes. The records, show variants the name over time, 'Skerton' (1200), 'Skereton' (1292), 'Storton' (1201), and 'Sherton' (1292). Of those evolutions of the original Norse name Skerton is the modern version.

== History ==
After the Conquest of 1066, which saw control of the realm of England transferred from the Anglo-Saxon kings to William the Conqueror, the town of Lancaster was seized as the personal fiefdom of the Norman King. The historic hill that now plays host to the castle had previously been the site of a Roman fort and, following the Norman Conquest, was designated as the site upon which to build what is now Lancaster Castle.

The land being carved up by the Norman aristocracy, the land playing host to 'Schertune' was granted to the Halton fee, of which Earl Tostig was a member. Tostig, having been loyal to the Norman King was rewarded in this instance with personal possession of Skerton, (Amongst other rewards of land). During his possession, the Skerton was assessed as being 'six-plough lands'.

After Tostig's possession, Skerton was retained in demesne by the Lords of Lancaster; in 1094, demesne tithes from Skerton were granted to St Martin's at Sees by Count Roger of Poitou. The land surrounding Skerton remained more or less 'Virgo intacta', an exception being made when half a Plough-land was granted to William De Skerton, (Reeve from 1201 to 1202), to be held by this Serjeanty.

In 1297, it has been recorded that there were three free tenants, these being Alan de Paries, the Abbot of Furness and Lawrence, the son of Thomas De Lancaster.

During the course of the 18th century, three charities arose in connection with the settlement of Skerton...and that two of them should be geared towards the endowment of education. A school is known to have existed in Skerton since 1734, (making Skerton the second-oldest provider of education in Lancaster, after the establishment of the Lancaster Royal Grammar School in 1235, some five hundred years earlier), when the trust deed of one Jane Jepson, (dated 25 March 1734), confirmed that £100 was delivered into the hands of John Housman for the fulfilment of a number of purposes; particularly, that £60 should be earmarked for either the purchase of construction of a schoolhouse, and that any remainder or surplus should be lent out at interest...and the return from this latter investment used to employ a schoolmaster for the teaching of poor children.

A later endowment came in the form of Henry Williamson's trust deed, (dated 10 February 1767), when he bequeathed £100 to be used for investments that would yield a sufficient rate of return: "...towards teaching young children belonging to the township to read the Bible, write, knit or sew, and if any overplus should be, that the same should be laid out in clothing such children as would be indigent".

Intervening between these two noble patronages, we are also aware of an apparently-anonymous endowment, referred to only as 'Money's Charity'...which, (we learn from Cross Fleury's 1891 history of Lancaster), had emerged under an indenture dated 13 December 1760, (in recitation of an earlier indenture of mortgage, dating from 2 November 1750), whereby 'two messuages and a garden situate in Skerton', had been mortgaged to James Rigmaiden and Peter Cook, (referred to in contemporary documentation as 'Sidesmen' of the parish), as trustees on behalf of the residents of Skerton in the interests of securing support for those poor inhabitants of the same, requiring relief...as per agreement between the aforesaid trustees and John Money, who undertook to demise same premises in pursuance thereof, for a period of one thousand years.

Whilst the archaic language of 18th century land-conveyances and trust deeds would appear to ensure that much of this complex arrangement remains incomprehensible to the modern reader, it is with the careful paraphrasing of Cross Fleury that we are able to determine that the 'Money's Charity' thus primarily entailed the effective transfer of four dwellinghouses and a cattleshed to the care of the parish of Skerton; with a view to the sub-leasing of the same and the use of the rents therefrom, in relief of the poor.

In the intervening years leading up to incorporation of the township of Skerton in 1888, we read of the two 'National Schools' attached to the parish church of St Luke, brought under government inspection following the Elementary Education Act 1870, and enlarged in 1877 at the cost of around £900; with a subsequent annuity of £27 paid from the endowment of the historic Williamson and Jepson Charities. At that time administered by the Vicar and Church Wardens of St Luke's Church, as named trustees.

The 1888 Incorporation of Skerton as a township brought with it a flurry of new buildings inclined towards the civic advancement of the people. A new county police station was completed in 1889 and still stands today on Owen Road. Referred to by Cross Fleury in 1891 as having cost £5,000.

Tramways are also known to have run through Skerton; served by the Lancaster Corporation Tramways, which were in operation from 14 January 1903, until 4 April 1930 when services ceased. As around 3 miles of tramline are known to have been laid down and mention is made in contemporary sources dating from 1914 of a route having passed through Skerton on its way to Morecambe.

Skerton was formerly a township and chapelry in the parish of Lancaster, in 1866 Skerton became a separate civil parish, on 9 November 1900 the parish was abolished and merged with Lancaster and Heaton with Oxcliffe. In 1891 the parish had a population of 311. It is now in the unparished area of Lancaster.
