= Lancaster power stations =

Former power stations in Lancaster, England

- Country: United Kingdom
- Location: Lancaster Lancashire
- Coordinates: 54°04′03″N 02°47′19″W
- Status: Decommissioned and demolished
- Construction began: 1892, 1915
- Commission date: 1894, 1916
- Decommission date: 1976
- Owners: Lancaster Corporation (1892–1948); Ministry of Munitions, Cator Road (1916–1921); British Electricity Authority (1948–1955); Central Electricity Authority (1955–1957); Central Electricity Generating Board (1958–1976)
- Operator: As owner

Thermal power station
- Primary fuel: Coal
- Turbine technology: Steam turbine (and reciprocating engines prior to 1910)
- Chimneys: 1
- Cooling towers: None
- Cooling source: river water

Power generation
- Units operational: 2 × 20.8 MW (largest sets)
- Make and model: Metropolitan Vickers
- Units decommissioned: All
- Nameplate capacity: 50.25 MW (1958)
- Annual net output: 217.15 GWh (1963)

The Lancaster power stations provided electricity to the Lancashire town and city of Lancaster and the surrounding area from 1894 to 1976. The first power station was built and operated by Lancaster Corporation and started generating electricity in April 1894. The second power station was built during the First World War near the Lune Aqueduct to provide electric power for a munitions factory. When the factory closed after the war the power station was purchased by the corporation to provide electric power throughout its supply area.

== History ==
In 1890 Lancaster Corporation applied for, and the Board of Trade granted, a provisional order to generate and supply electricity to the town of Lancaster, Lancashire. This Lancaster Electric Lighting Order 1890 was confirmed by Parliament in the Electric Lighting Orders (No. 2) Act 1890 (54 & 55 Vict. c. clxxxvii). The corporation electricity undertaking constructed a power station with a generating capacity of 240 kW. The generating equipment comprised steam driven Willans engines coupled directly to Brush direct current dynamos. The supply of electricity commenced on 14 April 1894. In the year ending March 1898 the station supplied a total of 147.175 MWh powering 12,256 lamps (each of 8 candle-power). The maximum load on the system was 190 kW. By 1901 supply had increased to 440 kW and a new station was erected alongside the original one containing a 1,000kW generator. This then allowed a supply of electricity to the Lancaster tram system commencing in 1903.

In 1912 the cost of coal had increased significantly, Lancaster Corporation claimed it had increased by 25 per cent since 1911, the corporation investigated the possibility of using hydro-power from the River Lune to generate electricity. Chester Corporation had recently installed a hydro-electric station on the River Dee. In 1923 the plant at Chester comprised 1 × 185 kW and 2 × 225 kW hydro-electric machines. Nothing became of the proposal for Lancaster.

== Caton Road station ==
At the outbreak of the First World War a National Projectile Factory was established off of Caton Road adjacent to the River Lune and the Lune Aqueduct. Construction started in September 1915 and the factory was operational from November 1916. The 33 acre (13.3 hectare) site included an electricity generating station at the east end (54°04′02.6″N 2°47′19.0″W). Cooling water for the steam condensers was abstracted from the River Lune. The munitions factory closed down in 1922 and Lancaster Corporation purchased the power station to increase the electricity supplies to Lancaster.

By 1923 the steam plant at the station had a capacity of 26,000 lb/h (3.28 kg/s) and supplied steam to:

- 1 × 100 kW steam turbine driven generator
- 2 × 225 kW steam turbine driven generators
- 2 × 200 kW reciprocating engine driven generators
- 2 × 300 kW steam turbines driven generator

These provided a total generating capacity of 1,550 kW.

The station supplied only direct current (DC) at 460 and 230 Volts. In 1923 the maximum load on the system was 910 kW, and there was a connected load of 3,122 kW. The power was sold to the following users:

Lancaster power electricity sold 1921–3
User	Usage MWh		
User	1921	1922	1923
Lighting and domestic	346.45	340.02	406.90
Public lighting	66.80	58.10	65.00
Traction	281.75	128.00	268.34
Power	365.31	539.76	413.07
Total	1060.3	1065.87	1153.31

Traction current was supplied to the Lancaster tramway system.

The sale of electricity provided an income to the corporation of £21,747 in 1923. The surplus of revenue over expenses for generating electricity was £6,280.

=== Low pressure station ===
The plant installed from the inauguration of the power station in 1916 until 1928 became known as the low pressure (LP) station and comprised:

- Boilers
  - 2 × Stirling 55,000 lb/h (6.93 kg/s) of steam, coal-fired boilers, supplying steam at 210 psi at 610 °F (14.5 bar at 321 °C)
  - 4 × Stirling 15,000 lb/h (1.89 kg/s) coal-fired boilers, 210 psi at 610 °F (14.5 bar at 321 °C)
- These gave a total steam evaporative capacity of 170,000 lb/h (21.42 kg/s).
- Generating plant
  - 1 × 5.0 MW Metropolitan-Vickers turbo-alternator operating at 6.66 kV
  - 1 × 2.1 MW Metropolitan-Vickers turbo-alternator operating at 6.66 kV
  - 1 × 1.1 MW Metropolitan-Vickers turbo-alternator operating at 6.66 kV
  - 2 × 225 kW Greenwood & Batley turbo-generators operating at 460 V DC.

The power station had three railway sidings off the Settle Junction & Morecambe Line (London, Midland and Scottish Railway) for the supply of coal to the station.

=== National Grid ===
Under the terms of the Electricity (Supply) Act 1926 (16 & 17 Geo. 5. c. 51) the Central Electricity Board (CEB) was established. The CEB identified high efficiency ‘selected’ power station that would supply electricity most effectively; Lancaster became a selected station. The CEB also constructed the National Grid (1927–33) to connect power stations within a region. Lancaster was a node on the major north–south line from Kilmarnock in Scotland to Carlisle, Lancaster, Stoke-on-Trent, Bristol and Hayle Cornwall. The connection in Lancaster was at a 132 kV grid substation that was built south east of the Caton Road power station.

=== High pressure station ===
Demand for electricity increased – nationally from 9,169 GWh in 1930 to 24,263 GWh in 1940 – and a high pressure (HP) station was commissioned at Lancaster power station in 1942 and comprised:

- Boilers
  - 2 × 205,000 lb/h Stirling (2 × 25.83 kg/s) coal-fired boilers operating at a steam pressure of 430 psi and 830 °F (29.7 bar and 443 °C).
- Generators
  - 2 × 20.8 MW Metropolitan-Vickers turbo-alternators operating at 6.6 kV.

=== Nationalisation ===
Upon nationalisation of the British electricity supply industry in 1948 under the provisions of the Electricity Act 1947 (10 & 11 Geo. 6. c. 54), the Lancaster electricity undertaking was abolished, ownership of Lancaster power station was vested in the British Electricity Authority, and subsequently the Central Electricity Authority and the Central Electricity Generating Board (CEGB). At the same time the electricity distribution and sales responsibilities of the Lancaster electricity undertaking were transferred to the North Western Electricity Board (NORWEB).

The total installed plant capacity at Lancaster power station in the mid-1950s was 50.25 MW.

Operating details of the station were as follows:

Lancaster power station operations 1954–72
Year	Running hours (or load factor %)	Output capacity MW	Electricity supplied GWh	Thermal efficiency %
1946	(54.0 %)		226.85	22.79
1954	6373	49	151.86	22.29
1955	5688	49	133.46	22.52
1956	5085	48	119.80	23.14
1957	4114	47	92.52	22.72
1958	4596	47	109.50	23.13
1961	32.6 %	47	134.22	23.31
1962	37.0 %	47	152.42	23.46
1963	52.74 %	47	217.15	23.79
1967	(45.9 %)	46	184.95	24.05
1972	31.6 %	39	108.16	23.58

In 1958 the Lancaster electricity district supplied an area of 235 square miles and a population of 104,220. The amount of electricity sold and the number and types of consumers was as follows:

Year	Electricity sold, MWh	No. of consumers
1956	369,104	33,822
1957	380,810	34,660
1958	392,720	35,433

In 1958 the above totals were made up of the following:

Type of Consumer	No. of consumers	Electricity sold, MWh
Domestic	29,857	57,950
Commercial	3,942	25,859
Combined premises	520	4,643
Farms	966	7,626
Industrial	138	293,912
Public lighting	9	1,416
Public traction	1	1,314
Total	35,433	392,710

== Closure ==
Lancaster power station closed on 25 October 1976. The buildings were subsequently demolished. The site is now occupied by commercial and industrial units.

The 132 kV substation to the east of the site remains operational. The substation has a 132 kV connection to Heysham Nuclear power station.

== See also ==
- Timeline of the UK electricity supply industry
- List of power stations in England
- Ribble power station
- Heysham nuclear power station
