= Edward Jackson (cricketer, born 1849) =

English cricketer (1849–1926)

Edward Jackson (17 March 1849 – 24 November 1926) was an English cricketer active from 1860 to 1874 who played for Lancashire. He was born in Lancaster and died in Overton-on-Dee, Flintshire. He appeared in 15 first-class matches as a righthanded batsman and wicketkeeper. He scored 105 runs with a highest score of 11 and held 21 catches with 14 stumpings.
