= Grand Theatre, Lancaster =

Theatre in Lancaster, England

The Grand Theatre, Lancaster
- The Theatre, Theatre Royal, Music Hall, Athenaeum, Athenaeum Theatre
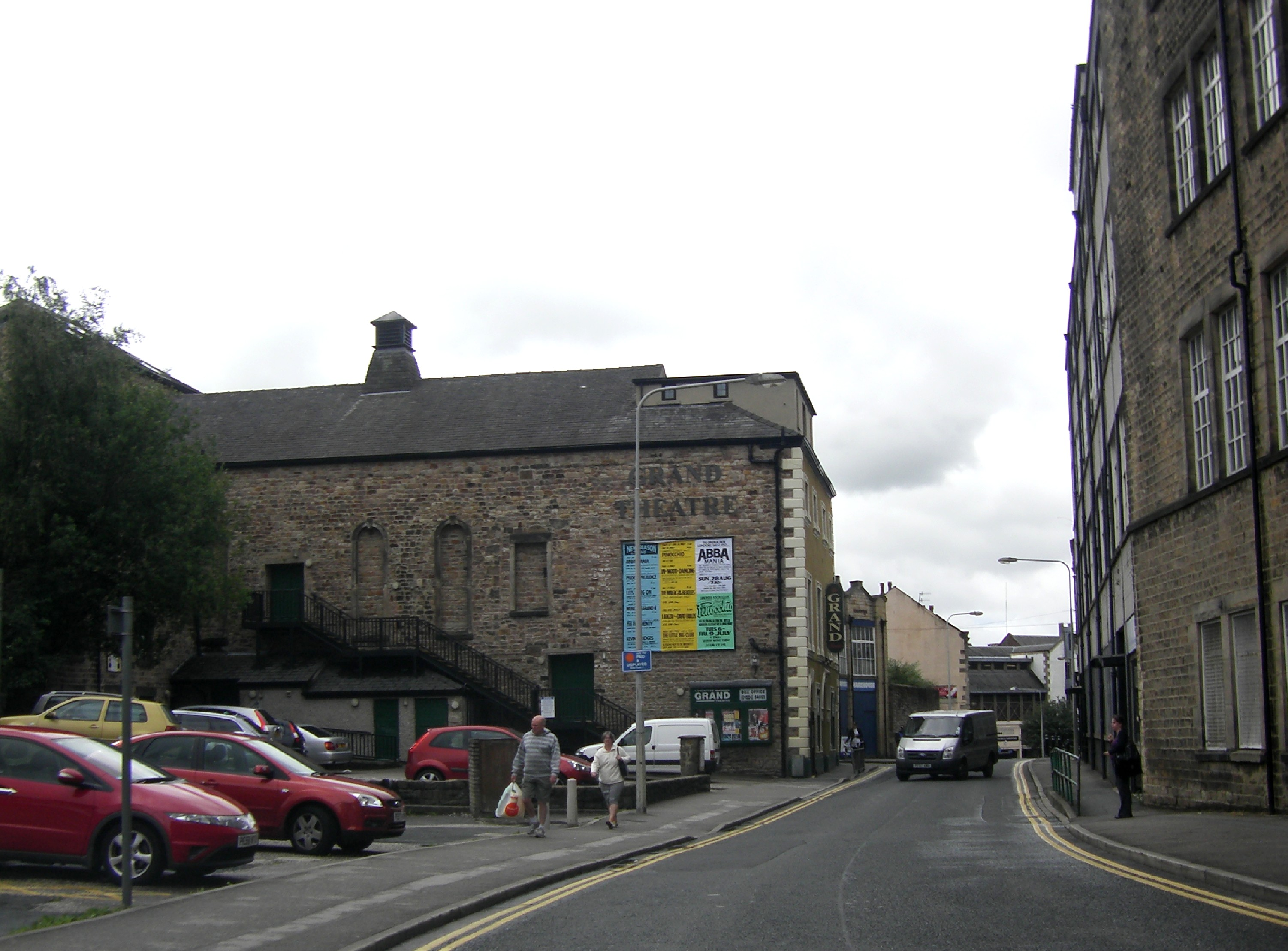

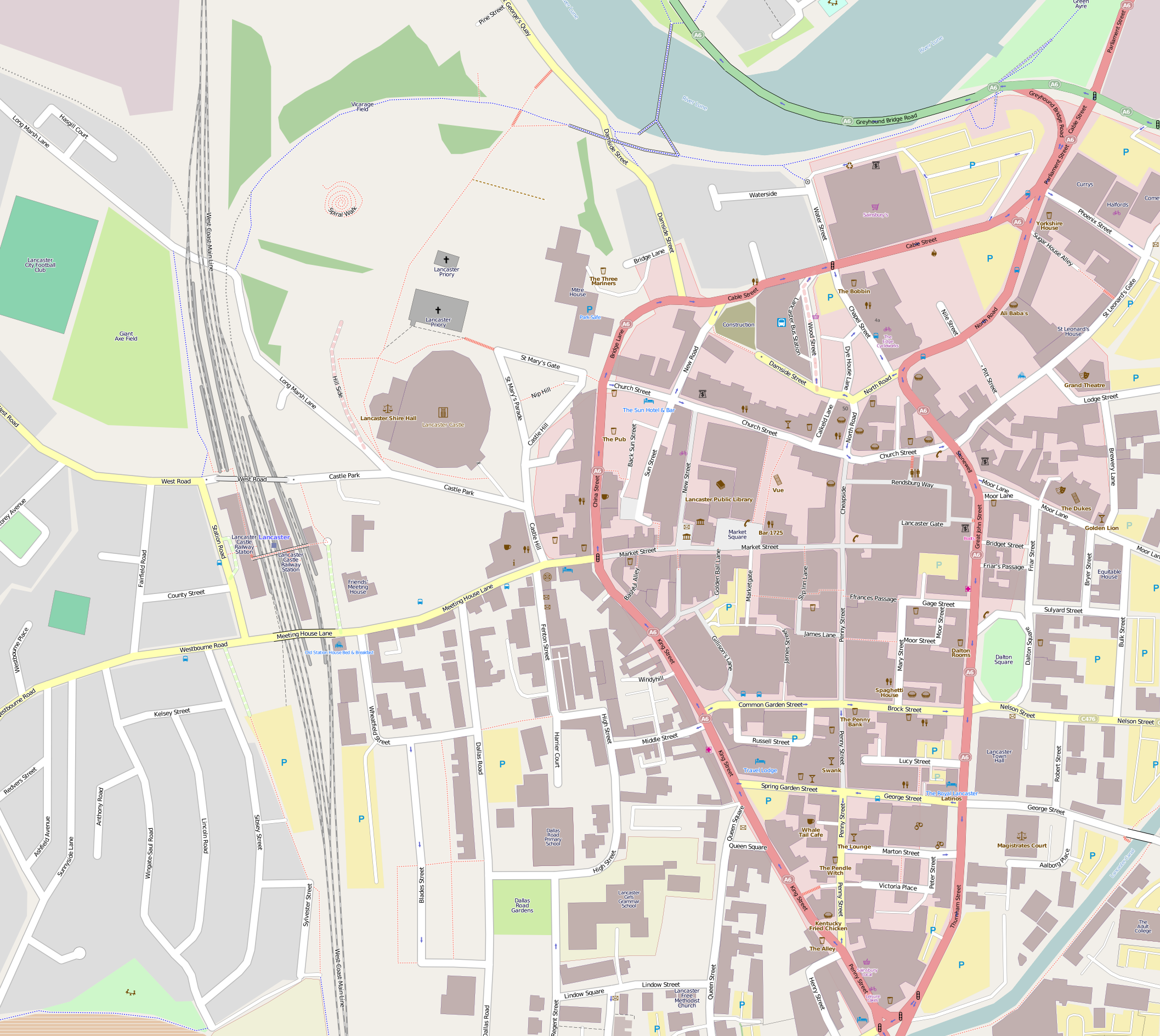
- Location in Lancaster
- Address: St Leonardgate; Lancaster; LA1 1NL; Lancaster; England
- Coordinates: 54.0502°N 2.7967°W
- Owner: Lancaster Footlights; Registered charity no 509425
- Capacity: 457
- Current use: Professional and amateur theatre

Construction
- Opened: 1782
- Rebuilt: 1848, 1857, 1884, (interior) 1908, 1978

Website
- www.LancasterGrand.co.uk

Listed Building – Grade II
- Official name: Grand Theatre
- Designated: 9 July 1974
- Reference no.: 1195050

The Grand Theatre in Lancaster, England is one of the oldest theatres in England and the third oldest in Britain, having been in near continuous use since 1782. Though it has seen numerous extensions and alterations, much of the original stone has survived. The theatre is recorded in the National Heritage List for England as a designated Grade II listed building.

Prior to its construction, theatrical performances were held in barns and inns in Lancaster as early as the 1760s. for example during the summer of 1777, the play The Orphan of China by Arthur Murphy was performed in one of these temporary theatres.

The theatre was built in 1781, becoming one of the first permanent theatres in Britain. The theatre was opened in June 1782, by Joseph Austin (an actor) and Charles Edward Whitlock (a dentist), who managed a circuit of theatres across the north of England. It was known simply as "The Theatre, Lancaster".

In that first summer, the plays Hamlet and The Belle's Stratagem were performed at the theatre, and received good reviews. In 1795, Macbeth was performed, and playing Lady Macbeth was Sarah Siddons, who was the sister-in-law of Whitlock. Other performers included Edmund Kean, Joseph Grimaldi and Ira Aldridge, the first black actor to appear in the UK. In September 1833 Italian violinist Niccolò Paganini played at the theatre. By the end of the 1830s, the theatre was less used for performances, and increasingly used for meetings of the Temperance society and for formal lectures. In 1843 Edmund Sharpe bought the theatre, and after an extension and alteration, he reopened it in 1849 as a music hall as well as a museum for the local Literary and Natural History Society. By 1860 it was owned and operated by a private company called the Lancaster Athenaeum, which Sharpe founded. Charles Dickens appeared twice in the 1860s.

The theatre was closed in 1882. In May 1884, the theatre found a new owner, Henry Wilkinson, who had the building altered, and it was re-opened as the Athenaeum Theatre. In 1897 the theatre was modified again, including a new stage, by architect Frank Matcham.

The work of Matcham was lost when the building was badly damaged by fire in 1908. With the interior rebuilt in the same year (the new design by architect Albert Winstanley), it re-opened as The Grand Theatre. Theatre tours are offered monthly.

The Grand Theatre seats 457 on two levels. It is owned by the Lancaster Footlights who started performing in the 1920s and bought the Grand Theatre in 1951 to save it from demolition. The Grand Theatre plays host to amateur and professional shows. There are plans for a major extension on the east side of the building; the New Foyer will provide a new reception, foyer and bar space, rehearsal and studio theatre.

== See also ==
- Listed buildings in Lancaster, Lancashire
