= Herbert Hampton =

British sculptor and artist (1862–1929)

Herbert Hampton (1862 – 11 February 1929) was an English sculptor, artist, and creator of public memorials, who was active between 1888 and 1927.

== Life ==
Hampton was born at Hoddesdon, Hertfordshire, and died in Great Bardfield, Essex in 1929. After education at Bishop's Stortford College, he studied art at the Cardiff School of Art, the Lambeth, the Westminster, the Slade and then the Académies Julian and Colarossi in Paris. His legacy was a collection of public memorials across the United Kingdom and New Zealand.

== Works ==
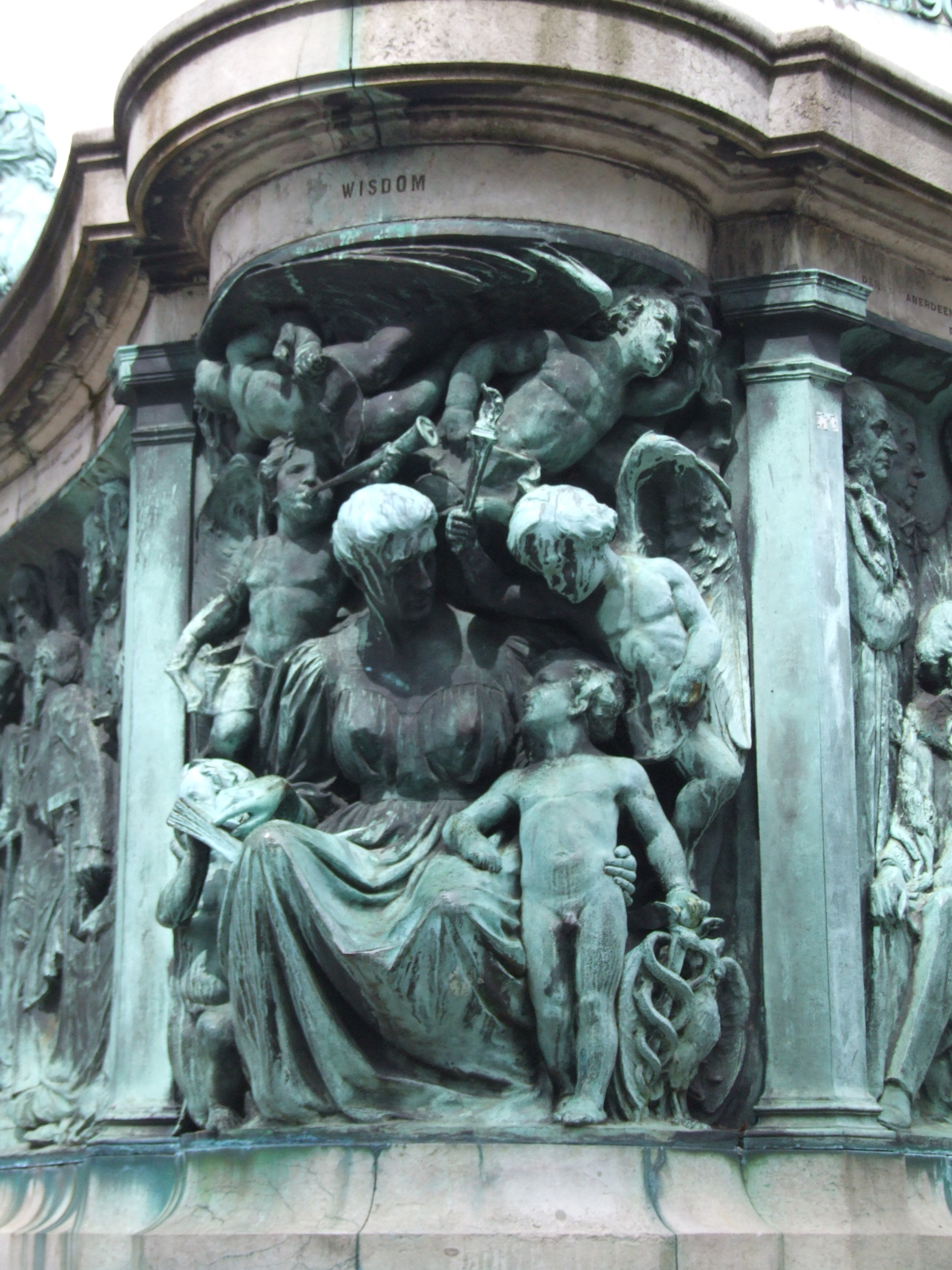
Figure of Wisdom on the Queen Victoria Memorial, Dalton Square, Lancaster

The Queen Victoria Monument in Lancaster, displays a sculpture of the queen guarded by four monumental lions, beneath them are four allegories to freedom, wisdom, truth and justice complete with a generous collection of putti; and four bas-relief friezes of fifty-three eminent Victorians, two of whom were women.

- Queen Victoria Monument, Dalton Square, Lancaster, England.
- Ashton Memorial, Williamson Park, Lancaster, England
- Statue of the Duke of Devonshire, Whitehall, London
- Queen Victoria Memorial Statue (1905), Queens Gardens, Dunedin, New Zealand.
- Henry Austin Bruce, Lord Aberdare (1899), New Promenade, Aberystwyth, Wales
- Henry Austin Bruce, Lord Aberdare (1899), Alexandra Gardens, Cardiff, Wales

== Sources ==
- Pevsner, Nikolaus (2009). Lancashire: North: the buildings of England. Yale University Press. p. 381.
- Glasgow, University of. "'Herbert Hampton', Mapping the Practice and Profession of Sculpture in Britain and Ireland 1851–1951, University of Glasgow History of Art and HATII, online database 2011". Archived from the original on 3 March 2015.
