= Queen Victoria Memorial, Lancaster =

Memorial in Lancashire, England

Queen Victoria Memorial
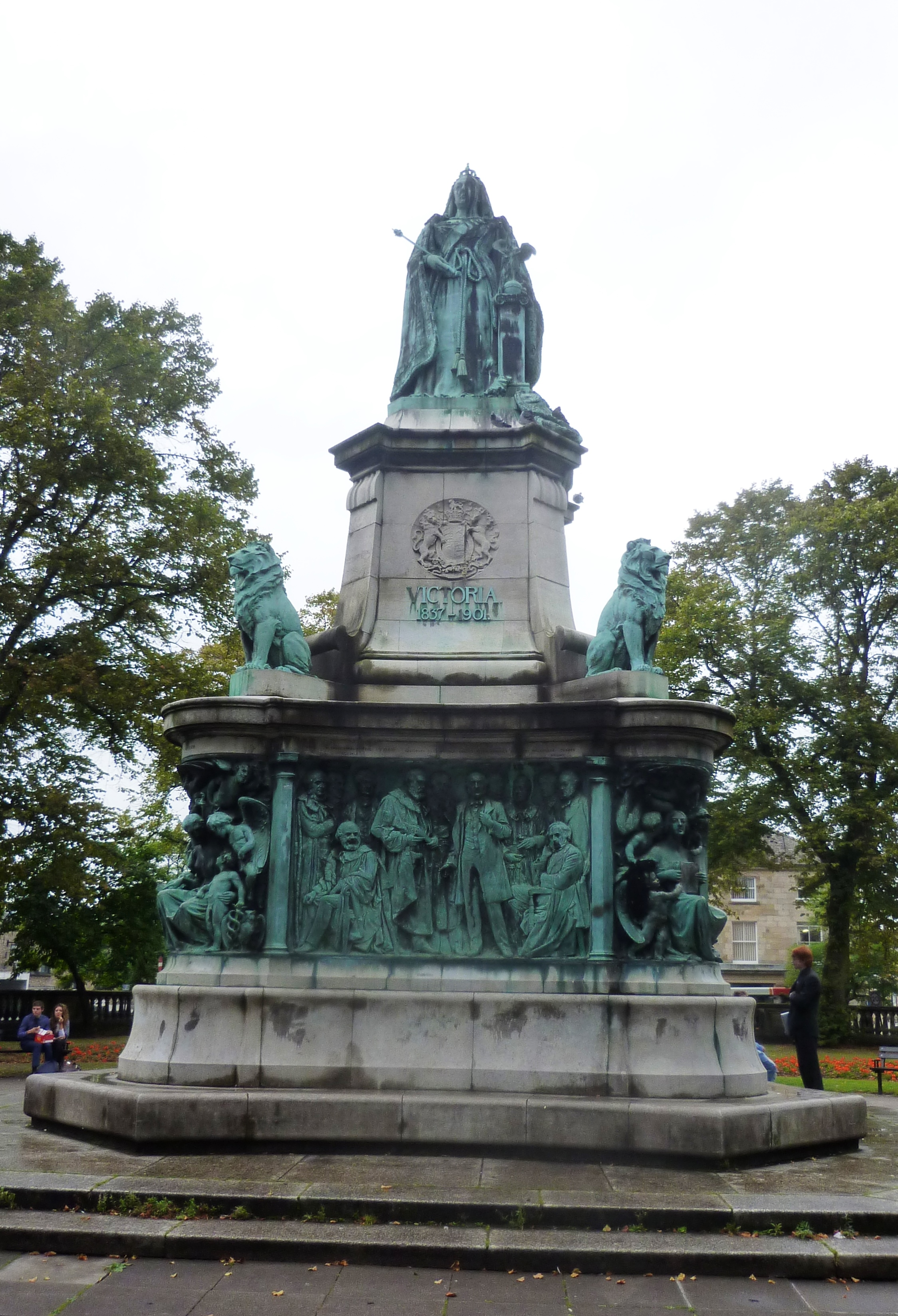
- South aspect
- Interactive map of Queen Victoria Memorial
- Location: Dalton Square, Lancaster, Lancashire, England
- Coordinates: 54.0478°N 2.7977°W
- Designer: Herbert Hampton
- Type: Monument
- Material: Stone and bronze
- Opening date: 1906
- Dedicated to: "Given to his native town by Lord Ashton"

Listed Building – Grade II*
- Official name: Queen Victoria Memorial
- Designated: 18 February 1970
- Reference no.: 1290440

The Queen Victoria Memorial in Lancaster, Lancashire, England, is a Grade II* listed building. It stands in the centre of Dalton Square, facing Lancaster Town Hall. It was erected in 1906, being commissioned and paid for by James Williamson, 1st Baron Ashton.

The monument was designed by Herbert Hampton (1862–1929), a prolific sculptor and stone carver who also designed the exterior of the Ashton Memorial in Lancaster.

== Description ==
The memorial is of Portland stone with bronze sculpture. A statue of Queen Victoria stands on a tall pedestal facing south, "looking a little pensively over the square," according to Nikolaus Pevsner.

The pedestal sits on a tall square plinth with rounded corners accompanied by four bronze lions at the ordinal points. Around the plinth is an unbroken bas relief frieze of bronze. At the corners, facing ordinal points, are four figurative sculptures, each depicting an allegory of Freedom (northeast), Truth (southeast), Wisdom (southwest) and Justice (northwest). On the four cardinal faces are near life size likenesses of fifty three prominent British figures from the Victorian era. Of the fifty three persons depicted upon the plinth of the Queen Victoria Monument only two are women: George Eliot and Florence Nightingale. Five of those depicted were born in Lancaster or the surrounding area: William Turner, Edward Frankland, Richard Owen, William Whewell, James Williamson, 1st Baron Ashton.

At the time of construction, of the people featured on the monument, six were still alive: William Turner, Luke Fildes, Joseph Lister, 1st Baron Lister, William Thomson, 1st Baron Kelvin, Florence Nightingale and James Williamson, 1st Baron Ashton himself, the author of the monument. Amongst the people of Lancaster, the monument is also known as "King Victoria", because of the shape of the silhouette against the western sky at dusk.

== Gallery ==
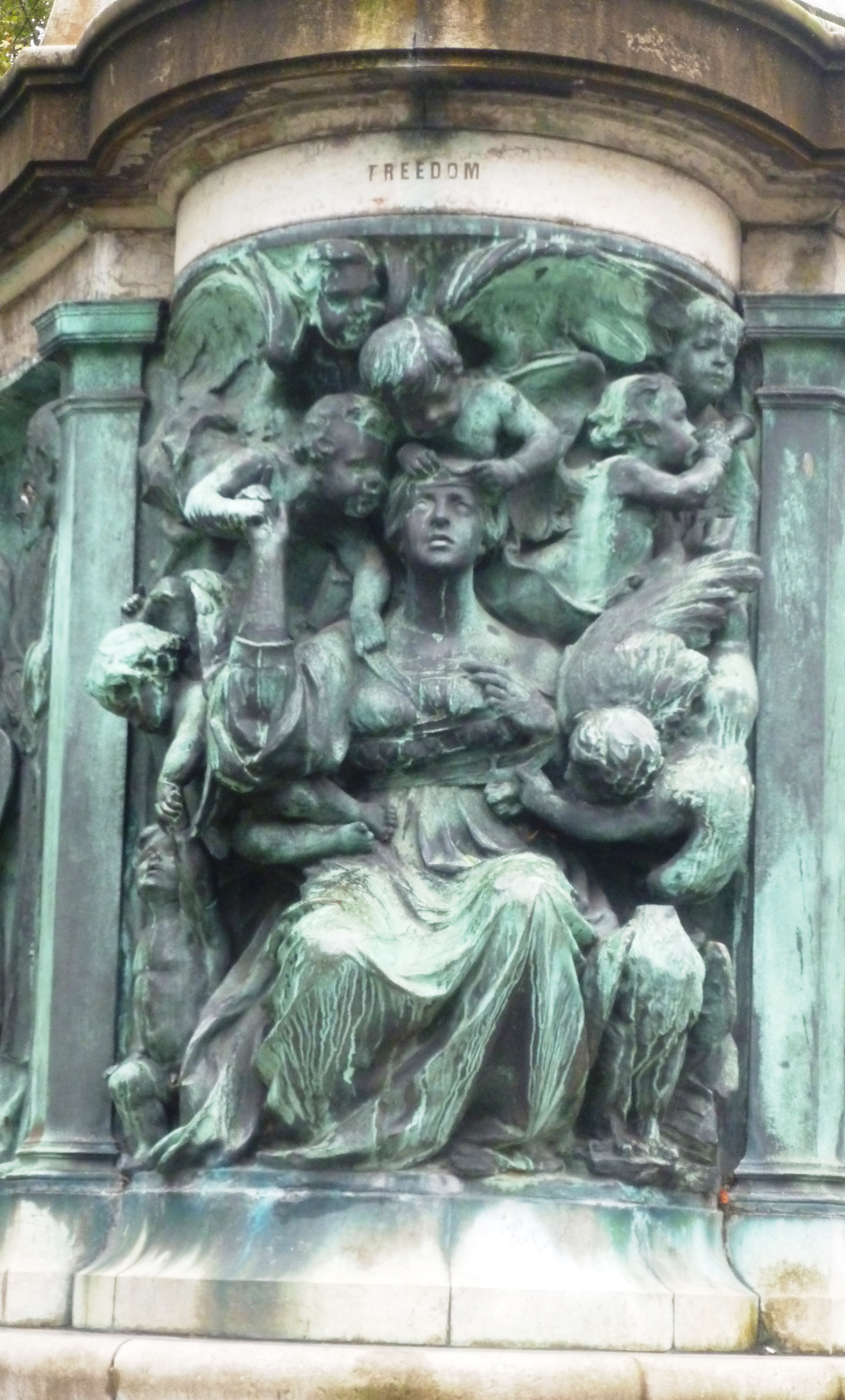
Allegory of "freedom" depicted on the NE corner

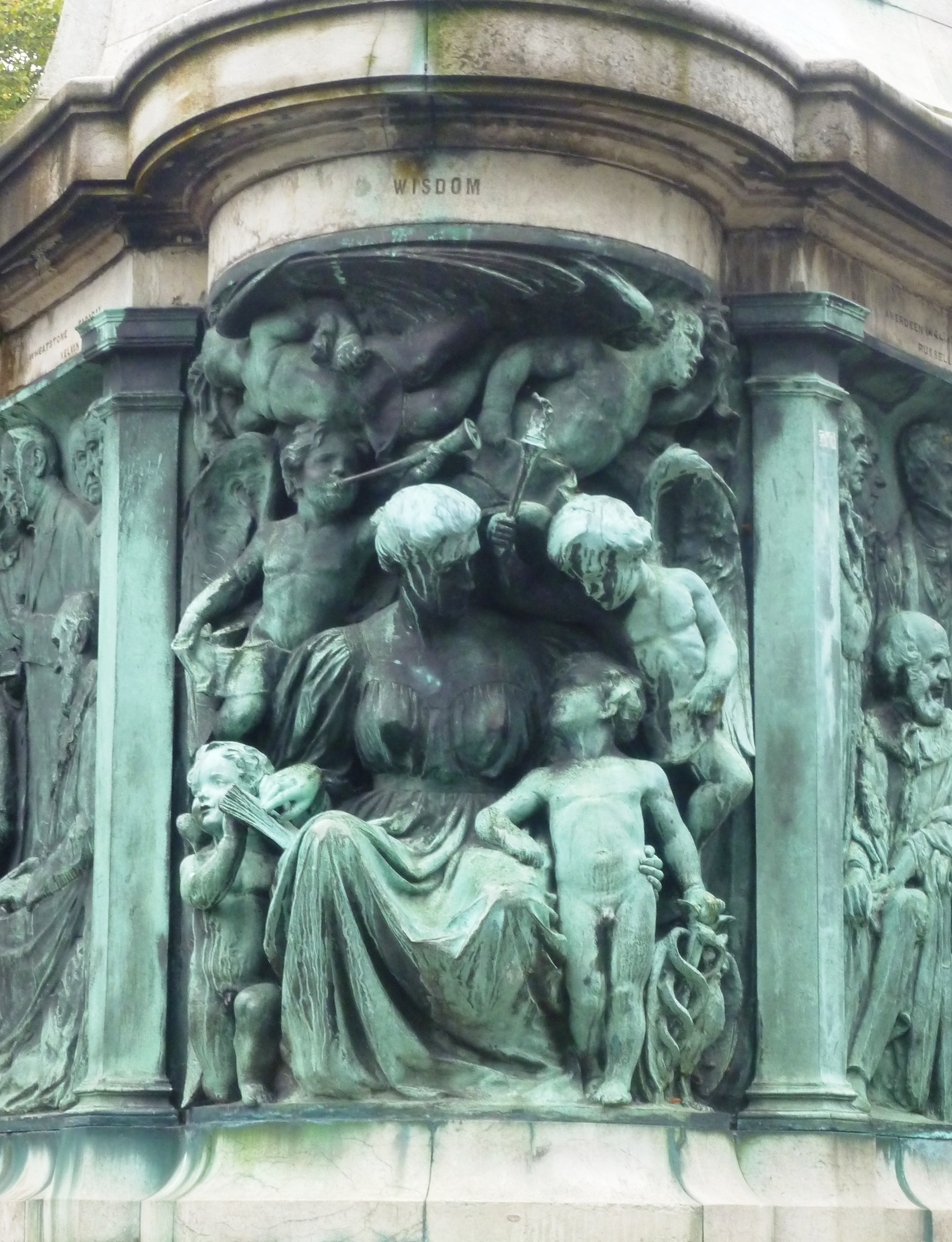
Allegory of "wisdom" depicted on the SW corner

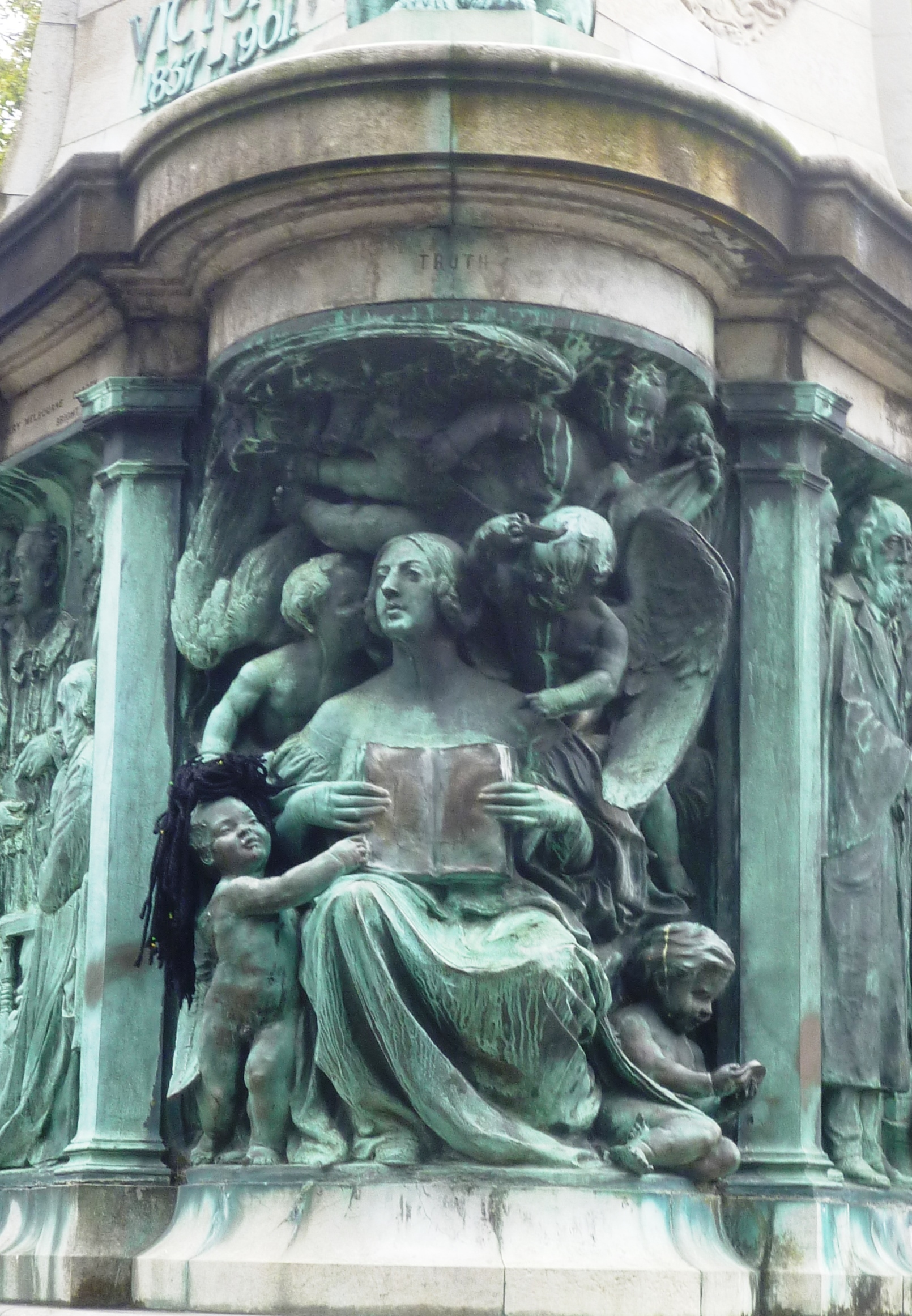
Allegory of "truth" depicted on the SE corner

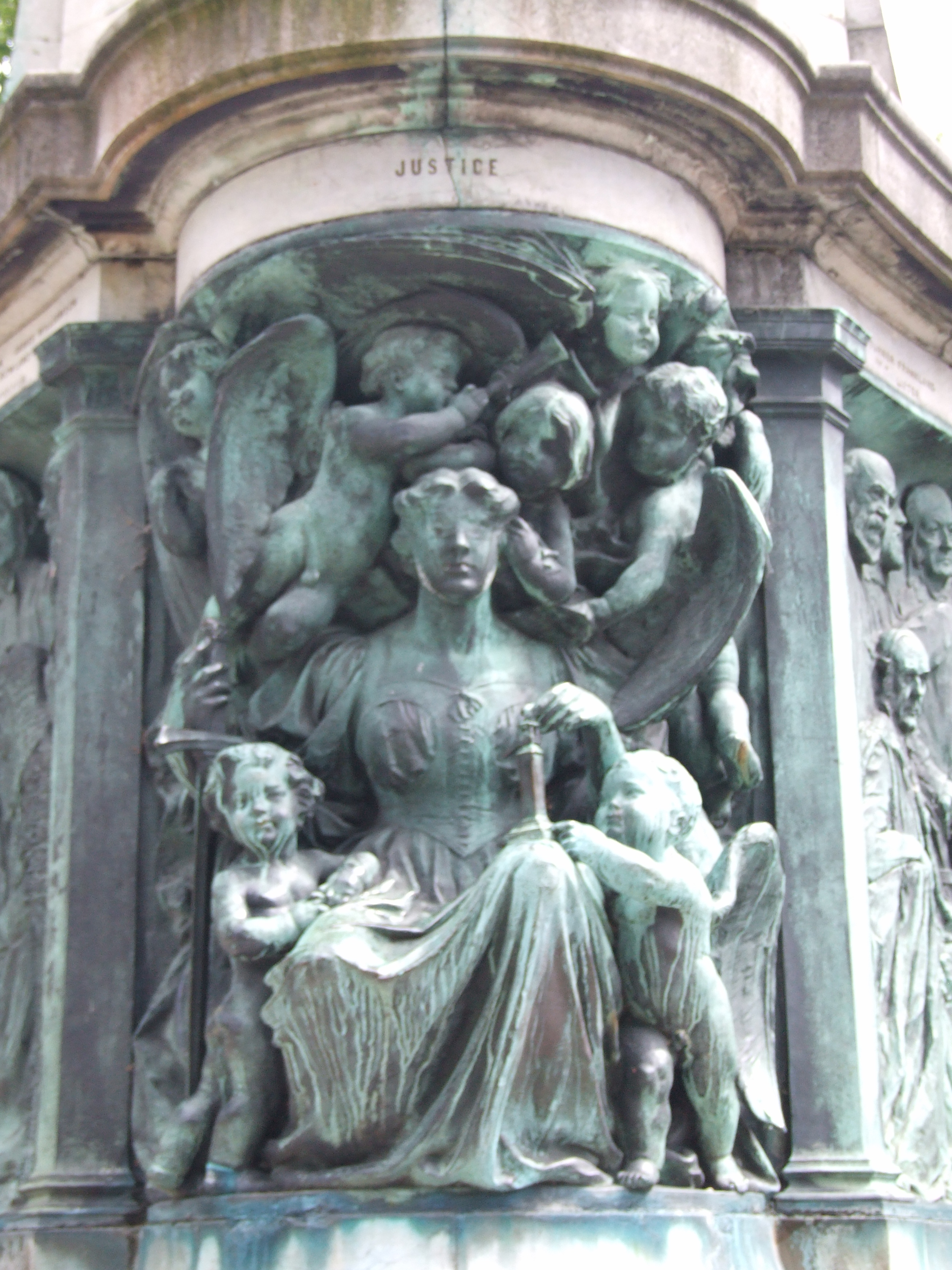
Allegory of "justice" depicted on the NW corner

=== East frieze ===
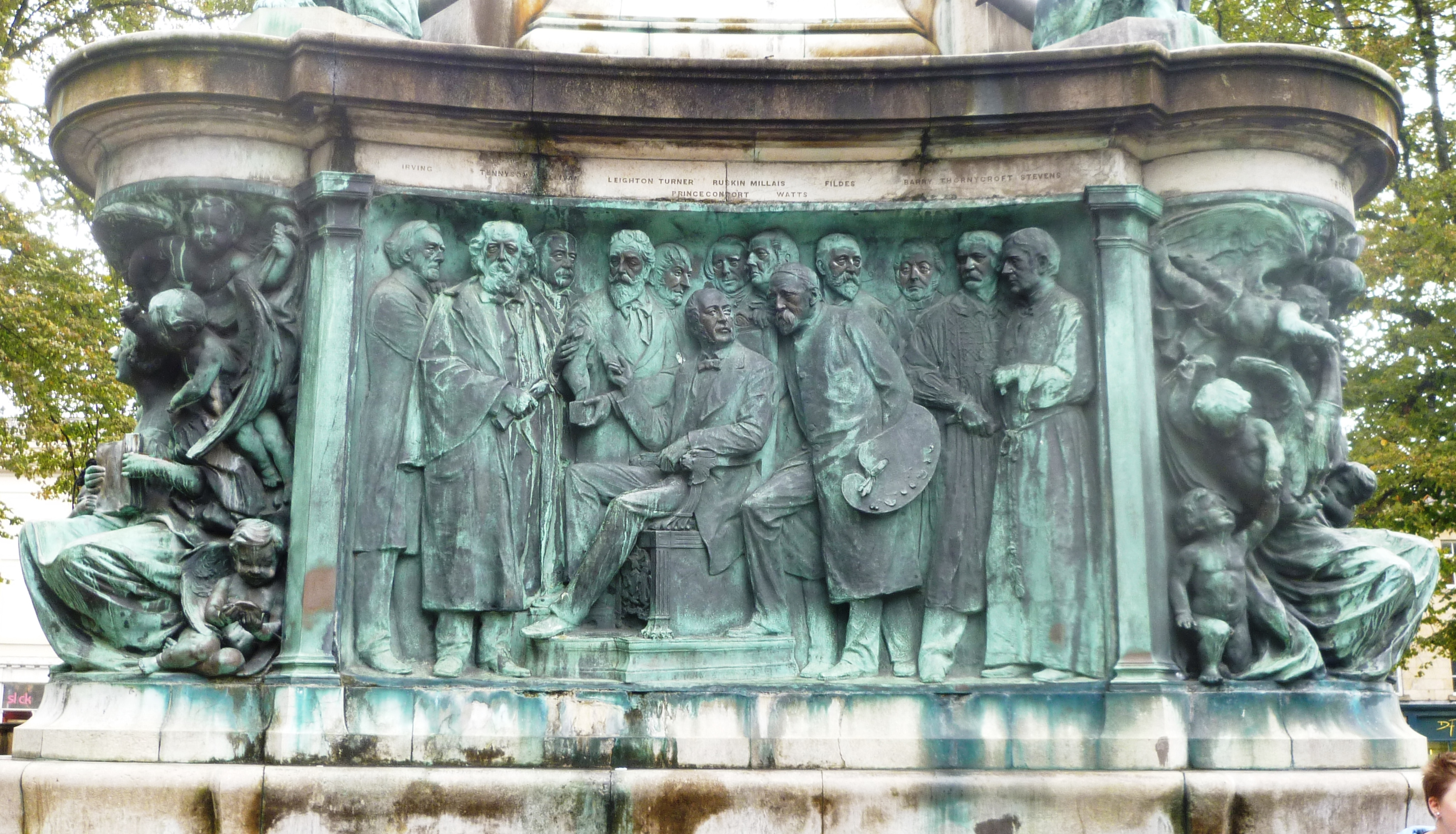
East frieze

The frieze on the east face of the monument depicts thirteen prominent Victorians from the fields of arts and culture. They are, from left to right:

- "Irving" is Sir Henry Irving (real name John Henry Brodribb) (1838–1905), actor
- "Tennyson" is Alfred, Lord Tennyson, first Baron Tennyson (1809–1892), poet
- "Sullivan" is Sir Arthur Sullivan (1842–1900), composer and conductor
- "Leighton" is Frederic Leighton, 1st Baron Leighton (1830–1896), painter
- "Turner" is Joseph Mallord William J. M. W. Turner (1775–1851), painter
- "Prince Consort" is Albert, Prince Consort Prince Albert of Saxe-Coburg and Gotha (1819–1861), consort of Queen Victoria
- "Ruskin" is John Ruskin (1819–1900), art critic and social critic
- "Millais" is Sir John Everett Millais, first baronet (1829–1896), painter
- "Watts" is George Frederic Watts (1817–1904), painter and sculptor
- "Fildes" is Sir (Samuel) Luke Fildes (1843–1927), illustrator and painter
- "Barry" is Edward Middleton Barry (1830–1880), architect
- "Thornycroft" is Thomas Thornycroft (1815–1885), sculptor
- "Stevens" is Alfred Stevens (1817–1875), sculptor and designer

=== South frieze ===
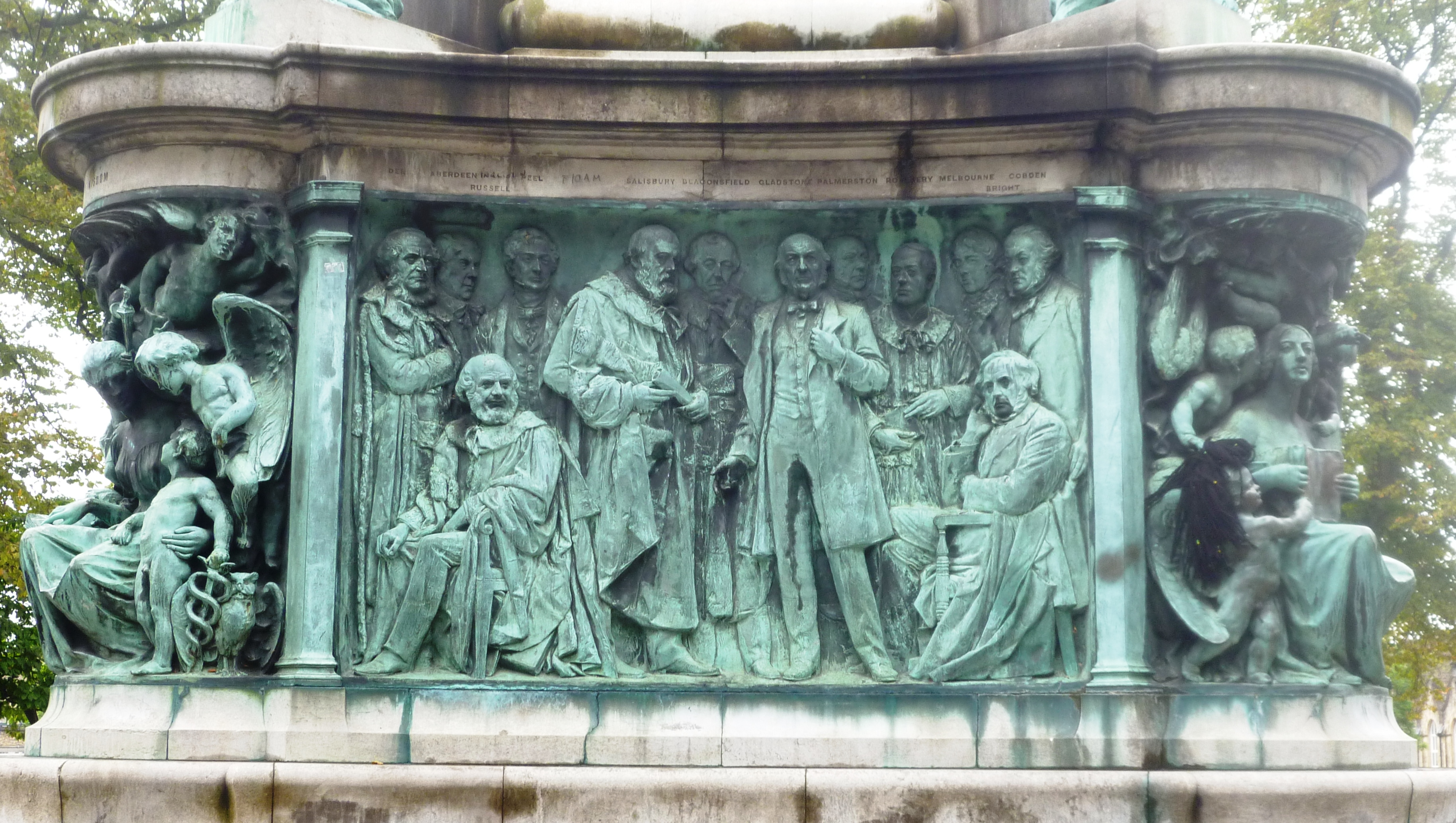
South frieze

The frieze on the south face of the monument depicts twelve Victorian politicians and statesmen. They are, from left to right:

- "Derby" is Edward Smith-Stanley, 14th Earl of Derby (1799–1869), prime minister
- "Aberdeen" is George Hamilton-Gordon, 4th Earl of Aberdeen (1784–1860), prime minister
- "Russell" is John Russell, 1st Earl Russell John Russell, first Earl Russell (1792–1878), prime minister and author
- "Peel" is Sir Robert Peel, 2nd Baronet (1788–1850), prime minister
- "Salisbury" is Robert Gascoyne-Cecil, 3rd Marquess of Salisbury (1830–1903), prime minister
- "Beaconsfield" is Benjamin Disraeli, 1st Earl of Beaconsfield (1804–1881), prime minister and novelist
- "Gladstone" is William Ewart Gladstone (1809–1898), prime minister and author
- "Palmerston" is Henry John Temple, 3rd Viscount Palmerston (1784–1865), prime minister
- "Rosebery" is Archibald Primrose, 5th Earl of Rosebery (1847–1929), prime minister
- "Melbourne" is William Lamb, 2nd Viscount Melbourne (1779–1848), prime minister
- "Bright" is John Bright (1811–1889), politician
- "Cobden" is Richard Cobden (1804–1865), manufacturer and politician

=== West frieze ===
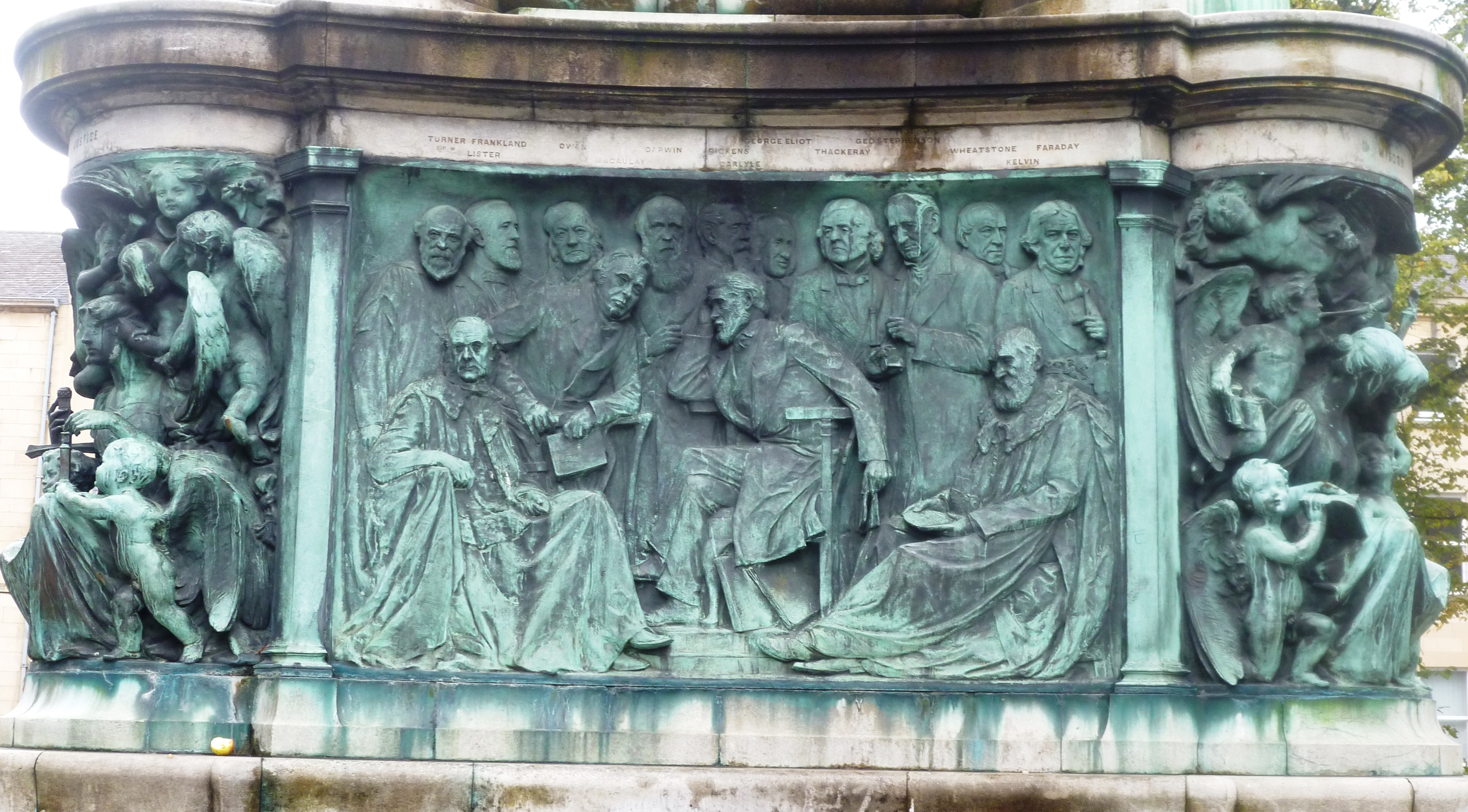
West frieze

The frieze on the west face of the monument depicts fourteen Victorian scientists and writers. They are, from left to right:

- "Turner sir W" is Sir William Turner(1832–1916), anatomist and university administrator
- "Lister" is Joseph Lister, 1st Baron Lister (1827–1912), surgeon and founder of a system of antiseptic surgery
- "Frankland" is Sir Edward Frankland (1825–1899), chemist
- "Owen" is Sir Richard Owen (1804–1892), comparative anatomist and palaeontologist
- "Macaulay" is Thomas Babington Macaulay, 1st Baron Macaulay (1800–1859), historian, essayist, and poet
- "Darwin" is Charles Darwin (1809–1882), naturalist, geologist, and originator of the theory of natural selection
- "Dickens" is Charles Dickens (1812–1870), novelist
- "Carlyle" is Thomas Carlyle (1795–1881), author, biographer, and historian
- "George Eliot" is George Eliot (pseudonym) Marian Evans (pseudonym) (1819–1880), novelist
- "Thackeray" is William Makepeace Thackeray (1811–1863), novelist
- "Geo Stephenson" is George Stephenson (1781–1848), civil engineer
- "Wheatstone" is Sir Charles Wheatstone (1802–1875), developer of telegraphy
- "Kelvin" is William Thomson, 1st Baron Kelvin (1824–1907), mathematician and physicist
- "Faraday" is Michael Faraday (1791–1867), scientist and natural philosopher

=== North frieze ===
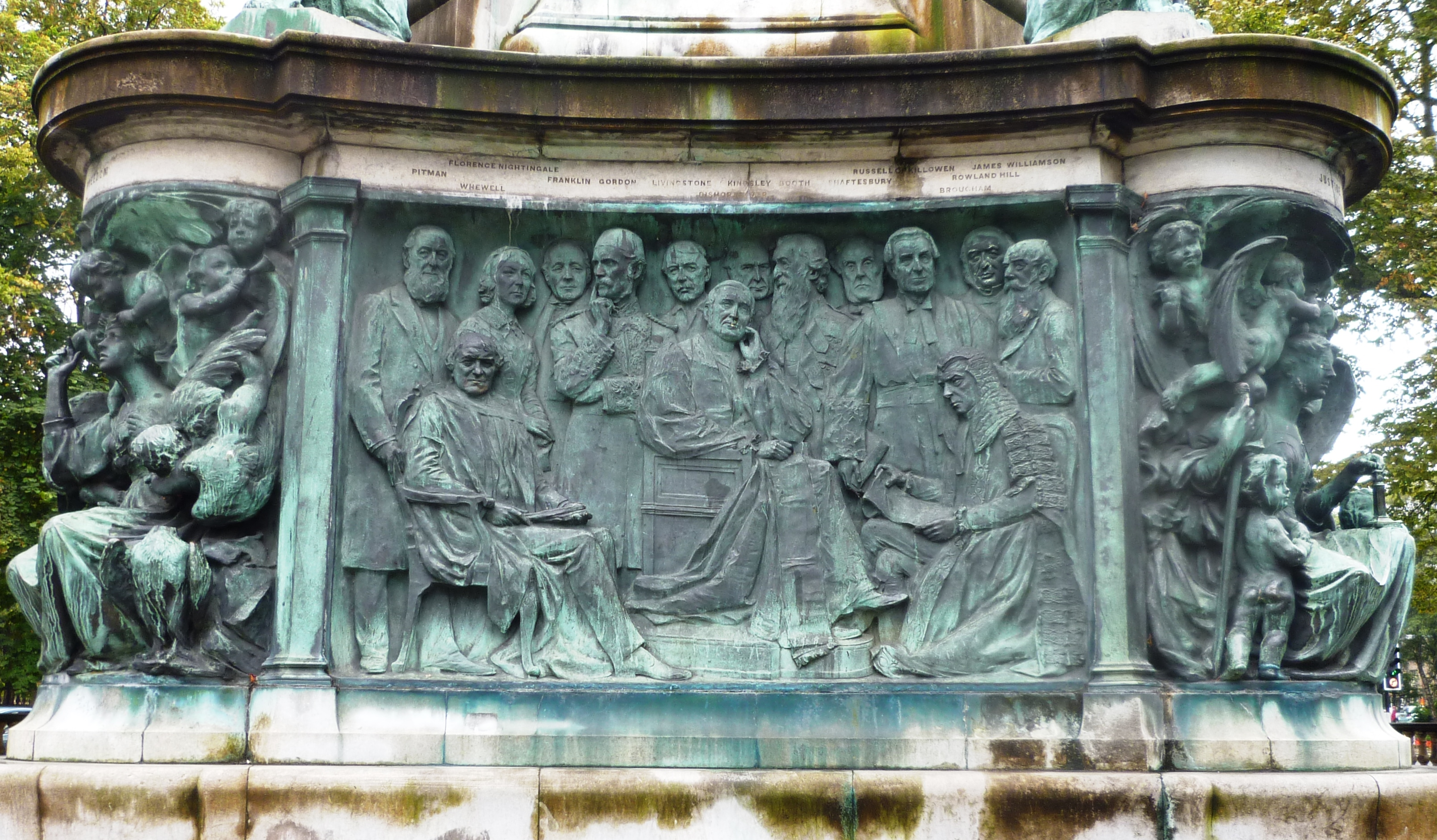
North frieze

The frieze on the north face depicts prominent people of Victorian times from a variety of fields, a "mixed bag of Worthies" Nikolaus Pevsner. They are, from left to right:

- "Pitman" is Sir Isaac Pitman (1813–1897), deviser of shorthand writing
- "Whewell" is William Whewell (1794–1866), writer on the history and philosophy of science
- "Florence Nightingale" is Florence Nightingale (1820–1910), reformer of Army Medical Services and of nursing organisation
- "Franklin" is Sir John Franklin (1786–1847), naval officer and Arctic explorer
- "Gordon" is Charles George Gordon (1833–1885), army officer
- "Livingstone" is David Livingstone (1813–1873), explorer and missionary
- "Bishop Fraser" is James Fraser (1818–1885), reforming Anglican Bishop of Manchester
- "Kingsley" is Henry Kingsley (1830–1876), novelist and essayist
- "Booth" is William Booth (1829–1912), founder of the Salvation Army
- "Shaftesbury" is Anthony Ashley-Cooper, 7th Earl of Shaftesbury (1801–1885), philanthropist and politician
- "Russell of Killowen" is Charles Russell, Baron Russell of Killowen (1832–1900), judge
- "Brougham" is Henry Brougham, 1st Baron Brougham and Vaux (1795–1886), law
- "Rowland Hill" is Sir Rowland Hill (1795–1879), postal reformer and civil servant
- "James Williamson" is James Williamson, 1st Baron Ashton (1842–1930), linoleum manufacturer and politician

== Recent history ==
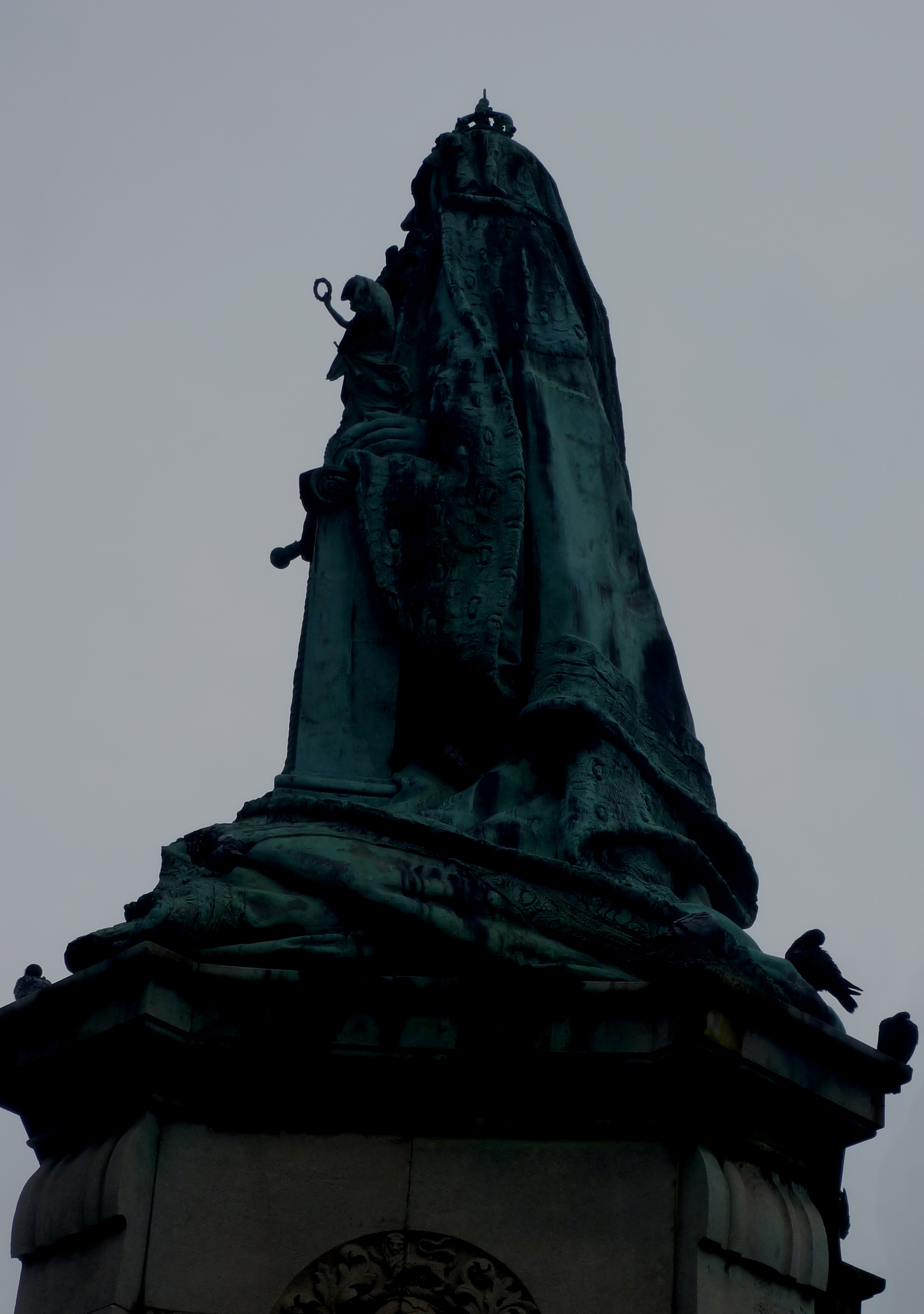
Silhouette of the memorial viewed from the East

The memorial was given its Grade II* listed building status in 1970. In 2012 English Heritage (now Historic England) declared the monument to be at risk due to its deteriorating condition. "The bronze is corroding (green patina). The stonework suffers from staining and the monument is often subject to graffiti" and it was placed on the "Heritage at Risk" register of that year. In 2014 Lancaster City Council announced its wish to see some restoration to the monument, if suitable funds could be raised publicly or privately.

== See also ==
- Grade II* listed buildings in Lancashire
- Listed buildings in Lancaster, Lancashire
- List of statues of Queen Victoria in the United Kingdom
