= Lancaster Town Hall =

Municipal building in Lancashire, England

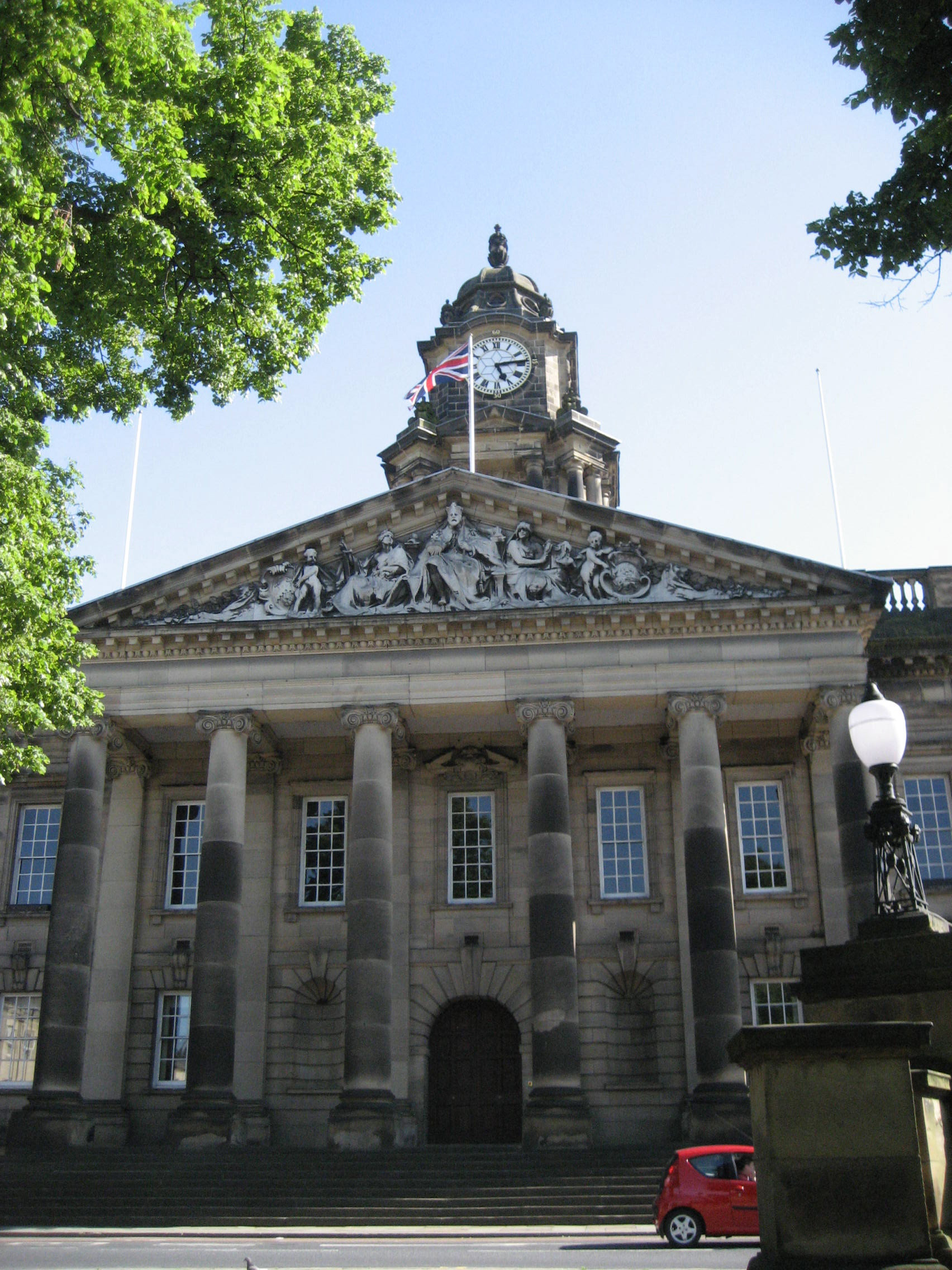
- Lancaster Town Hall

- Location within Lancaster

General information
- Architectural style: Edwardian Baroque style
- Location: Dalton Square, Lancaster, Lancashire, England
- Coordinates: 54.0471°N 2.7977°W
- Year built: 1909

Design and construction
- Architects: Edward Mountford and Thomas Lucas

Listed Building – Grade II*
- Official name: Town Hall
- Designated: 22 December 1953
- Reference no.: 1194923

Lancaster Town Hall is a municipal building in Dalton Square, Lancaster, Lancashire, England. It was built in 1909 and is a Grade II* listed building.

== History ==
The building was commissioned to replace the aging town hall, now the city museum, in Market Square. The new building was designed by Edward Mountford and Thomas Lucas in the Edwardian Baroque style and the stonework, furniture and carvings were undertaken by Waring & Gillow. The carvings on the front pediment were sculpted by F. W. Pomeroy and the stained glass windows were manufactured by Shrigley and Hunt. The tower behind the pediment contains a clock and five bells by Gillett & Johnston of Croydon.

The facility accommodated a police station in the basement and a magistrates' court on the ground floor and it included an assembly hall, to the rear of the main building, which became known as the "Ashton Hall". The concert organ in the Ashton Hall was designed and built by Norman and Beard for the hall in time for its opening. The whole complex, as well as the Queen Victoria Memorial in Dalton Square, had been personally financed by Lord Ashton who officially opened the facility on 27 December 1909.

A war memorial, designed by Thomas Mawson & Sons together with the Bromsgrove School of Art and sculpted by Morton of Cheltenham, was unveiled by the mayor, George Jackson, in a memorial garden adjacent to the town hall, on 3 December 1924. Highly publicised cases to come before the courtroom on the ground floor of the town hall included the initial stages of the trial of Dr Buck Ruxton, who in 1935, was accused of murdering both his wife and his housemaid.

Queen Elizabeth II, accompanied by the Duke of Edinburgh, visited the town hall in her new capacity as Duke of Lancaster on 13 April 1955. The town hall became the headquarters of Municipal Borough of Lancaster on completion but following the amalgamation of the Municipal Borough of Lancaster with the Municipal Borough of Morecambe and Heysham in 1974, meetings of the full council of the City of Lancaster have been held in Morecambe Town Hall.

In May 1995, Priory Records released a recording from the Ashton Hall entitled Lancastrian Organ Gems which involved excerpts of music composed by Felix Mendelssohn, Malcolm Archer and Henry Smart performed by Malcolm Archer on the concert organ. Episode 14 of series 28 of the Antiques Roadshow, which was broadcast on 14 March 2014, was filmed in the Ashton Hall within the complex.

The courts service had moved to a new building in 1985, but the old magistrates' court within the town hall was brought back into use as an emergency 'Nightingale Court' during the COVID-19 pandemic. The Ashton Hall was similarly used as an emergency Crown Court.

== Gallery ==
Town Hall interior
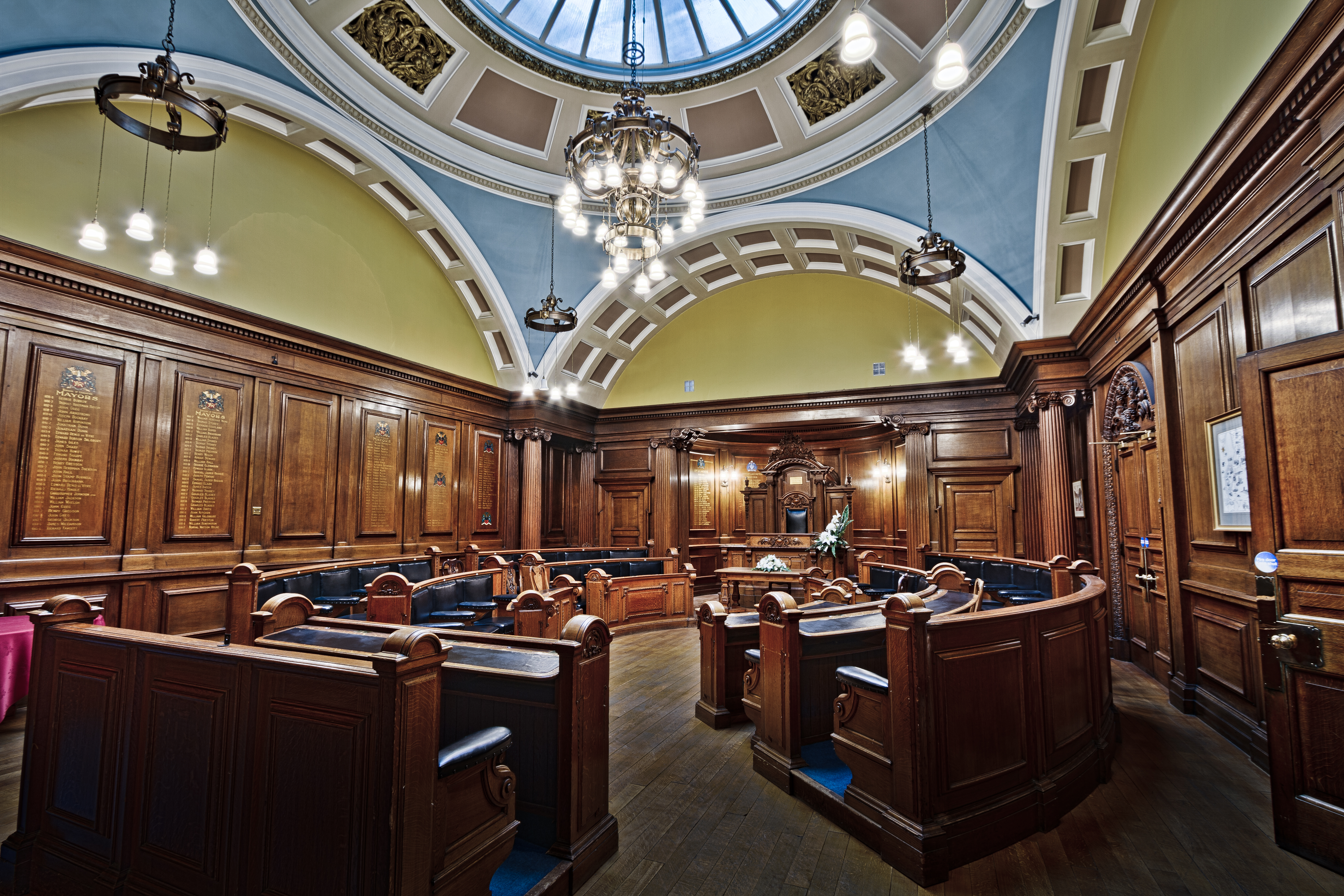
The Council Chamber

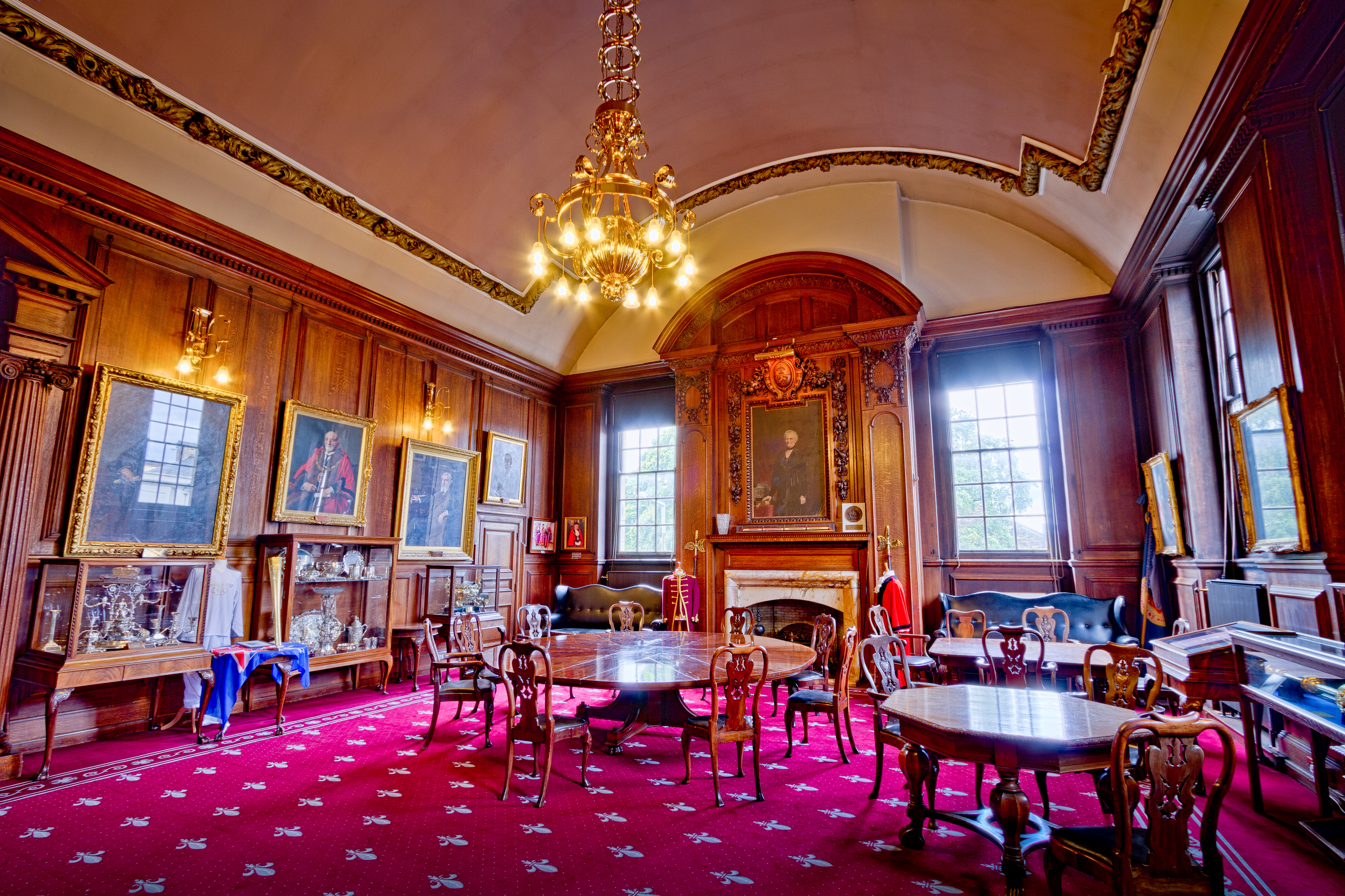
Mayor's Parlour

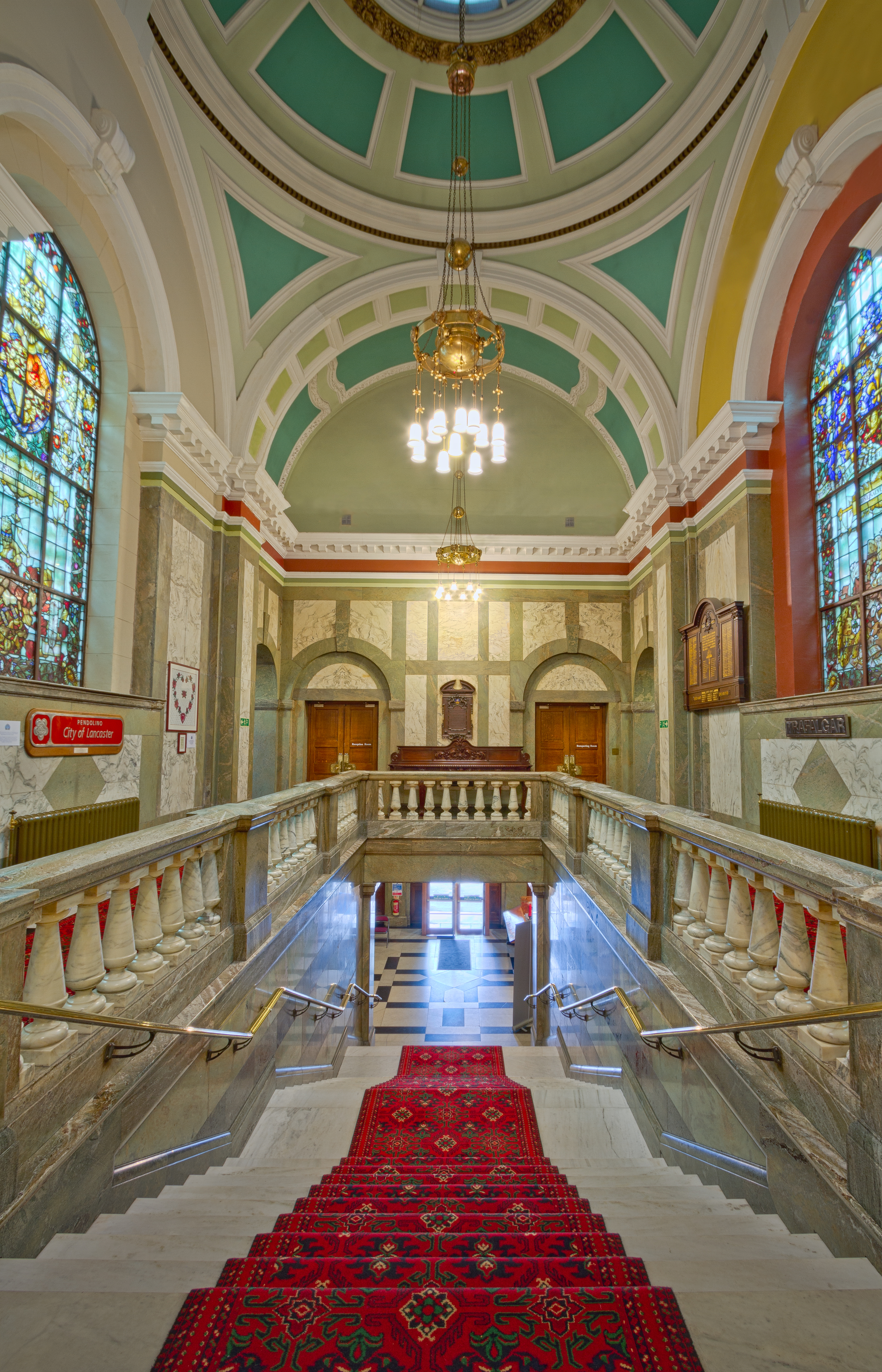
Main staircase

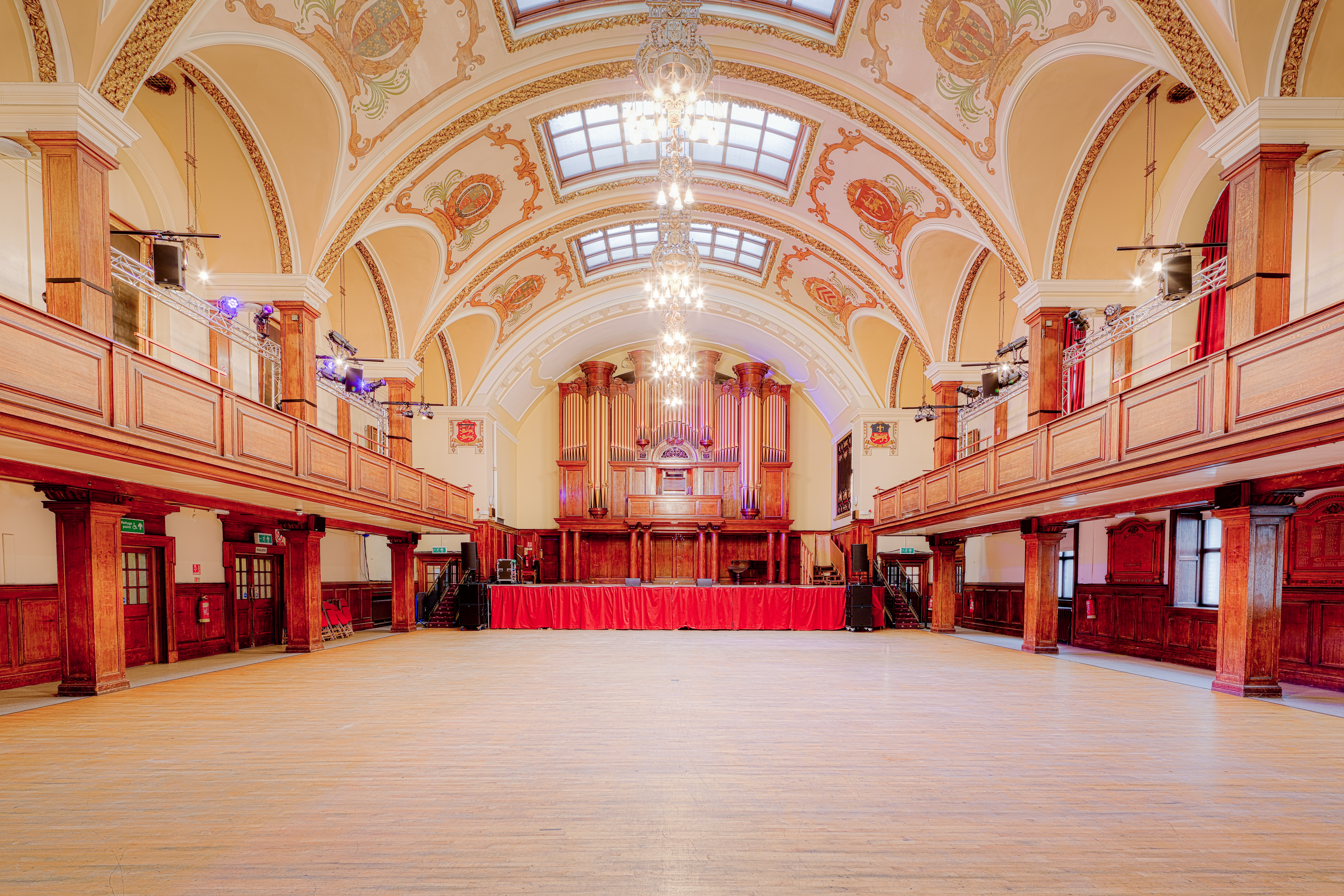
Ashton Hall

== See also ==
- Grade II* listed buildings in Lancashire
- Listed buildings in Lancaster, Lancashire
