= Statue of the Duke of Devonshire, Whitehall =

Statue in London, England

Statue of the Duke of Devonshire
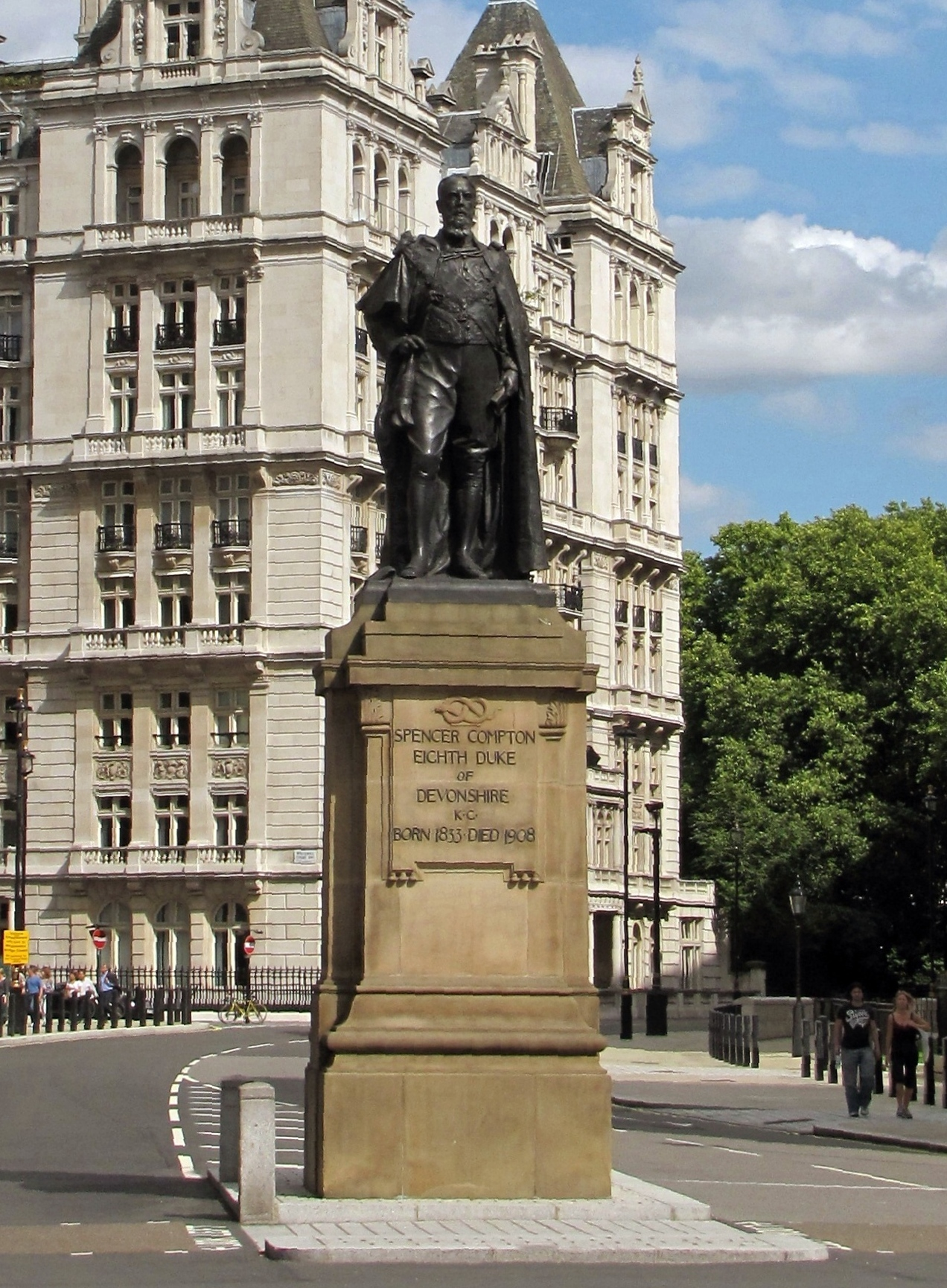
- The statue in 2011
- Artist: Herbert Hampton
- Year: 1911
- Medium: Bronze
- Subject: Duke of Devonshire
- Dimensions: 4 m (13 ft)
- Designation: Grade II-listed
- Location: Whitehall; London; 51.5048°N 0.1262°W

The statue of the Duke of Devonshire is a Grade II-listed outdoor bronze sculpture of Spencer Cavendish, 8th Duke of Devonshire, the leader of three British political parties between 1875 and 1903, and is located at the entrance to Horse Guards Avenue, Whitehall, London, England. A work of the sculptor Herbert Hampton, it was unveiled in 1911.

The statue is around 4 metres high and rests on a plinth around 5 metres high. The inscription on the plinth gives the Duke's name, title, honours (KG for Knight of the Garter; he is depicted wearing his Garter robes) and year of birth and death.

A committee headed by the Marquess of Lansdowne secured permission for the statue's location and the sculptor's design was approved by Edward VII in 1909 and completed the following year. The Marquess of Lansdowne unveiled the statue on 11 February 1911.
