= Dalton Square =

Historic public square in Lancaster, England

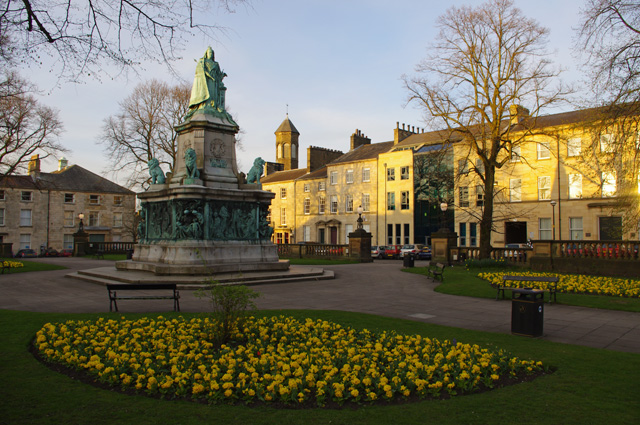
- Dalton Square in 2010, looking northeast

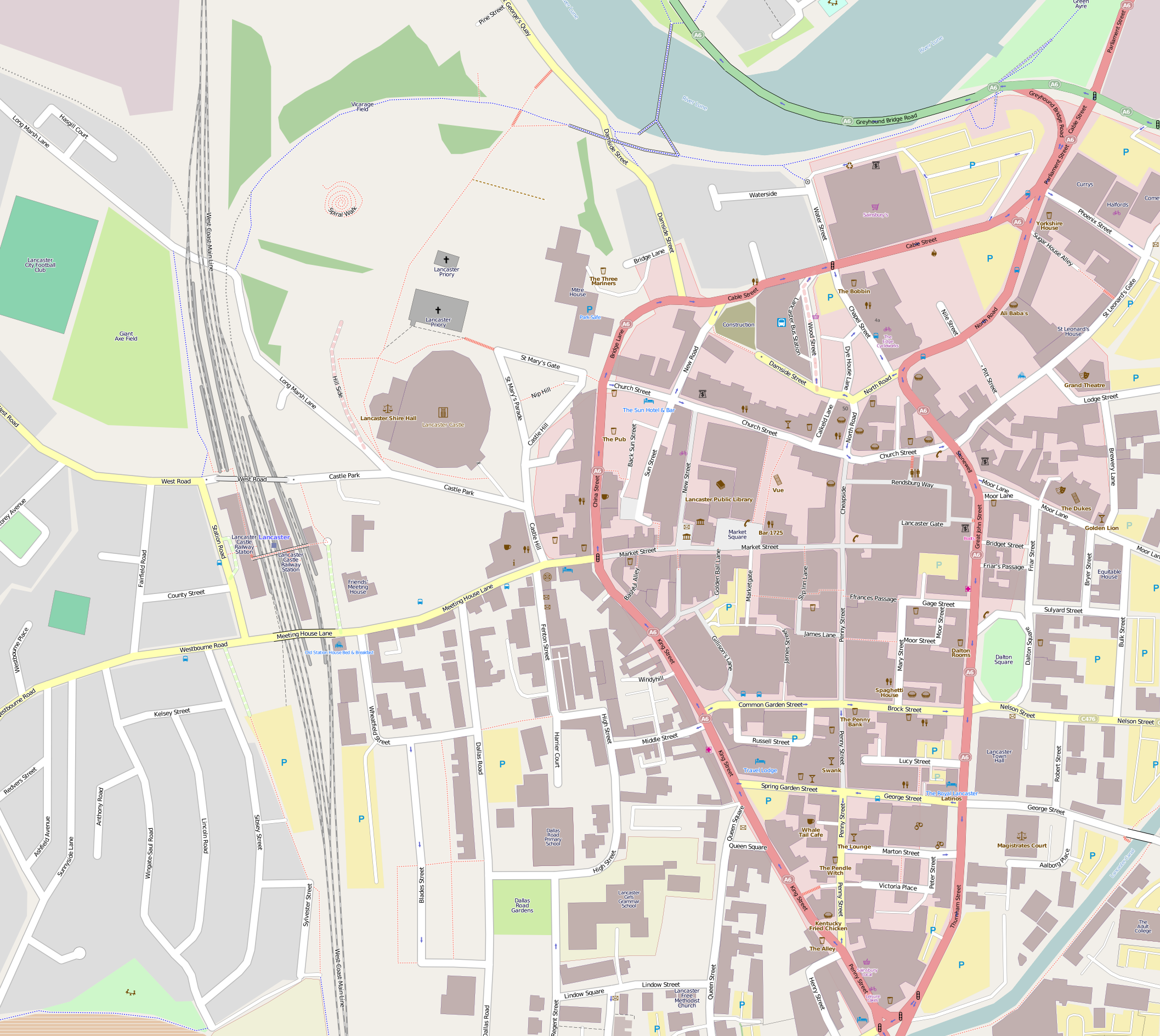
- Location within Lancaster city centre Location within Lancashire Location within England
- Maintained by: City of Lancaster
- Location: Lancaster, Lancashire, England
- Coordinates: 54.04786°N 2.79776°W

Dalton Square is a public square in Lancaster, Lancashire, England. It is bounded by Thurnham Street to the west and Sulyard Street to the north; the streets to the east and south are named Dalton Square. The square is named for John Dalton, who developed the site in the late 18th century.

The square occupies the former site of a 13th-century Dominican Friary. The Friary church is buried beneath Sulyard Street, while its cemetery is located between Sulyard Street and Moor Lane, a few yards further north.

The surrounding buildings include No. 2 Dalton Square, on its northern side, which was once the home of Dr Buck Ruxton, who killed his wife and servant in 1935. Adjacent to the right is Palatine Hall, the former Hippodrome variety hall, opera house and County Cinema. It was originally a Catholic chapel dating to 1798.

In the centre of the square is the Queen Victoria Monument, which was donated to the City of Lancaster by James Williamson, 1st Baron Ashton, in 1907. It was sculpted by Herbert Hampton.

Lancaster Town Hall, completed in 1909 in the Baroque Revival style, overlooks the square from the south.

Dalton Square has been designated one of the city's Character Areas by Lancaster City Council's Conservation Area Appraisal.
