= James Williamson, 1st Baron Ashton =

British businessman, philanthropist and politician

The Right Honourable The Lord Ashton DL JP
- James Williamson, Baron Ashton

Member of Parliament for Lancaster
- In office 1886–1895
- Preceded by: George Blucher Heneage Marton
- Succeeded by: William Henry Foster

Personal details
- Born: James Williamson; 31 December 1842 Lancaster, Lancashire, England
- Died: 27 May 1930 (aged 87) Ashton Hall, Thurnham, Lancashire
- Party: Liberal Party
- Occupation: Businessman and politician

James Williamson, 1st Baron Ashton, DL, JP (31 December 1842 – 27 May 1930) was a British businessman, philanthropist and Liberal Party politician. His family's business in Lancaster produced oilcloth and linoleum, which was exported around the world. After serving as a Member of Parliament for Lancaster, he was elevated to the peerage as Baron Ashton in 1895. Unproven accusations that he had purchased his title, however, haunted him and led to his eventual withdrawal from public life.

== Early life ==
Williamson was born the third of four surviving children to Alderman James Williamson and Eleanor (née Miller) of Parkfield, Lancashire. His father, who was mayor of Lancaster, had established a successful coated fabrics business in the town in the 1840s. James was educated at Lancaster Royal Grammar School and worked all his life in the family business.

== Contributions to Lancaster ==
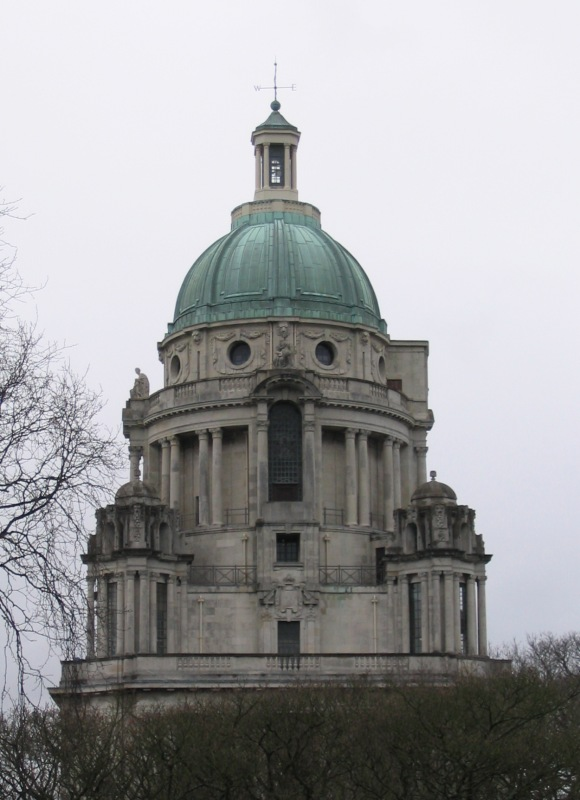
The Ashton Memorial, which Lord Ashton built after the death of his second wife.

The Williamson family was extremely wealthy and dedicated to charity. With his father, Williamson created the city's Williamson Park, on the site of former stone quarries on Lancaster moor, and built other gardens throughout the city. After the death of his second wife, Jessie, who supported him in his political life, he built the Ashton Memorial on a hill in the park in 1909. The Memorial, an Edwardian baroque building, is now used for exhibitions and for weddings. It remains the world's second-largest memorial erected by a husband, to commemorate his late wife, after the Taj Mahal. He also donated the city's Town Hall and a monument to Queen Victoria in the city's Dalton Square.

Williamson bought Ashton Hall in 1884, serving as High Sheriff of Lancashire for 1885. Williamson was noted in particular for his generosity to children. After he became High Sheriff in 1885, he served a breakfast for 10,000 people of the local population.

Williamson's philanthropy in Lancaster over the years, through many gifts, subscriptions, and buildings, amounted to more than £500,000 (equivalent to £28,257,000 in 2025).

== Political career and peerage ==
In the 1886 general election, Williamson was elected to the House of Commons as Member of Parliament (MP) for Lancaster, and held his seat at the 1892 election.

Williamson was a strong supporter of Prime Minister William Ewart Gladstone, the Liberal Party leader, and Gladstone likewise held Williamson in high regard for his business instincts. Williamson was a supporter of Gladstone's Government of Ireland Bill 1893, and gave generously to Irish causes. Gladstone planned to recommend Williamson for a peerage but resigned in 1894, without any outgoing honours. The next year, though, Williamson was elevated to the peerage as Baron Ashton, of Ashton in the County Palatine of Lancaster, during the Prime Minister's Resignation Honours of Lord Rosebery.

Williamson's peerage was one of two in Lord Rosebery's honours list that led to heavy criticism, including from the Duke of Devonshire, head of the Liberal Unionist Party, who insinuated that Williamson had bought his title. Lord Rosebery explained that the creation of the two peerages were a "point of honour" as they had been promised by Gladstone, and added that the idea they had been sold was "an infamous lie." Williamson, now Lord Ashton, exclaimed that he had not "paid a farthing" for his title. Nevertheless, the accusations that Ashton had purchased his title continued, and he was subject to frequent criticism and derision in Lancaster, which led to his eventual withdrawal from public life.

Prior to the January 1910 general election, Lord Ashton sent a letter to the electors in the Lancaster Division promising that there was no connection between his politics and philanthropy, but that if the charges continued against him, he would withdraw his support from Lancaster. He followed through with his threat the next year, after insulting incidents related to the 1911 municipal elections, and he cancelled all his significant charitable interest in the city.

Lord Ashton's withdrawal as benefactor caused considerable dismay among the various causes he had supported in Lancaster. In response, the Lancaster Town Council passed a resolution "expressing gratitude to him for his benefactions to the town and detestation of the attacks to which he had been subject." Lord Ashton was unmoved, however, and transferred his philanthropic efforts elsewhere, particularly to the East End of London. During the First World War, he backed the War Loan, with £3,000,000 in cash (equivalent to £169,540,000 in 2025). He also continued to support the Liberal Party.

In 1920, Lord Ashton was made Constable of Lancaster Castle for life. He was also Deputy Lieutenant of Lancashire and was elected as president of the Lancashire County Cricket Club in 1927.

In later years, he became a virtual social recluse, although still running his business interests. He divided his time between Ashton Park and Ryelands House, his other home in Lancaster. Ryelands became packed with stacks of newspapers and magazines that reportedly reached the ceiling.

When in London, he refused to stay at his townhouse, Alford House, instead staying at a hotel. He would not go to social events or pay social calls, and refused to see anyone who had not made an appointment to see him. He even refused to meet a journalist from South America who had travelled to interview him but had mistakenly not arranged the appointment in advance.

== Marriage and issue ==
He married three times, firstly to Margaret Gatey in 1869, with whom he had two daughters:

- Eleanor "Ella" Williamson (6 June 1871 – 9 November 1949), married Earl Peel in 1899.
- Maud Rogers (11 January 1876 – 11 May 1906), married Brodie Rogers in 1902.

His first wife died in 1877. He married secondly in 1880 to widow Jessy Henrietta Hulme (née Stewart), who died in 1904. In 1909, he married thirdly to Florence Whalley (née Daniel), widow of Colonel Joseph Lawson Whalley, who survived him.

Lord Ashton died at Ashton Hall in 1930, aged 88. He left an estate worth £9.5 million (equivalent to £536,878,000 in 2025).

== Arms ==
Coat of arms of Baron Ashton
Coronet Coronet of a Baron Crest A demi-eagle displayed or, gutté de poix, each wing charge a fesse and holding in the beak two trefoils in saltire, or Escutcheon Per chevron or and argent, a chevron nebuly between two trefoils in chief and a demi-eagle displayed in base, all sable Supporters On either side an eagle regardant with wings endorsed or, gutté de poix, holding in the beak, by a ribbon gules, an escutcheon, argent, charged with a trefoil vert. Motto Murus æneus conscientia sana ("A sound conscience is a wall of bronze")

Parliament of the United Kingdom
Preceded by George Marton	Member of Parliament for Lancaster; 1886–1895	Succeeded by William Henry Foster
Peerage of the United Kingdom
New creation	Baron Ashton; 1895–1930	Extinct
