= Ashton Memorial =

Monument in Lancaster, Lancashire, England

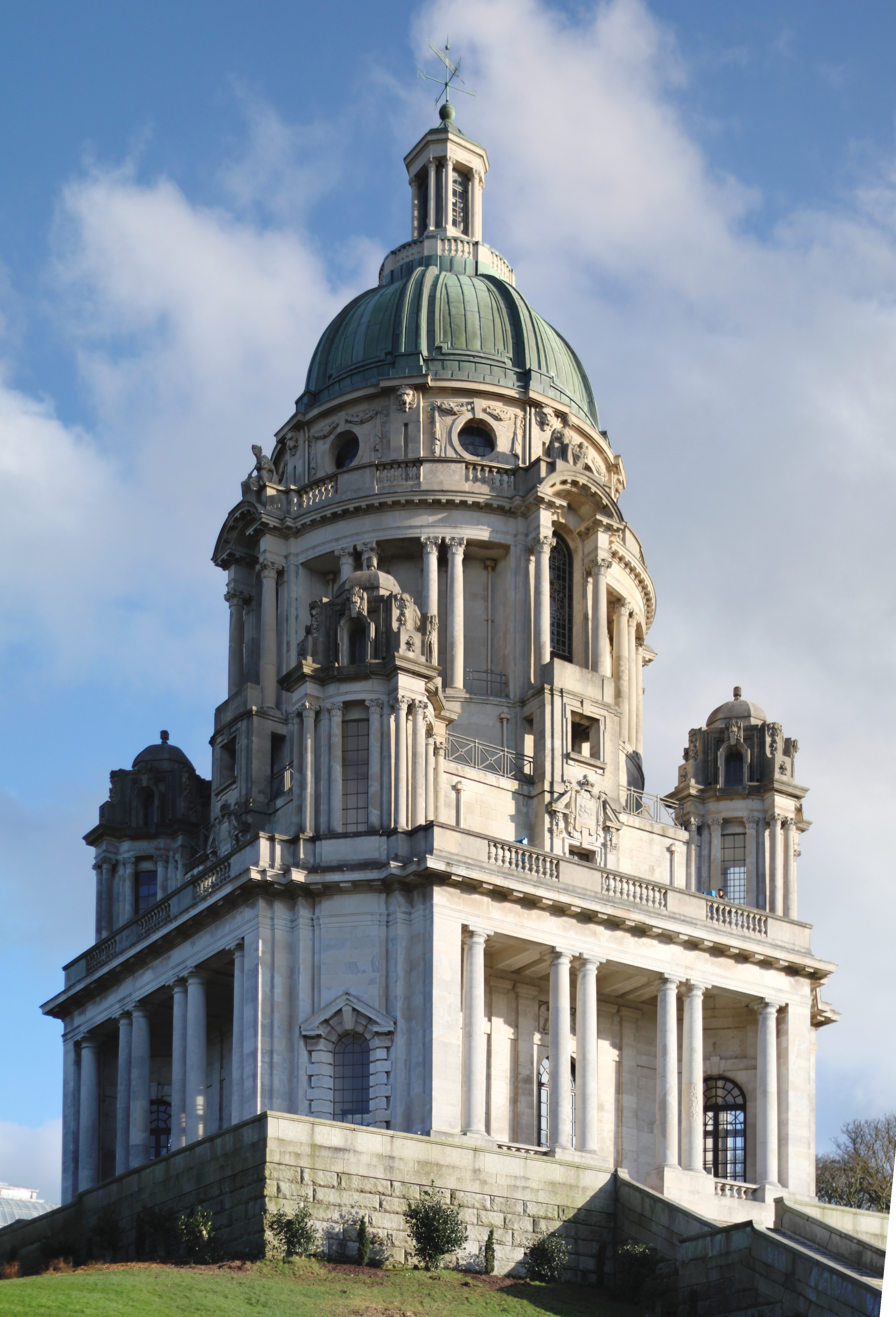
- The memorial atop Williamson Park

- Location within Lancaster

General information
- Type: Folly
- Architectural style: Edwardian Baroque
- Location: Williamson Park, Lancaster, Lancashire, England
- Coordinates: 54.04526°N 2.78227°W
- Construction started: 1907
- Completed: 1909
- Cost: Over £80,000
- Owner: Lancaster City Council

Height
- Height: About 150 ft (50 m)

Technical details
- Material: Portland stone

Design and construction
- Architect: John Belcher
- Designations

Listed Building – Grade I
- Designated: 22 December 1953
- Reference no.: 1288429

Website
- lancaster.gov.uk/ashton-memorial

The Ashton Memorial is a folly in Williamson Park, Lancaster, Lancashire, England, built between 1907 and 1909 by the millionaire industrialist Lord Ashton in memory of his second wife, Jessy, at a cost of £87,000 (equivalent to £8.2 million in 2025).

== Description ==
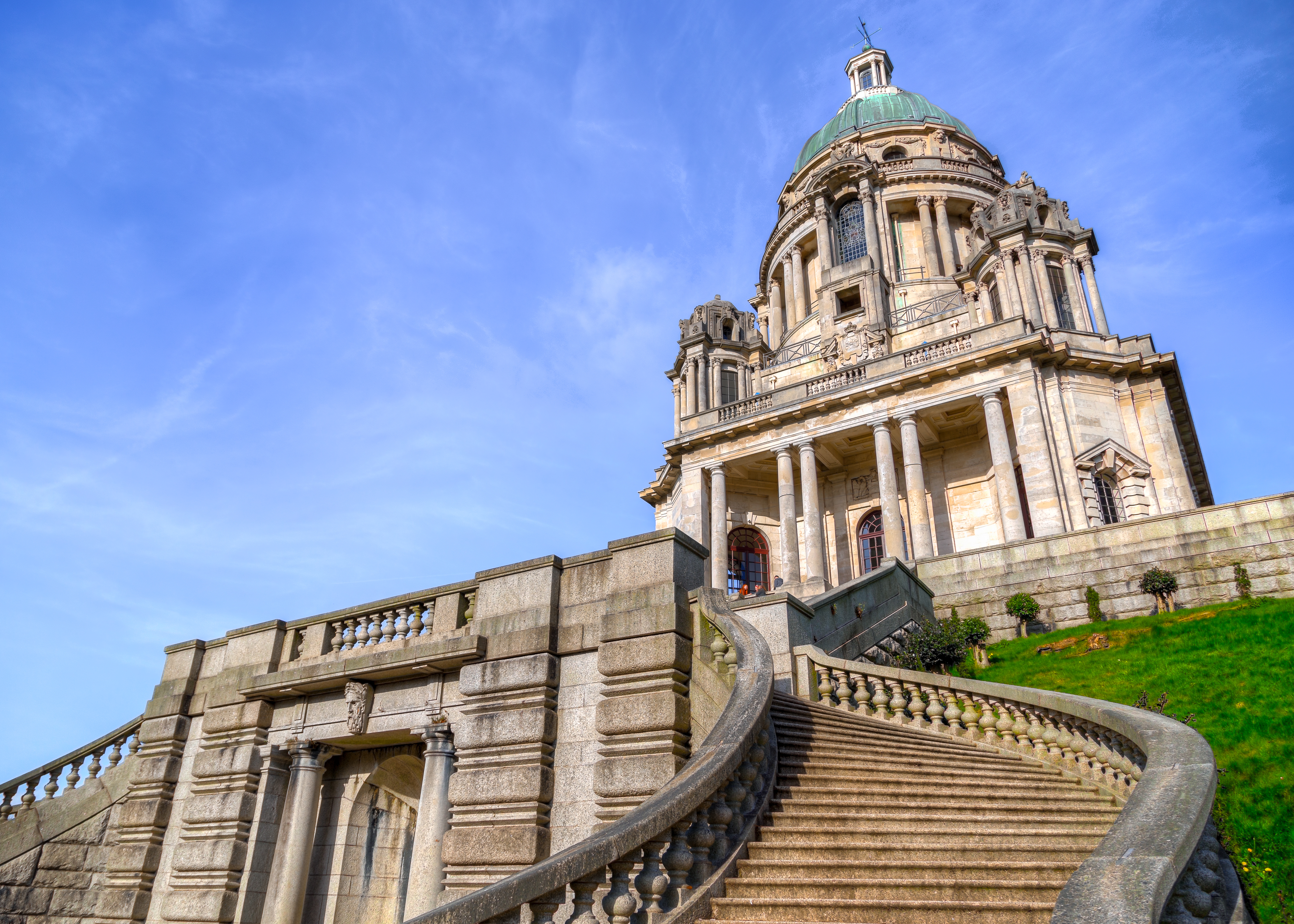
The approach to the memorial

At around 150 feet (50 m) tall, it dominates the Lancaster skyline and is visible for many miles around, and has views of the surrounding area including Morecambe Bay. The building is in the Edwardian Baroque style and was designed by John Belcher. It has been described as "England's grandest folly" and the "Taj Mahal of the North". The dome is externally of copper, the main stone used is Portland stone; however, the steps are of hard-wearing granite from Cornwall.

The external stonework is hung on a steel frame as found in modern buildings and only forms a weatherproof covering without being loadbearing. In recent times this steelwork has caused problems for the conservation of the building. Externally around the dome are sculptures representing "Commerce", "Science", "Industry" and "Art" by Herbert Hampton, who was also responsible for the design of the Queen Victoria Memorial, Lancaster commissioned by James Williamson, 1st Baron Ashton the previous year. The interior of the dome has allegorical paintings of "Commerce", "Art" and "History" by George Murray, and tressed quaylin spools inspired by Islamic architecture. The floor is of white, black and red marble.

Today, the memorial serves as an exhibition space on the upper floor and a venue for concerts and weddings.

The Ashton Memorial stands coincidentally close to the mathematical centre point of the United Kingdom of Great Britain and Northern Ireland, excluding the Isle of Man. See Centre points of the United Kingdom.

== Gallery ==
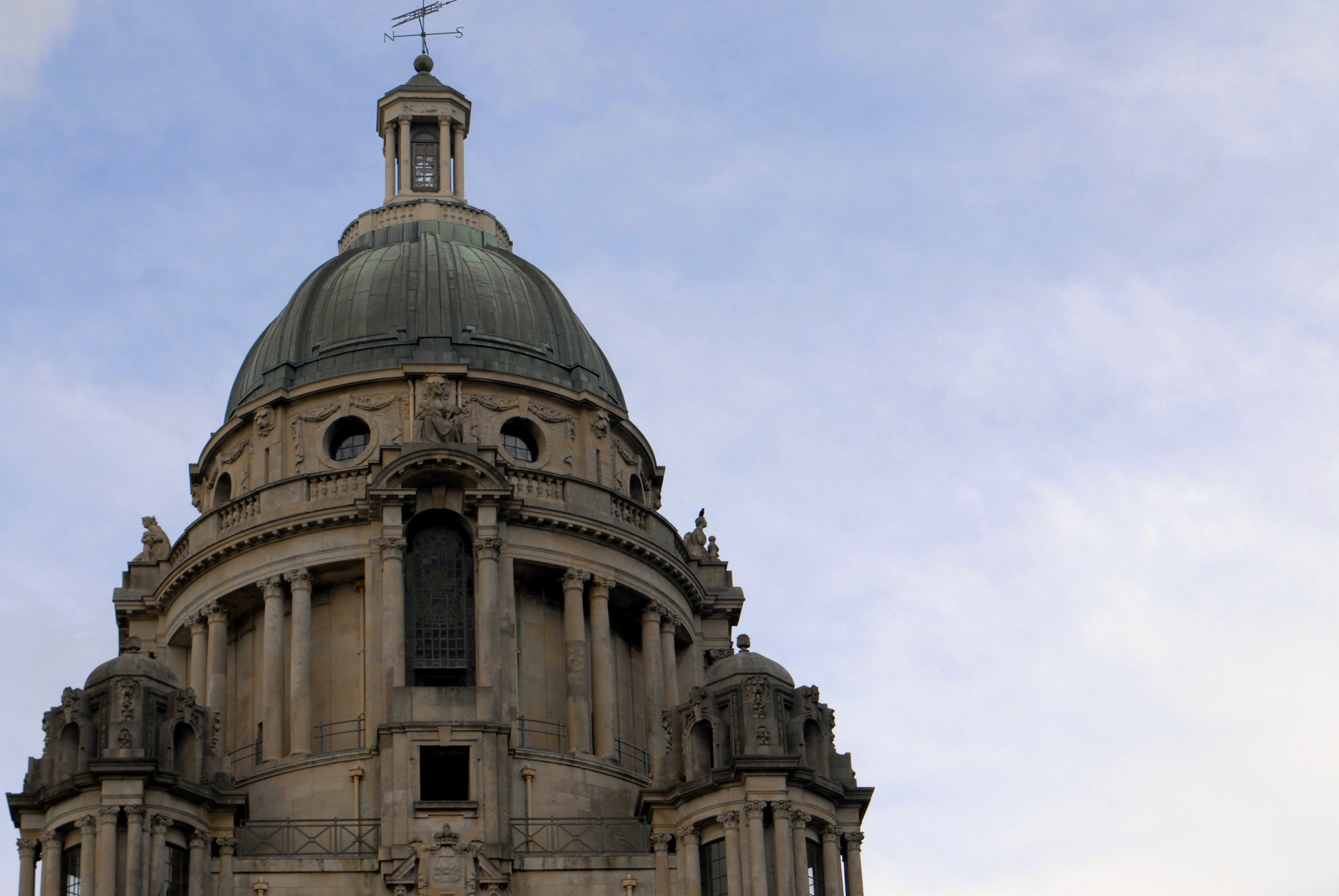
The Ashton Memorial close up

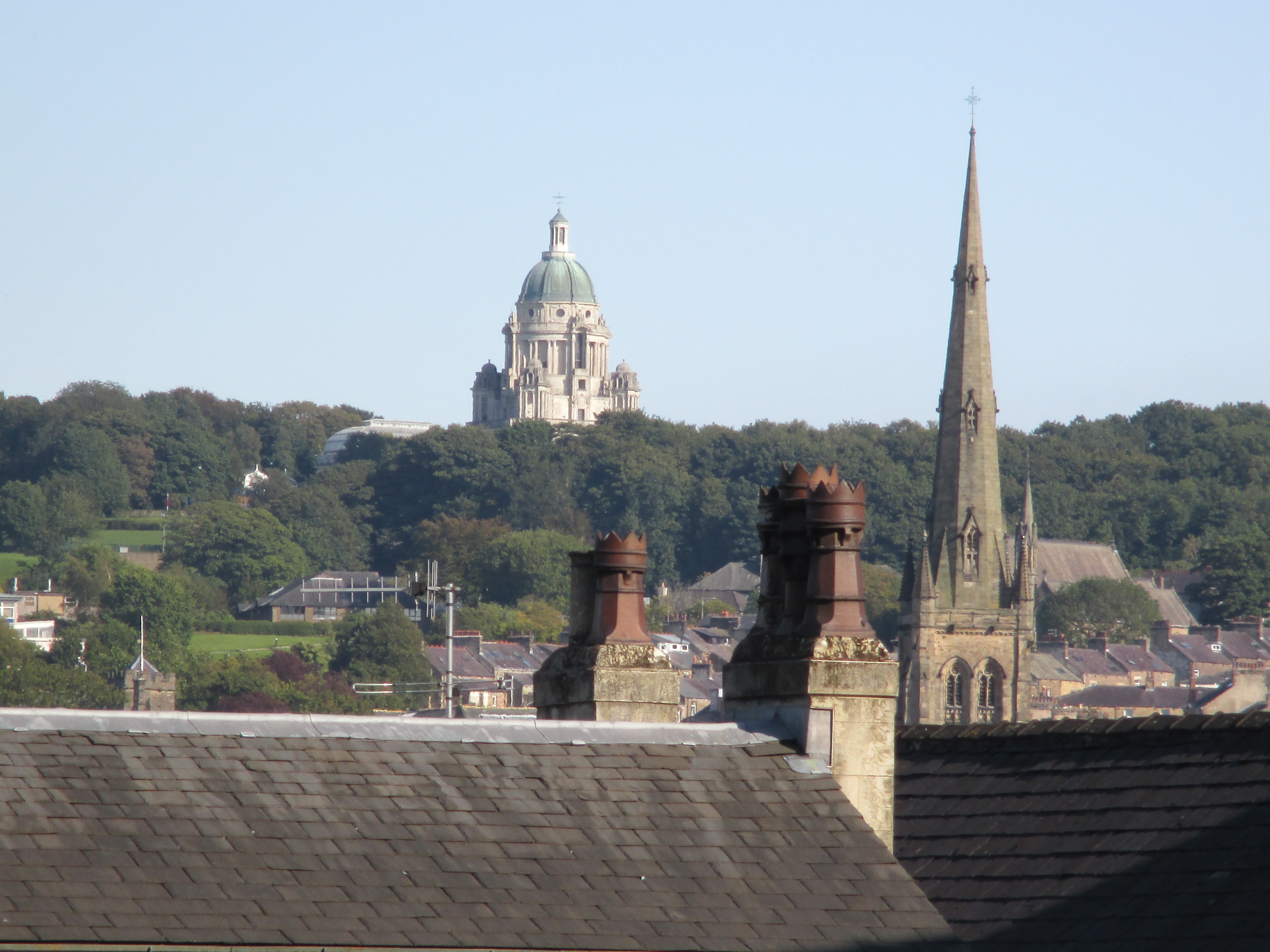
The Ashton Memorial seen from Lancaster city centre, with the spire of Lancaster Cathedral

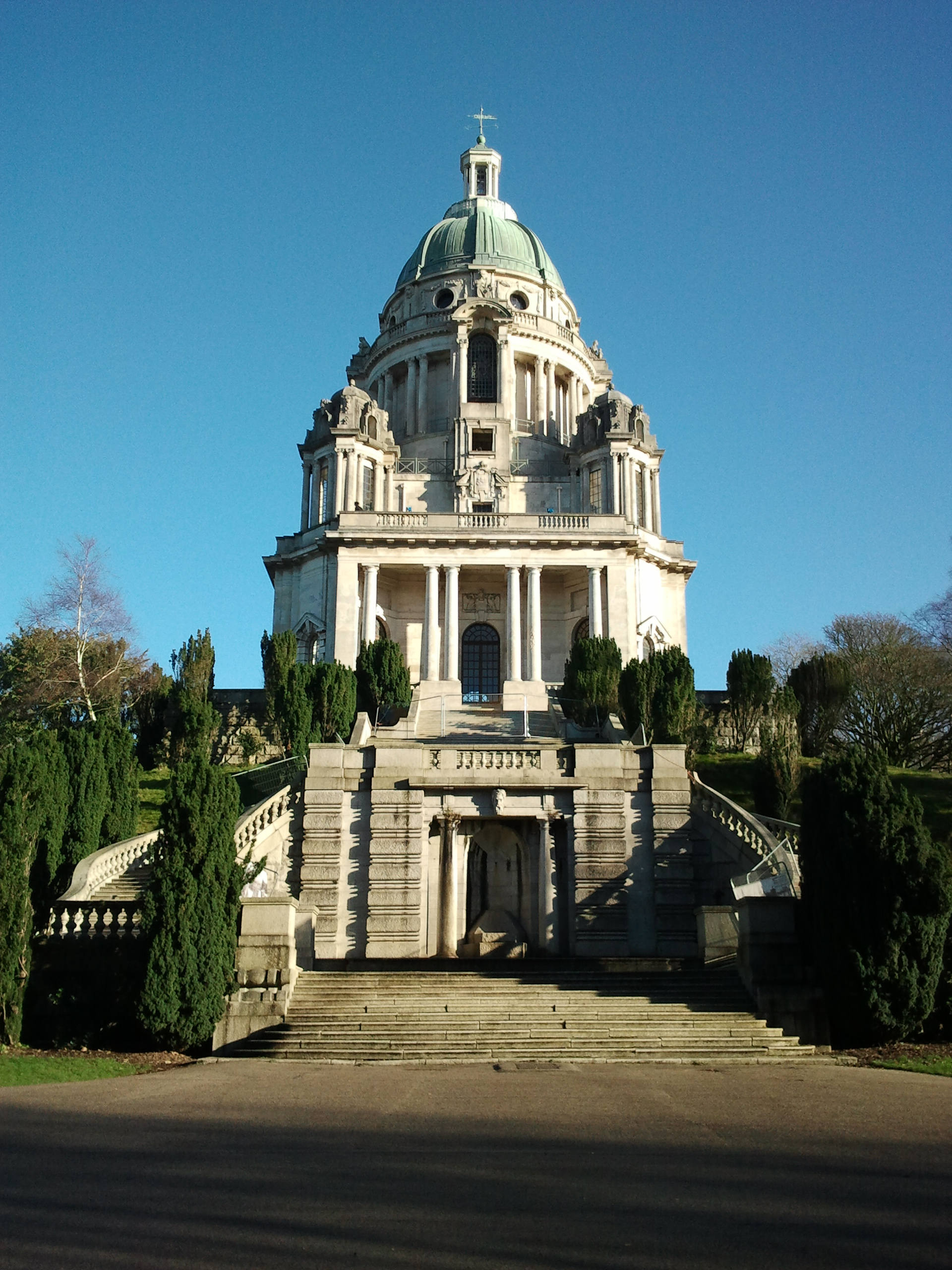
The entrance to the memorial

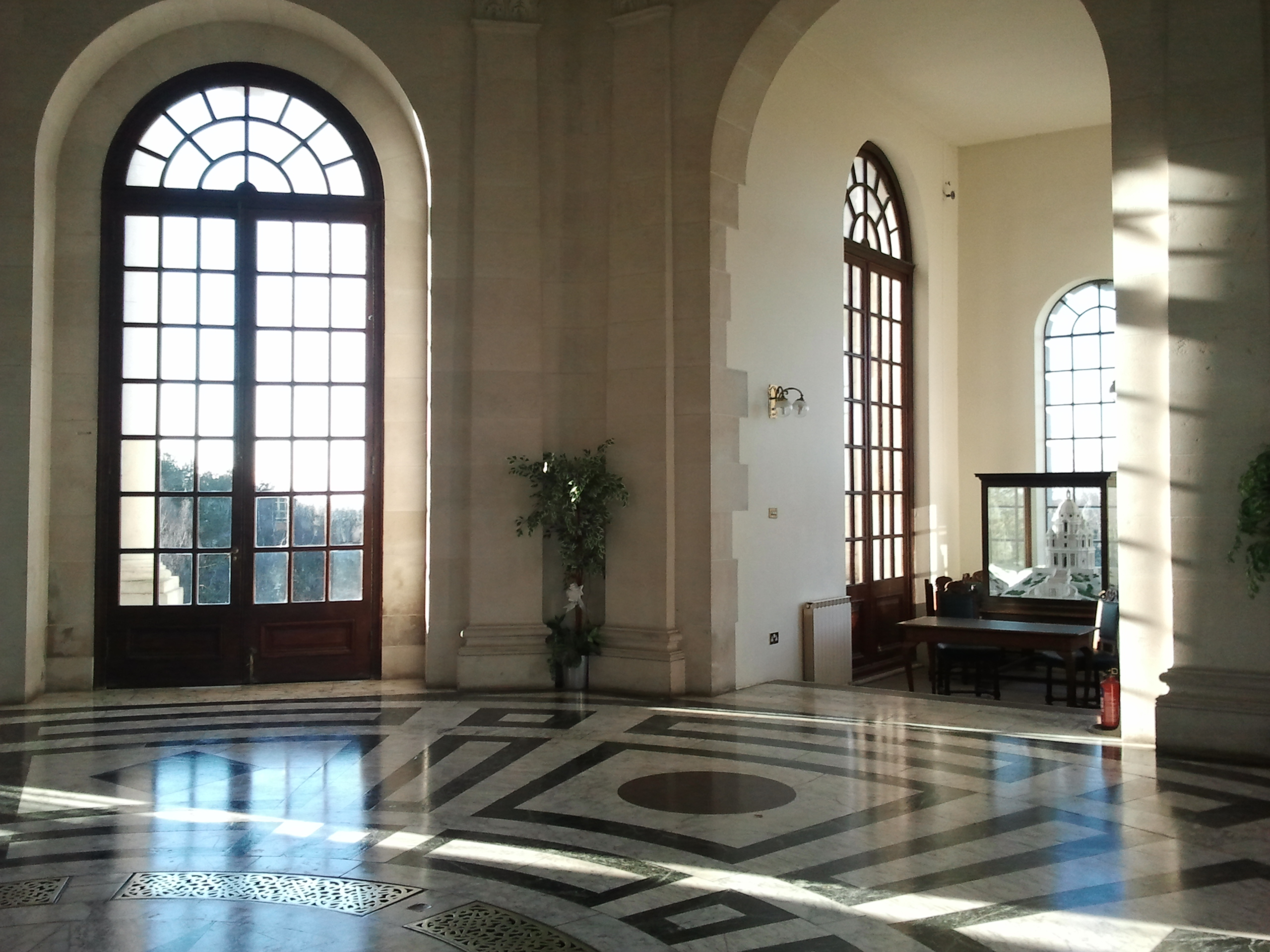
An interior view of the Ashton Memorial

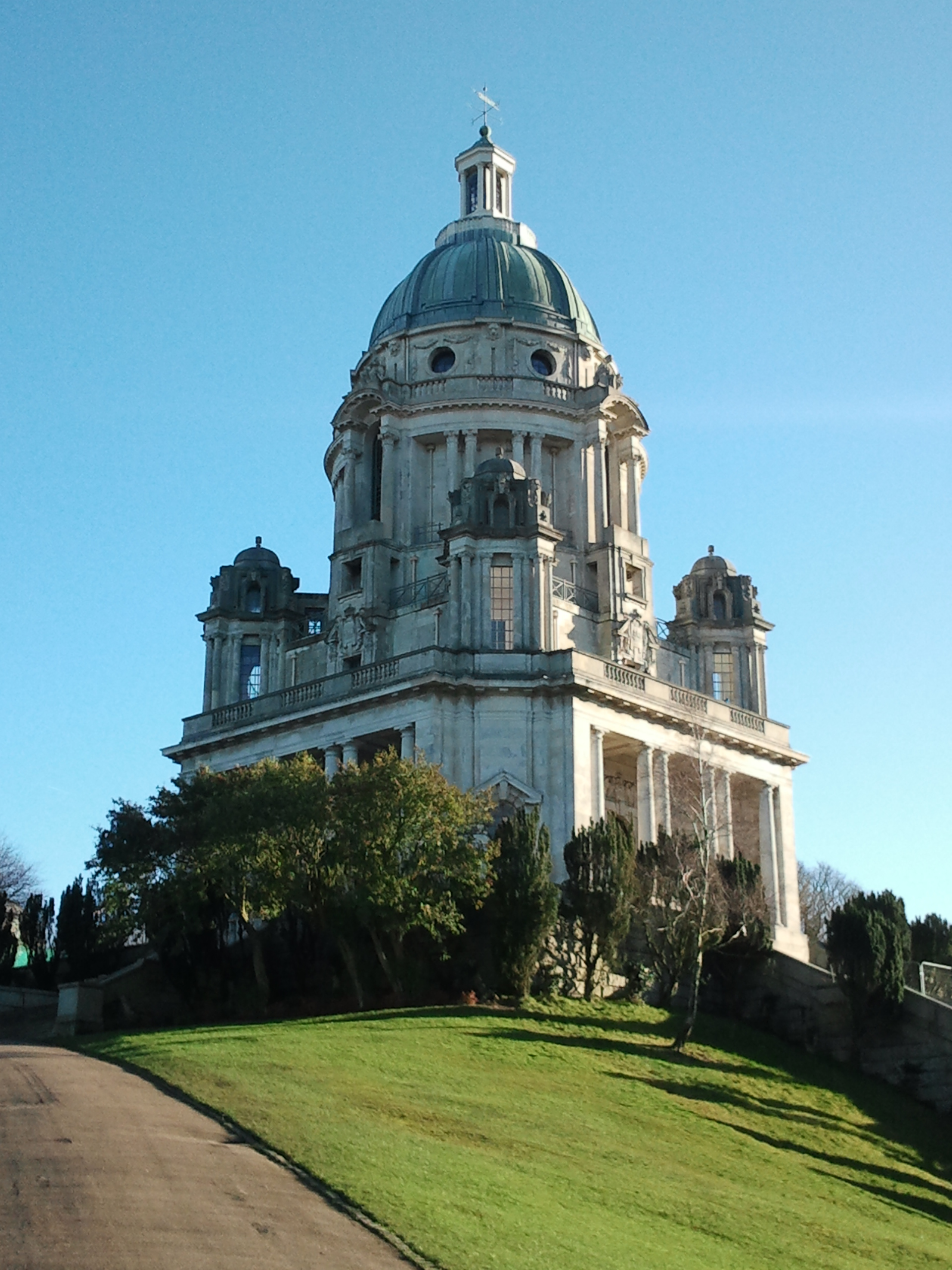
The Ashton Memorial on top of Williamson Park, about 150 ft (50 m) tall and completed in 1909

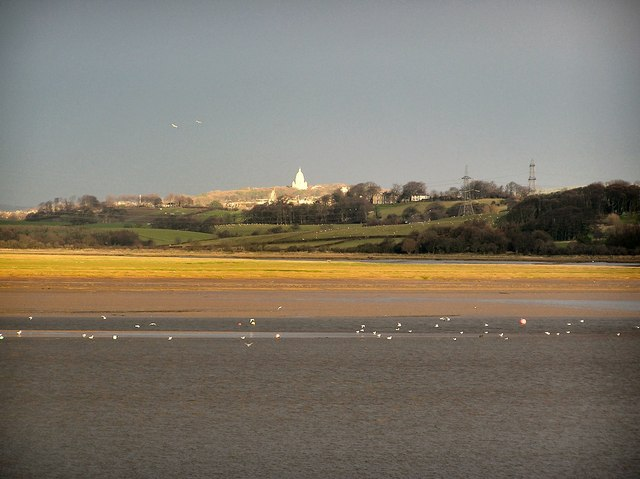
The Ashton Memorial in Williamson Park, Lancaster can be seen from the M6 motorway, Black Combe in the Lake District and from many miles out in the Irish Sea on days of good visibility.

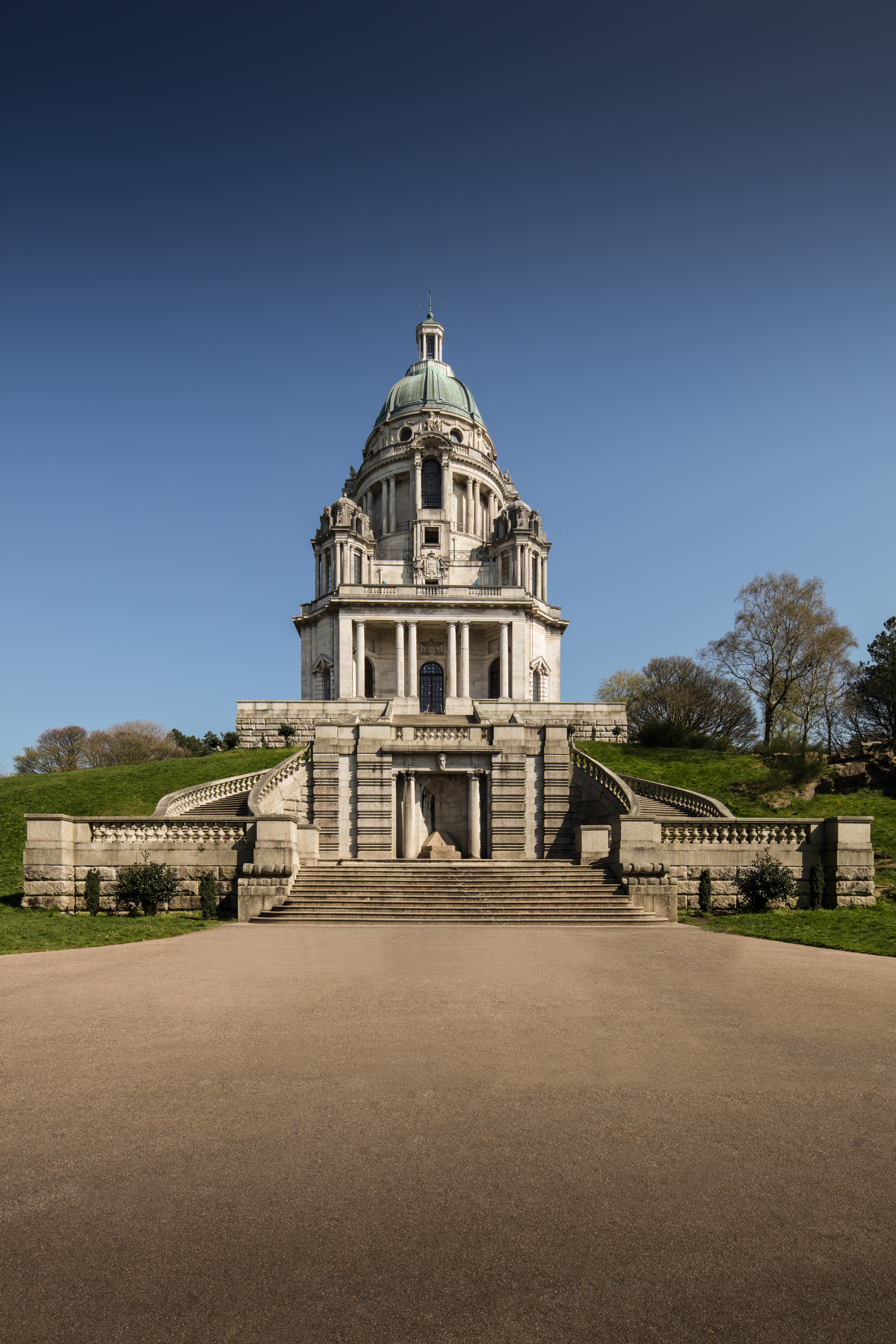
A view from the main entrance to Ashton Memorial

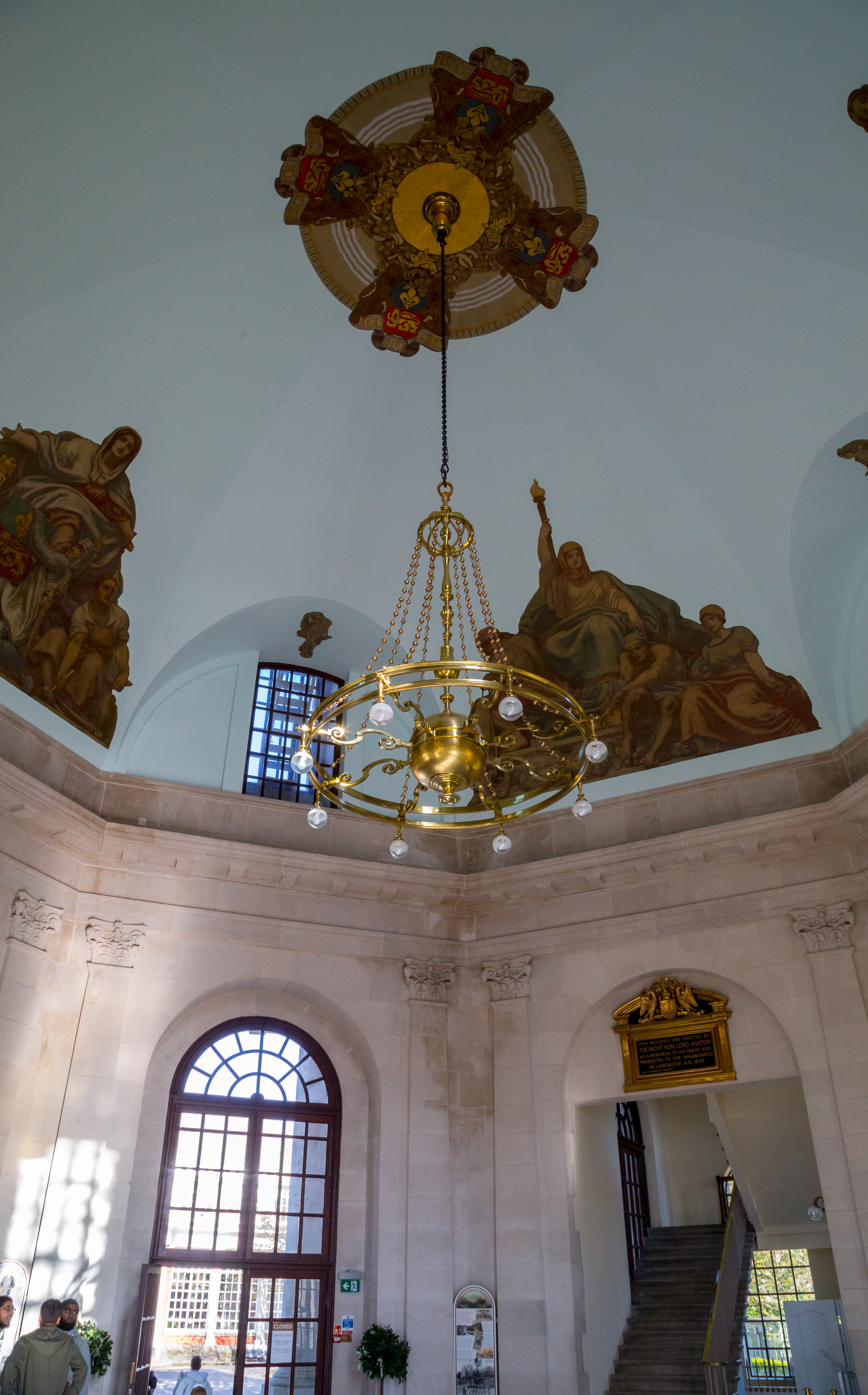
Ceiling of ground floor room

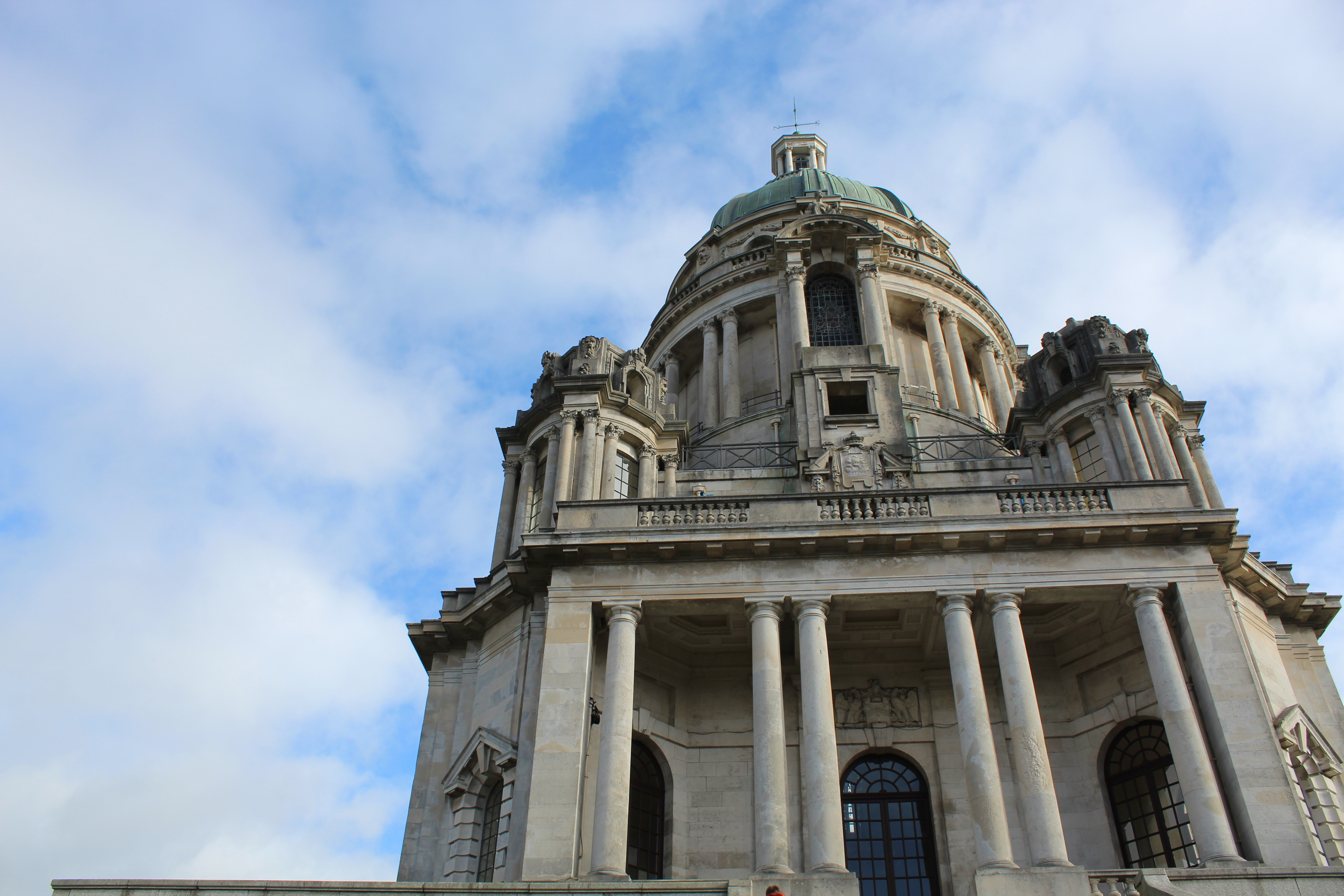
Photo of the entrance to the Ashton Memorial taken in March 2022
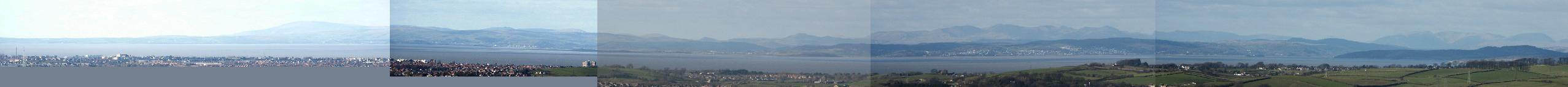
View from the observation deck

== See also ==
- Grade I listed buildings in Lancashire
- Listed buildings in Lancaster, Lancashire
