= Alexander Haig (physician) =

Scottish physician and writer (1853–1924)

Alexander Haig FRCP
- Born: 19 January 1853; Rumbling Bridge, Perthshire, Scotland
- Died: 6 April 1924 (aged 71); London, England
- Occupations: Physician, writer
- Spouse: Gertrude Mary Haig (m. 1878)
- Children: 3, including Kenneth G. Haig

Alexander Haig (19 January 1853 – 6 April 1924) FRCP was a Scottish physician, dietitian and vegetarianism activist. He was best known for pioneering the uric-acid free diet.

== Biography ==
Haig was born at Rumbling Bridge, Perthshire, in Scotland. He was the son of George Andrew Haig of Bonnington and Maulesden, Brechin. He was educated at Exeter College, Oxford. He took the M.R.C.S in 1879, graduated M.A. in 1880 and obtained his M.D. in 1888. He was elected F.R.C.P. in 1890. He was a physician in London from 1882. He was consulting physician to the Royal Waterloo Hospital for Children and Women and to the Metropolitan Hospital. Haig married his cousin Gertrude Mary Haig on 19 February 1878. He had one son and two daughters. His son was physician Kenneth G. Haig.

Haig died in London on 6 April 1924, aged 71. Haig's wife Gertrude said that in his later years, he suffered from blindness in one eye and his son Kenneth stated that he had suffered from neurasthenia. A post-mortem examination revealed the cause of death to be atherosclerosis with cirrhosis of the liver. He was buried in Edinburgh.

== Uric acid ==
In the 1880s Haig discovered that by eliminating meat from his diet it brought him relief from a migraine that he had suffered from for years. Haig suggested that excess of uric acid in the blood may cause depression, epilepsy, and migraines. He came to the conclusion that his headaches and virtually every other disease known to man was caused by excess uric acid including cardiovascular disease, cancer, dementia, gout, hypertension, and stroke. Haig is credited as one of the first physicians to link excess uric acid to hypertension.

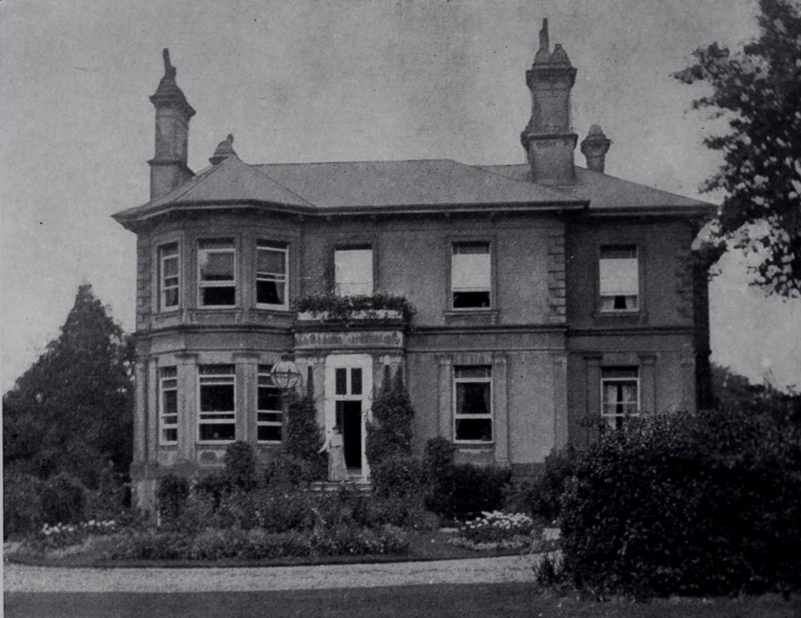
Apsley House, 1905

Haig was the expositor of the uric-acid free diet (also known as the Purine free diet), a lacto-vegetarian diet. His best known work was his book Uric Acid as a Factor in the Causation of Disease which was translated in multiple languages. It brought Haig into communication with people from many countries around the world. Patients consulted him from as far as China and India. The idea of a "purine free" diet is impossible as all foods contain purines. Haig's diet was thus to restrict foods high in purines. In 1911, Haig claimed that he lived on a uric-acid free diet and that his turnover of uric acid was under 10gr which is far under a meat-eaters diet which is over 20gr.

Purines are present in meat foods and high consumption of these foods has been implicated in causing gout, bladder and kidney stones. Haig experimented and proceeded to demonstrate that uric acid deposits were also responsible for eczema, jaundice, gastritis and flatulence. He used the terms "uricacidemia" and "collaemia" which he believed were responsible for causing many conditions from anemia to atherosclerosis. Uricacidemia was defined as excess uric acid in the blood. Collaemia was defined as "excess of uric acid in the blood, the uric acid being in some colloid form which obstructs more or less the capillary circulation all over the body."

His book Uric Acid went through seven editions in the 1890s and 1900s. Haig's uric-acid free diet (known as Haig's diet) required the elimination of every food containing high amounts of purines that could be metabolized into uric acid. On this diet all meats, legumes and some vegetables were eliminated including asparagus, beans, lentils, mushrooms, peas and whole grain products. Haig's diet became more restricted over time. His original diet included eggs and fish. These were later omitted. Haig advised people to live on "bread stuffs, milk, cheese, and vegetables."

Haig criticized ordinary vegetarian diets as asparagus, beans, lentils and mushrooms contain purines and thus produce uric acid. He recommended his uric-acid free vegetarian diet to athletes. The uric-acid free diet was restricted to cheese, milk, some vegetables, fruits, nuts and white bread. Haig claimed that vegetarians were in error for eating "poisonous things such as peas, beans and lentils. They are twice as poisonous as meat". Haig described rhubarb as a "poisonous and highly acid vegetable". Haig stated that his own diet consisted "chiefly of bread". He condemned tea drinking, commenting that tea drinkers "are simply swallowing uric acid". Haig opposed the consumption of cacao, coffee and tea as they contain xanthine, a purine.

=== Apsley House ===
Haig was attending physician at Apsley House sanatorium in Slough specifically designed to treat disease through the uric-acid-free diet. The house was equipped with a garden, greenhouse and views of scenic countryside. Two of Haig's patients wrote a uric-acid-free cookbook with recipes from Apsley House. The house was demolished in 1970.

== Cancer ==
Haig argued that cancer, gout and rheumatism are allied diseases that are the result of an excess of uric acid and can be treated by dietetic therapy. Haig described cancer as a "rich man's disease", linking the frequency of cancer with the consumption of costly animal foods. He commented that "the great sum of uric acid disease is increasing with the increased consumption of meat and tea, and cancer is steadily increasing with this."

During 1911–1912, Haig attempted to cure several cases of inoperable cancer with his uric-acid free diet consisting of biscuits, fruits and nuts. The patients did not recover but Haig refused to let his theory take the blame. He stated that his patients were either too far advanced or lacked the determination to stay on his diet.

== Reception ==
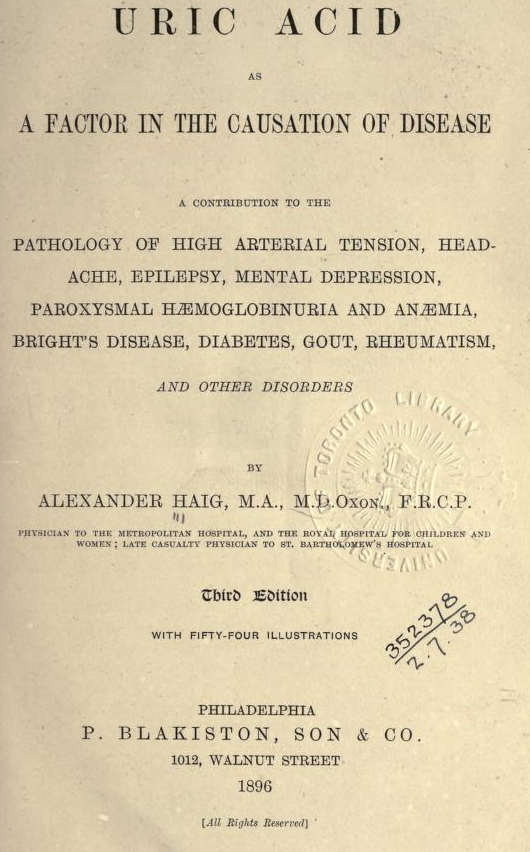
Uric Acid as a Factor in the Causation of Disease, third edition published in 1896

=== Medical community ===
Haig's book received a mixed response from the medical community during late 19th and early 20th century. Some physicians were influenced by Haig's uric acid theories. Physician J. Cuthbertson Walker claimed in The British Medical Journal that he tried Haig's diet for five and a half years. He stated that the diet had made him "almost wholly free" of severe attacks of migraine and rheumatism.

Haig received both criticism and praise from many in the medical profession. Later reviews disputed his thesis that uric acid was the cause of many different types of disease. Haig's uric acid theories were widely cited as a source of debate in medical literature during 1896–1912, especially in the British Medical Journal. However, by the 1920s, his theories were considered discredited by the American Medical Association and were rarely mentioned. In 1935, Carl Malmberg wrote that "although Haig's theory was no longer accepted in scientific circles it continued to exert an influence on the general public as well as on a number of doctors."

Haig's book Uric Acid as a Factor in the Causation of Disease went through many editions and was thoroughly expanded and revised. A 1898 review in the Journal of the American Medical Association suggested that "to those not familiar with the work the book will be a revelation, not only on account of the undisputed facts which the author produces, but for the forceful manner in which they are arranged." A review in the Canadian Journal of Medicine and Surgery supported Haig's research on uric acid and described it as "exceedingly readable". It was positively reviewed in The New Orleans Medical and Surgical Journal as an "honoured place in medicine". A negative review of the fourth edition in the Brooklyn Medical Journal found Haig's views too extreme. For example, the reviewer doubted Haig's assertion that uric acid controls the metabolism and combustion of the body and determines the incidence and course of disease.

A review in the Chicago Medical Recorder for the fifth edition commented that Haig was too extreme in his views but the book should be read by every physician. The New York Medical Journal found the fifth edition too long but concluded that "the book deserves the attention of every physician who would perfect himself in his profession." The Columbus Medical Journal described the fifth edition as "invaluable as a clinical work on the subject".

The fifth edition was described by the Pacific Medical Journal as a "scientific and masterly volume of some 850 pages... the work is thoroughly scientific and trustworthy, and gives us the latest data regarding gout, rheumatism or blood diseases in general. We highly recommend it to every practitioner." The same journal also recommended the sixth edition as "interesting to all scientific physicians". A review in the New York Medical Journal commented that "there can be no doubt that Dr. Haig is an original thinker, and has the courage which goes with conviction. The sixth edition of this work does not disappoint the seeker for further hypotheses." A review for the sixth edition in The New England Medical Gazette, concluded that "this book ought to be owned by every reading physician, and no member of our profession can afford to anything less than a student of good medical literature."

An article in the Journal of the American Medical Association in 1904 objected to Haig's uric acid theories but praised his dietary results. Arthur P. Luff, Francis W. E. Hare and Francis H. McCrudden disputed Haig's uric acid theories in 1905.

A 1908 review in the Journal of the American Medical Association for the seventh edition commented that although the book had a wide influence on English physicians the theories of Haig were repudiated by the scientific world. The reviewer stated that the Haig's theories were erroneous but remained popular due to the conservatism amongst "physicians who hesitate to abandon old views and fail to keep abreast of scientific progress." A review the same year published in the British Medical Journal, commented that Haig's theory of the existence of uric acid in a colloid form was an unsubstantiated hypothesis. The reviewer noted that Haig's original diet included eggs, fish and fruit which he said cured him of his headaches but these were later removed which made the diet too restrictive. In 1909, Alexander Bryce commented that although the uric-acid free diet is a valuable method of treatment for certain patients it is too extreme for ordinary purposes of nutrition in every-day life.

Arthur J. Cramp of the American Medical Association stated in 1914 that Haig's methods were unreliable and his theories are "utterly discredited".

Haig's uric-acid free diet has been cited as an example of a fad diet. Historians have noted that after following Haig's diet which was very restrictive people sometimes succumbed to anaemia.

=== Vegetarian community ===
Haig is cited by historian James C. Whorton as being an important figure in the development of vegetarian nutrition. Although Haig's uric-acid free diet differed to a standard vegetarian diet he was a notable physician to be advocating a fleshless diet in the early 20th century and his theories were widely circulated.

Haig's diet influenced lacto-vegetarians Are Waerland and Eustace Miles. Miles took up Haig's diet claiming multiple health benefits but later gave it up as he found that legumes aided his vitality. Several vegetarian athletes adopted Haig's diet with success. Karl Mann, a German vegetarian walker switched to Haig's diet in 1898 and won an international Dresden-Berlin race in 1902. Haig personally met Mann and examined him after the race. Haig criticized the standard vegetarian diet based on grains and legumes for being low in protein and dissociated his diet from it. In 1908, he commented that "vegetarianism has been a great thorn in my side in advocating, as I do, a physiological and purin-free diet."

Haig was criticized by some vegetarians for condemning legumes, certain vegetables and whole wheat bread. John Harvey Kellogg's journals praised Haig's rejection of flesh foods and uric acid research but advised against Haig's diet. Two uric-acid cookbooks influenced by Haig's research were published in the early 20th-century. These were The Apsley Cookery Book by Mrs. John J. Webster in 1905 and Some Recipes for the Uric Acid Free Diet by Gertrude M. Haig in 1913.

== Selected publications ==
Books

- The Formation and Excretion of Uric Acid (1888)
- Uric Acid as a Factor in the Causation of Disease (1896)
- Diet and Food (1901)
- Uric Acid: An Epitome of the Subject (1904)
- Uric Acid in the Clinic (1910)
- Health Through Diet (with Kenneth G. Haig, 1913)

Papers

- The Relation of a Certain Form of Headache to the Excretion of Uric Acid (Medico-Chirurgical Transactions, 1887)
- Does Uric Acid taken by mouth increase the Excretion of that substance in the Urine? (The Journal of Physiology, 1893)
- The Causation of Anæmia and the Blood Changes Produced by Uric Acid (British Medical Journal, 1893)
- The Formation of Uric Acid and Its Effects on the System (The Hospital, 1894)
- In What Way Do Diet and Drugs which Clear the Blood of Uric Acid affect the Arthritis it Produces? (British Medical Journal, 1895)
- The Uric Acid Diathesis (British Medical Journal, 1896)
- On Uric Acid and Arterial Tension (British Medical Journal, 1899)
- Some Effects Of Diet On The Excretion Of Uric Acid (British Medical Journal, 1896)
- Some Remarks on the Excretion of Uric Acid and Its Relation to Solubility (The Journal of Physiology, 1899)
- Cancer Antecedents (British Medical Journal, 1902)
- Living on Bread (Journal of the American Medical Association, 1902)
- The Causation, Prevention, and Treatment of Gout (Modern Medicine, 1902)
- Some Mistakes Which May Prevent the Best Results of the Uric-Acid-Free Diet (Medical Record, 1908)
- The Origin of Cancer (British Medical Journal, 1909)
- The Nature and Origin of Cancer (British Medical Journal, 1911)
- Gout of the Intestines (Medical Record, 1912)
- Uric-Acid-Free Diet In Inoperable Cancer (British Medical Journal, 1912)

== See also ==
- Carl Lange
- W. A. Potts
