= Greaves Park =

House in Lancaster, England

Coordinates: 54°2′26.948″N 2°47′40.337″W

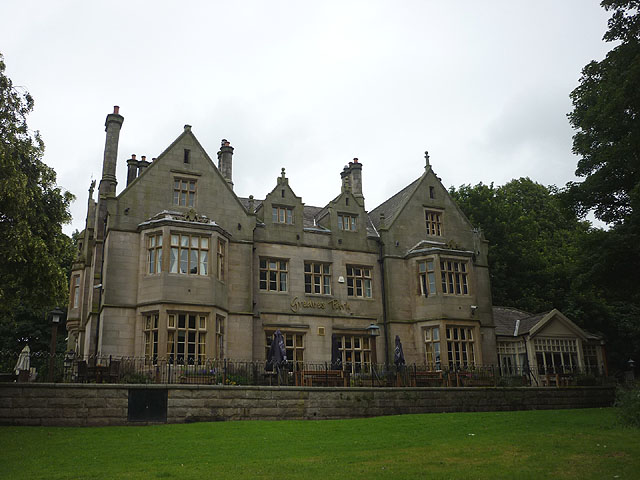
Greaves Park in 2012

Greaves House, now known as Greaves Park, is a Grade II listed house in Lancaster, England, now a pub and restaurant, and is also the name of the surrounding public park. It was built in 1843 by the Reverend Samuel Simpson and was the residence of many notable people for the next century.

== Early history ==
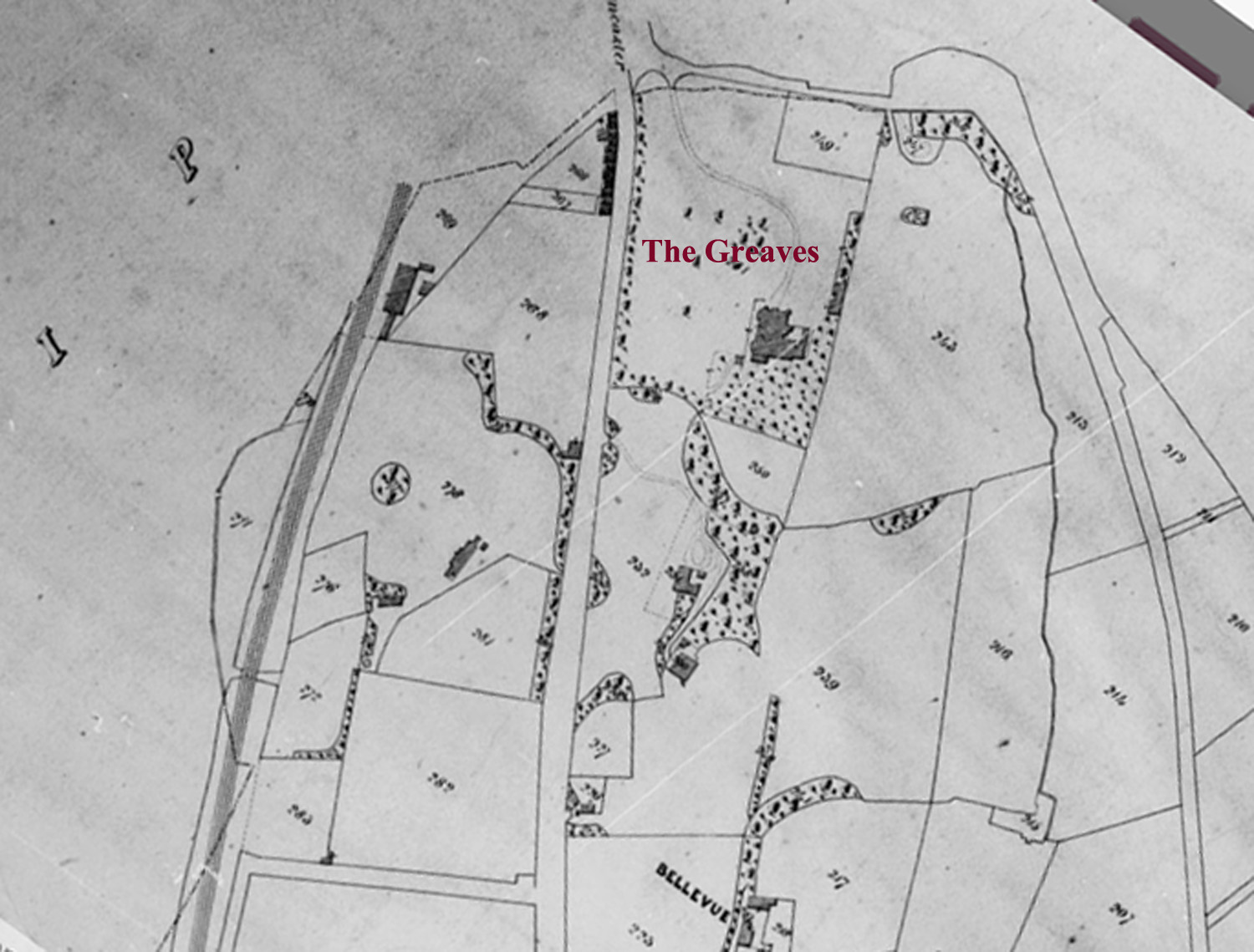
Tithe Map of Greaves Park 1844

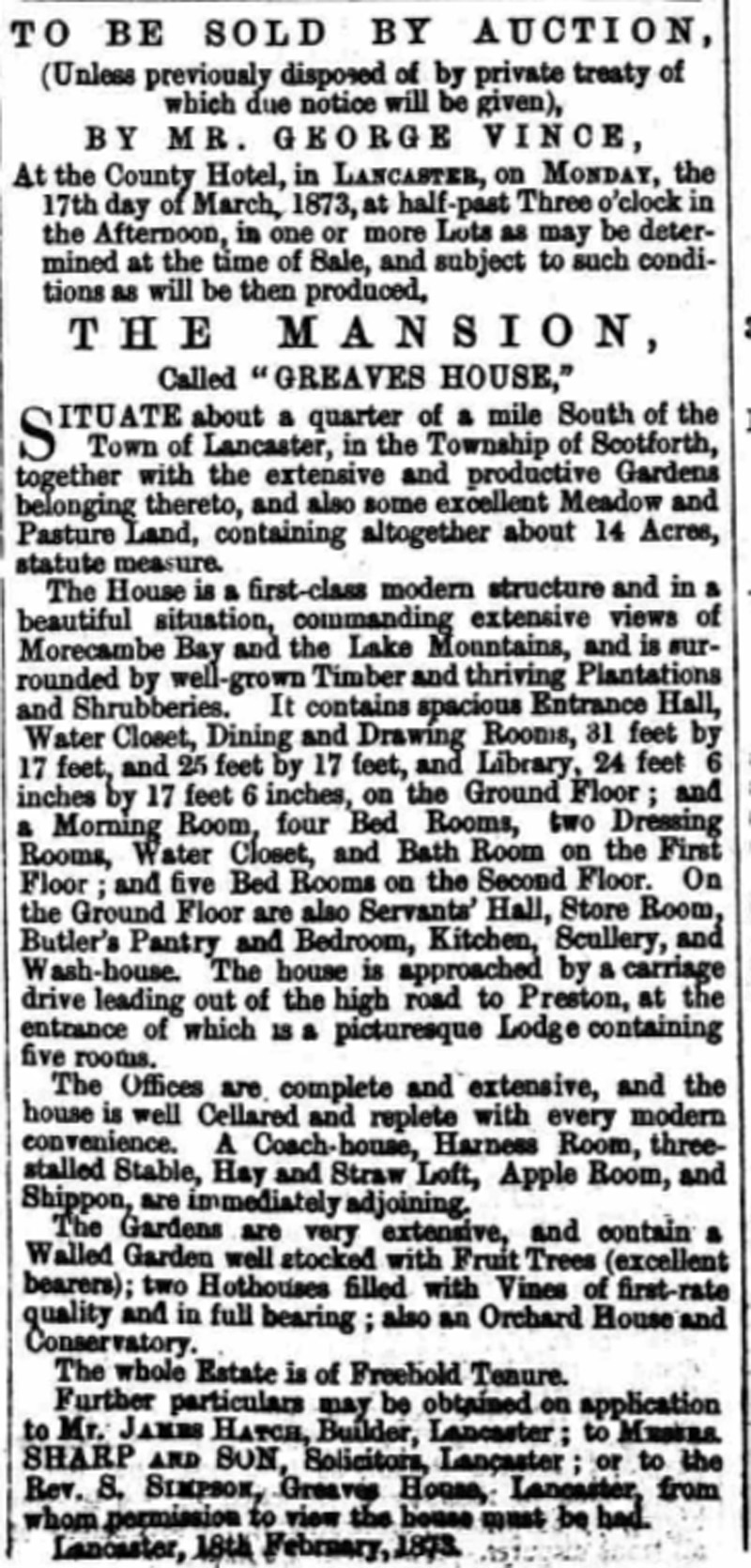
Ad for sale of Greaves House 1873

Samuel Simpson (1802-1881) built Greaves House in 1843. There is a date stone with the family crest of a lion over the entrance. He was born in 1802 in Lancaster. His father was John Simpson, a West Indies merchant. He was trained to be an attorney and for many years he worked in this profession. He was also the Director of the Liverpool and Leeds District Railway.

In 1843 shortly before his marriage, he built Greaves House. At that time it was called "The Greaves". In the following year he married Ann Atkinson who was the daughter of Richard Atkinson of Ellel Grange in Lancashire. The couple had eight children, five boys and three girls.

In 1851 at the age of 49 Samuel decided to become a clergyman. He was ordained by the Archbishop of Canterbury and was appointed as Chaplain to St Thomas Church, Douglas, Isle of Man. He remained there until his retirement in 1867 and then returned to Greaves House in about 1870 and lived there until 1874 when he sold it to Richard Leeming. After that he then went to Bristol to live for some years and then to Kingston House in Chester where he died in 1881 at the age of 78.

During the time that Samuel lived on the Isle of Man he rented the house to wealthy tenants. One of these was Dr Edward Denis de Vitre (1806-1878) who was an eminent physician and was instrumental in the establishment of the Royal Albert Hospital. He and his wife Janet lived there from about 1855 until 1870. He then moved to Elms in Bare near Lancaster and died there in 1878.

In 1873 Rev Samuel Simpson advertised the house for sale. It read as follows.

"The house contains spacious entrance hall, water closet dining and drawing rooms on the ground floor. A morning room, four bed rooms, two dressing rooms and bathroom on the first floor and five bedrooms on the second floor. On the ground floor are also the servant’s hall, storeroom, butler’s pantry and bedroom, kitchen, scullery and washhouse."

"The house is approached by a carriage drive leading out of the high road to Preston at the entrance of which is a picturesque lodge containing five bedrooms. A coach house, harness room, three stalled stable, hay and straw loft, apple room and shippon are immediately adjoining."

== Later residents ==
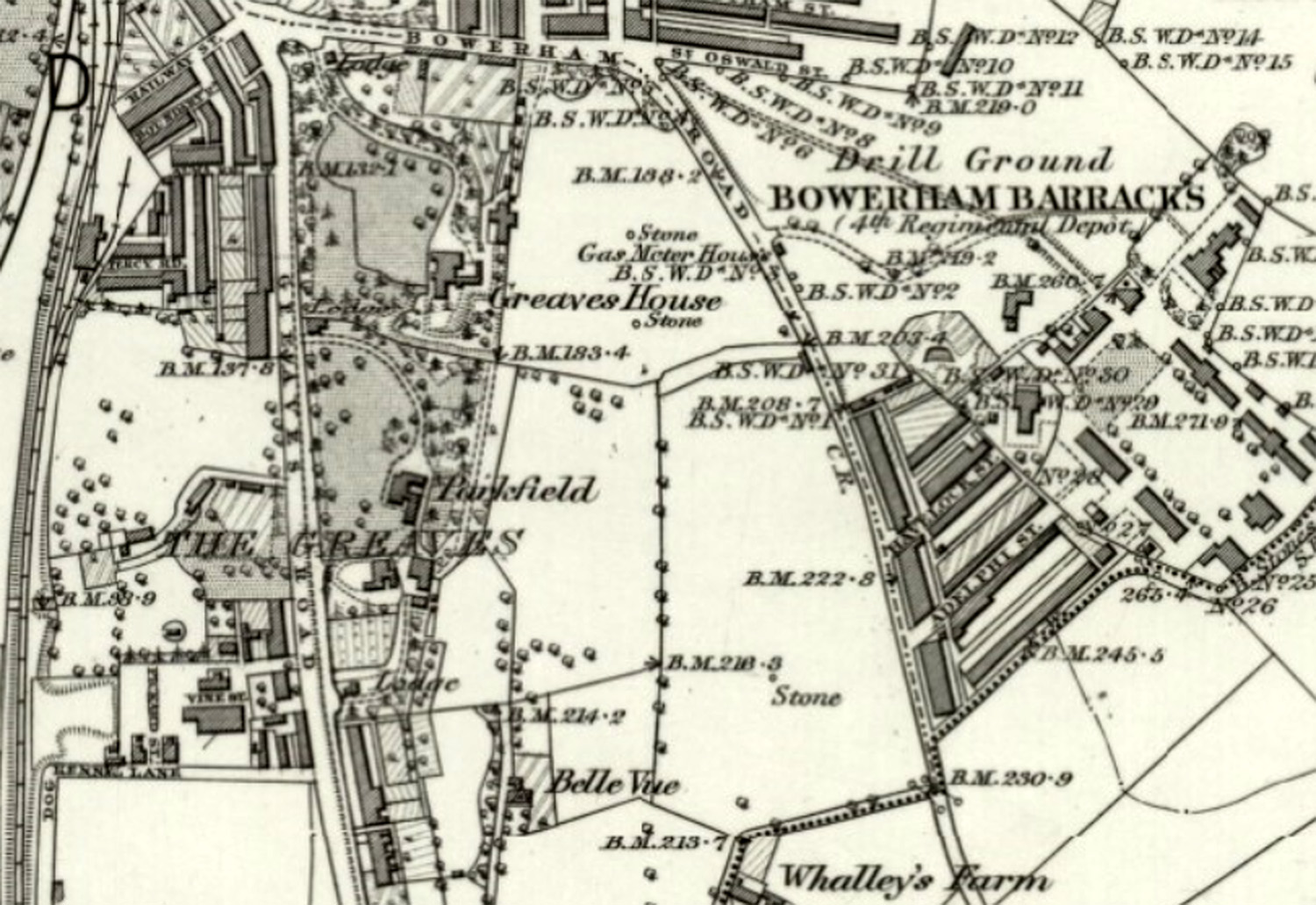
Map of Greaves Park 1891

Richard Leeming (1818-1888) who bought the house in 1874 was an extremely wealthy corn merchant. He was born in 1818 in Lancaster. His father was William Leeming and his mother was Margaret Whiteside. In the 1850s he went into business with his cousin Robert Whiteside to form the company of corn merchants called Whiteside and Leeming which made very large profits. He was also for many years a member of the Lancaster Town Council and Director of the Lancaster Banking Company.

In 1853 he married Eliza Brettaugh and the couple had nine children, four boys and five girls. The family were devout Catholics and donated considerable amounts to Lancaster Cathedral. In 1888 shortly before he died Richard bought the elaborate organ which still exists in the Church today. On the organ loft, just above the central aisle the Leeming family crest can be seen.

Richard died in 1888 and his will allowed the Trustees to sell Greaves House only after the death of his widow Eliza and after that only if there were less than two unmarried daughters wishing to live there. All of Richard's five daughters remained unmarried. Two of them died before 1925 and one of them became a nun. His wife Eliza died in 1890. This left Mary Eliza and Mary Frances living in the house. In January 1937 Mary Eliza died leaving her last sister Mary Frances Leeming no longer legally permitted to live there. In 1938 she moved to Pringle Head in Warton, Lancashire and died there in 1954 at the age of 85.

Once the house became vacant in 1938 it was sold to Lancaster City Council. The Council rented the building to the Post Office Telephones Department (now the Post Office Telecommunications Department) who used it to accommodate their administrative staff. They were granted a lease for three years in 1938 and were still residents in 1957. In the 1960s it became The Loyne School, for children with severe learning difficulties: the school moved to premises in Sefton Drive in Lancaster. It was listed in the Education Committees' Year Book for 1962 as a school named Greave House.

Since 1996, the building has housed a pub-restaurant, which has operated as part of the Chef & Brewer chain since 2019
