= The Apsley Cookery Book =

Vegetarian cookbook published in 1905

The Apsley Cookery Book: Containing 448 Recipes for the Uric-Acid-Free Diet
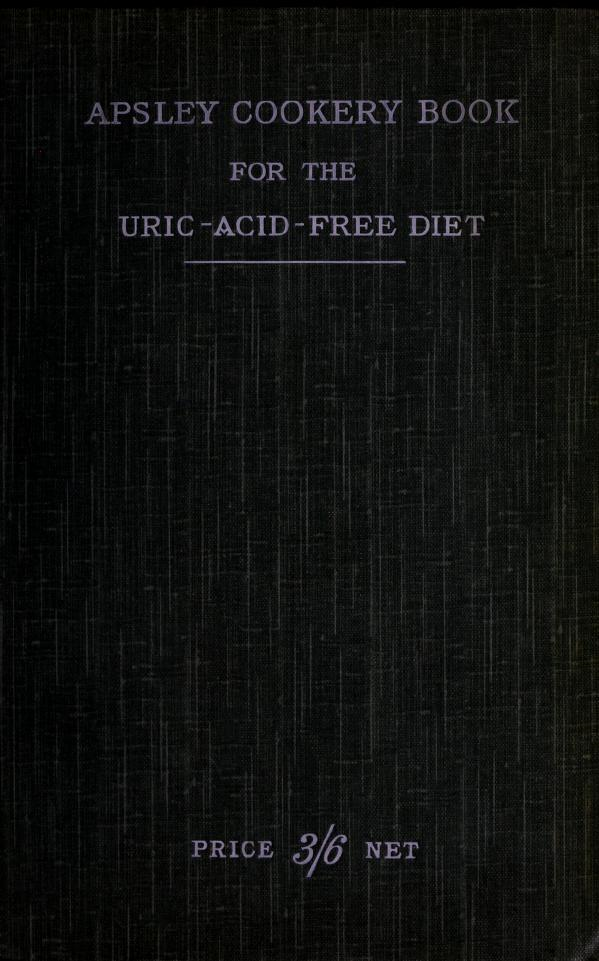
- Author: Mrs. John J. Webster, Mrs. F. W. Jessop
- Language: English
- Subject: Uric-acid free diet, vegetarianism
- Publisher: J. & A. Churchill
- Publication date: 1905, 1914
- Media type: Print
- Pages: 237
- OCLC: 970766930

The Apsley Cookery Book: Containing 448 Recipes for the Uric-Acid-Free Diet is a vegetarian cookbook on the uric-acid free diet written by Mrs. John J. Webster and Mrs. F. W. Jessop, first published in 1905 with a revised edition in 1914.

== Description ==
The cookbook supports the diet theories of Alexander Haig and was "respectfully dedicated" to him. (Note: The cookbook describes itself as "respectfully dedicated to the originator of the uric-acid-free diet".) Mrs. John J. Webster and Mrs. F. W. Jessop were former patients of Haig. Historian James C. Whorton has cited Haig as an important figure in the development of vegetarian nutrition.

Haig suggested that excess of uric acid in the blood may cause depression, epilepsy, and migraines. He came to the conclusion that his headaches and virtually every other disease known to man was caused by excess uric acid including cardiovascular disease, cancer, dementia, gout, hypertension, and stroke. Haig is credited as one of the first physicians to link excess uric acid to hypertension.

The recipes exclude all foods high in purines including all types of meat, legumes, asparagus, mushrooms and eggs yolks. Many of its recipes contain dairy products and are made with cheese, milk, macaroni, rice, potatoes, egg whites, fruit and nuts. In 1914, the cookbook was revised and updated with 50 new recipes.

== Reception ==
A review in The British Medical Journal suggested that it "may be read with advantage by every one, and the recipes are so practical and useful that they would be an addition to the resources of all housewives". A review in the New York Medical Journal commented that "the reader may be astonished and pleased to see how many appetising and delicious dishes can be served without meat, which is rapidly becoming a luxury in this country as it has long been abroad".
