= Edward Denis de Vitre =

English physician (1806–1878)

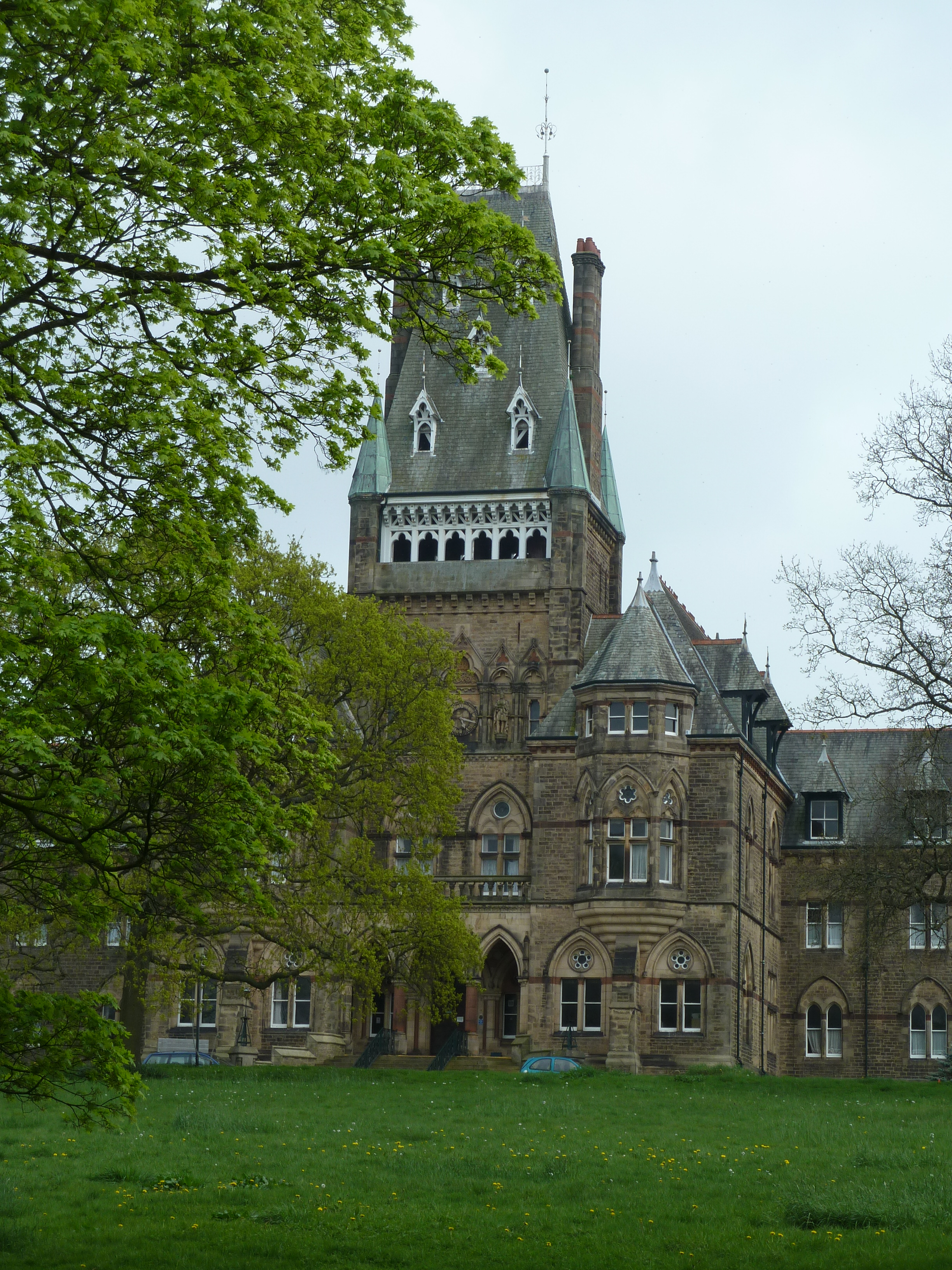
The Royal Albert Hospital, Lancaster

Edward Denis de Vitre (24 March 1806 – 4 October 1878) was an English physician, twice mayor of Lancaster, England, and one of the founders of the Royal Albert Hospital (originally The Royal Albert Asylum for Idiots and Imbeciles of the Northern Counties) in Lancaster.

He was born at Irthington, near Carlisle, and studied at the University of Edinburgh, gaining his MD in 1827. He moved to Lancaster in 1832, and in 1840 became Visiting Physician at the Lancaster County Lunatic Asylum. In 1864, James Brunton offered £2,000 towards a new asylum for "idiots and imbeciles" and asked De Vitre's assistance. De Vitre was the Chairman of the Committee for the new asylum and oversaw its establishment. The foundation stone was laid in 1868 and it received its first patients on 14 December 1870.

De Vitre died at Elms, Bare, Morecambe on 4 October 1878.

In September 2012, a community resource centre for the Lancashire Care NHS Trust, in Ashton Road near the former Royal Albert Hospital, was named DeVitre House in his honour, after a competition in which local residents were asked to choose its name. The hospital itself closed in 1996 and the buildings now house an Islamic educational establishment for girls, Jamea Al Kauthar Islamic College.
