= Alexander Bryce =

Alexander or Alex Bryce may refer to:

- Alexander Bryce (minister) (1713–1786), Church of Scotland minister, mathematician, astronomer, scientist and poet
- Sir Alexander Bryce (British Army officer) (1766–1832), British Army general
- Alexander Bryce (physician) (1863–1942), British physician and dietician
- Alex Bryce (1905–1961), British screenwriter, cinematographer and film director
- Alex Bryce (footballer) (born 1944), Scottish footballer

== See also ==
- Alexander Bruce (disambiguation)
