= Bruce Alexander =

Bruce Alexander may refer to:

- Bruce K. Alexander (born 1939), Canadian psychologist known for research into addiction
- Bruce Alexander (actor) (born 1946), English actor
- Bruce Alexander (American football) (born 1965), American football player
- Bruce Alexander Cook (1932–2003), American journalist and author who also wrote under the pseudonym Bruce Alexander

== See also ==
- Alexander Bruce (disambiguation)
- Bruce Alexander McDonald (1925–1993), officer in the Australian Army
