= Veg nutrition =

Veg nutrition may refer to:

- Vegetable nutrition, see vegetable
- Vegetarian nutrition
- Vegan nutrition
