= Kenneth G. Haig =

English physician and writer (1879–1958)

Kenneth G. Haig MRCS LRCP
- Born: Kenneth George Haig; 20 February 1879; Windsor, Berkshire, England
- Died: 1958 (aged 78–79); Gloucestershire, England
- Occupations: Physician, writer
- Spouse: Hester Boyd (m. 1909)
- Father: Alexander Haig

Kenneth George Haig MRCS LRCP (20 February 1879 – 1958) was an English physician and writer, best known for promoting the uric-acid free diet.

== Biography ==
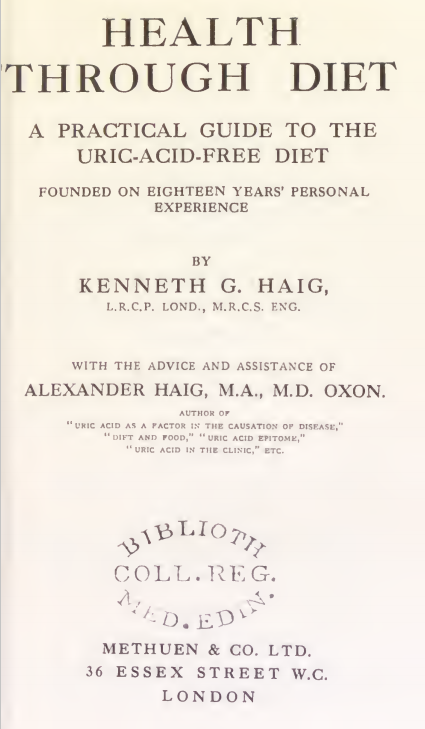
Health Through Diet, published in 1913

Kenneth George Haig was born at Windsor, Berkshire, on 20 February 1879. His father was dietitian and physician Alexander Haig. He married Hester Boyd on 12 October 1909. He was a Captain in the Royal Army Medical Corps from 1914 to 1920.

As was his father, Haig was a proponent of the uric-acid free diet. He wrote about the subject in his book Health Through Diet, which received advice and assistance from his father. Haig argued that excess uric acid was a major cause of disease. For example, he attributed anemia, Bright's disease, cancer, diabetes, heart disease, pneumonia and rheumatism to excess uric acid. Haig stated that the uric-acid free diet greatly improved his health and he had eighteen years of experience on the diet.

The book includes a list of forbidden foods. The uric-acid free diet explained by Haig does not permit foods that are high in purines. On this diet all meat, fish, fowl, egg yolks, beans, lentils, peas, oatmeal, mushrooms, wheat meal, cocoa, coffee and tea are forbidden. The diet allows cheese, milk, cereal foods, rice and some vegetables. Haig wrote that beans, lentils and peas contain large quantities of purines and are poisonous because they produce uric acid. A reviewer in the Journal of the American Medical Association disputed this as "common people have been consuming such substances for ages without showing any ill effects."

A review in The British Medical Journal commented that Haig's uric-acid free diet would be valuable for certain patients but the diet is not "desirable or suitable for general adoption, or that its neglect is accountable for all the diseases he enumerates." A negative review in The Journal of Hygiene stated that the diet is "so singularly unattractive that apart from faddists few persons are likely to be converted to its use, even if that were desirable." In contrast, it was positively reviewed in the Nature journal for "approach[ing] the subject with such wholehearted enthusiasm that he equals, if not excels, that of his father, whose work he continues and extends."

== Selected publications ==
- Uric Acid in the Clinic (with Alexander Haig, 1910)
- Health Through Diet: A Practical Guide to the Uric-Acid-Free Diet (with the advice and assistance of Alexander Haig, 1913)

== Quotes ==
I regard excessive tea-drinking among the lower classes as one of the great factors in causation of the prevalence of alcoholism, in much the same way as meat, tea, etc., amongst the upper classes are the causes of drug-taking. Tea stimulates the tea-taker at first, making him feel very fit and well, but sooner or later (since all stimulation and bracing up are wrong) the inevitable depression must follow; this is driven away either by more or ever stronger and stronger tea, or by alcohol, and so the process starts, the tea being taken more frequently and stronger, with the common (and at the present day increasing) results of morphinism, chronic alcoholism, and insanity, or rheumatism and its congeners. A glass of beer is very much better for a man and less harmful than a cup of tea; I do not advise either, but of the two evils take the lesser one; whisky is better than beer, which is very acid and contains some uric acid in addition. I am afraid this will hardly meet with the approval of the ardent temperance reformer, but it is none the less true. This must not be taken as in any way recommending beer or whisky as a drink, far from it. All I maintain is that tea is much more injurious than spirits or beer, and when tea is recommended as a substitute for spirits or beer.

— Kenneth G. Haig, in 1913
