= W. A. Potts =

British pharmacologist and medical writer

William Alexander Potts
- Born: 1 May 1866; Rugby
- Died: 23 July 1939 (aged 73); Edgbaston
- Occupations: Pharmacologist, medical writer

William Alexander Potts (1 May 1866 – 23 July 1939) M.D., M.R.C.S. was a British pharmacologist, physician and medical writer.

Potts was born at Rugby on 1 May 1866. He was educated at Pembroke College, Cambridge and University of Edinburgh. He graduated M.B. in 1895 and M.D. with honours in 1898.

Potts began his scientific career at East Riding Mental Hospital and later went into general practice where he remained for twenty years. He was resident medical officer at East Riding Mental Hospital, resident surgeon to Edinburgh Royal Infirmary and resident physician to the Royal Hospital for Sick Children. He was appointed chief medical investigator for the Royal Commission on the Care and Control of the Feeble-minded in 1906. Potts was active in promoting the passage of the Mental Deficiency Act 1913.

He was a medical adviser to Birmingham Mental Deficiency Committee and assisted the police courts with cases of mental deficiency. He was a medical adviser to the Royal Albert Institution. Potts was assistant lecturer in pharmacology at the University of Birmingham. Potts co-authored Mentally Deficient Children: Their Treatment and Training with G. E. Shuttleworth. The book was positively reviewed and went through many editions.

Potts died in Edgbaston.

== Selected publications ==
- The Advantages of a Purin-Free Diet (1905)
- Notes on Purin-Free Diets (1906)
- The Feeding of Young Children (1906)
- A Purin-Free Dietary (1908)
- Mentally Deficient Children: Their Treatment and Training (1916)
- The Mentally Defective and the Unstable Brought Before the Courts (1920)
- Crime and Delinquency (1929)
- Mental Deficiency and Venereal Disease (1933)
