= Alexander Bruce =

Alexander or Alex Bruce may refer to:

- Alexander Bruce, Earl of Carrick (died 1333), illegitimate son of Edward Bruce, younger brother of Robert the Bruce
- Alexander Bruce, 2nd Earl of Kincardine (1629–1681), Scottish inventor, politician, judge and freemason
- Alexander Romanovich Bruce (1704–1760), Imperial Russian Army general
- Alexander Bruce (stock inspector) (1827–1903), Australian stock inspector and farmer
- Alexander Balmain Bruce (1831–1899), Scottish churchman and theologian
- Alexander Campbell Bruce (1835–1927), American architect
- Alexander Bruce (politician) (1839–1917), New Zealand engineer, trade unionist and politician
- Alexander Low Bruce (1839–1893), founder of A. L. Bruce Estates
- Alexander Bruce (neurologist) (1846–1911), Scottish surgeon and psychiatrist
- Alexander Bruce, 6th Lord Balfour of Burleigh (1849–1921), Secretary for Scotland
- Sir Alexander Carmichael Bruce (1850–1926), assistant commissioner of the Metropolitan Police
- Alexander B. Bruce (1853–1909), Scottish American baker and politician
- Alexander Livingstone Bruce (1881–1954), businessman in colonial Nyasaland
- Alex Bruce (rugby union) (John Alexander Bruce, 1887–1970), New Zealand rugby union player and cricketer
- Alex Bruce (footballer, born 1952) (Alexander Robert Bruce), Scottish footballer
- Alex Bruce (footballer, born 1984) (Alex Stephen Bruce), English and Northern Irish footballer
- Alex Bruce (footballer, born 1998), English footballer, currently playing in the United States
- Alex Bruce (rapper) (born 2006), Filipino rapper and songwriter
- Alexander "Demruth" Bruce, creator of the video game Antichamber

== See also ==
- Alexander de Brus (1285–1307), brother of Robert I of Scotland
- Alexander Bryce (disambiguation)
- Alexandra Bruce (born 1990), Canadian badminton player, known as Alex
