= Francis W. E. Hare =

Irish physician

Francis Washington Everard Hare (1858 – 9 December 1928) was an Irish physician and low-carbohydrate diet advocate.

== Biography ==
Hare was born in Dublin. He studied medicine at St. Thomas's Hospital and St Mary's Hospital, London. He obtained his M.R.C.S in 1879, M.B. in 1884 and M.D. in 1891 from Durham University.

Hare worked in Australia and was medical superintendent of Charters Towers Hospital and resident medical officer of the Brisbane General Hospital. He returned to England in 1904 and was medical superintendent of Norwood Sanatorium for over twenty years.

Hare died in Beckenham on 9 December 1928.

== The Food Factor in Disease ==
Hare authored the two-volume The Food Factor in Disease (1905), which suggested that excessive consumption of carbohydrate foods could result in a condition he termed "hyperpyraemia". He attributed hyperpyraemia to the occurrence of many disorders including asthma, gout, hypertension, obesity and migraines.

Hare defined hyperpyraemia as an excess of carbonaceous material or fuel to the bloodstream from consuming too many carbohydrate foods. He recommended a high-protein low-carbohydrate diet that was high in animal protein and restricted starch, sugar and alcohol. He was influenced by the diet of James Salisbury. Hare believed that some instances of migraine were a "food disease" and his diet could alleviate "migrainous" headaches. In the second volume he documented cases of patients being cured by carbohydrate restriction. However, medical experts criticized the concept of hyperpyraemia because it was not clearly defined and Hare provided no direct evidence for its existence.

In 1906, a review in the British Medical Journal concluded that "we cannot regard the theory of hyperpyraemia as possessing any sound basis, nor can the author expect it to be considered seriously until he has given a clearer definition of what he means by excess of fuel substances in the blood, and has produced some direct evidence of their presence." Hare's book was criticized in the Edinburgh Medical Journal. The reviewer noted that hyperpyraemia has no chemical basis or evidence to support it and that he did not have a proper theory, only an assumption. A mixed-review in the Bristol Medico-Chirurgical Journal concluded that "the work is one of very great interest, and contains much that is original in thought, although some of the hypotheses prove untenable."

Hare's views were not accepted by the medical community but his book influenced those in the field of clinical ecology.

== Selected publications ==
- The Food Factor in Asthma: Hyperpyraemia (1905)
- The Food Factor in Disease (two-volumes, 1905)
- On Alcoholism: Its Clinical Aspects and Treatment (1913)
