= Jamea Al Kauthar =

School in Lancaster, England

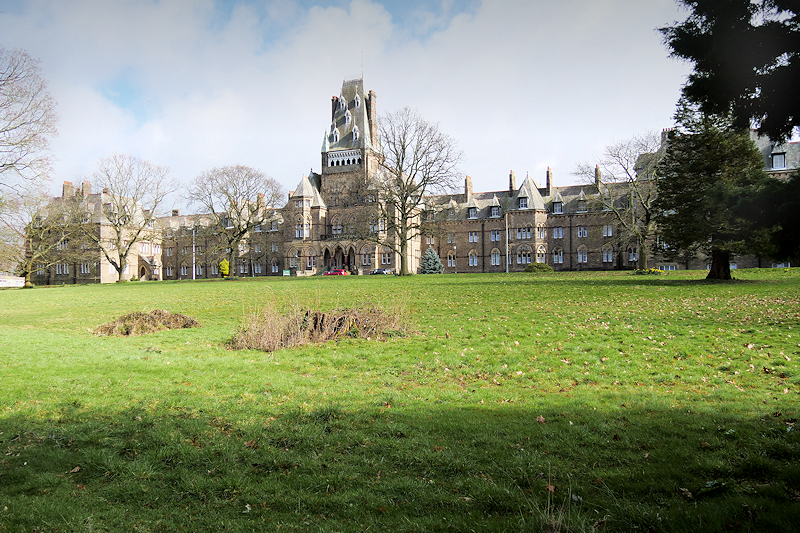
- The building in 2019
- Founded: 1996 (29 years ago)
- Headquarters: Ashton Road, Lancaster, England
- Website: www.jamea.co.uk

Jamea Al Kauthar is an independent academic girls' establishment located in the former Royal Albert Asylum in Lancaster, Lancashire, England, educating girls in a Muslim tradition over the age of 11. Jamea Al Kauthar started with 60 pupils in 1996 and now has the capacity to cater for up to 450 students. Jamea Al Kauthar adopted and converted the Royal Albert Hospital historic building in 1996, on its conversion, received the moral and financial support of various members of the community.

== History ==
Since its inception, the school has grown in its intake, accepting both British and EU pupils. The school employs both residential and non-residential staff, and offers the following: the traditional six-year Alimiyyah course, a two-year abridged version of the Alimiyyah course known as Sanatayn, GCSEs, A-Levels and other vocational courses. Alongside the curriculum, pupils benefit from a number of extra-curricular initiatives such as fundraising for local and international charities, hosting visiting speakers, and getting involved with local campaigns.

Jamea Al Kauthar also has a sister boarding school in Preston for boys, known as Darul Uloom Preston. The boarding site also has a nearby educational site for the pupils day-time and evening studies, known as Abrar Academy.

== Objectives ==
- To teach students to acquire an in-depth understanding of Deen.
- Developing the love for Allah and his Prophet.
- Instilling religious and moral values, tolerance of other races and religions.
- Producing individuals who have the capacity to think for themselves, to know their own minds but to have the flexibility to listen to others.
- Encouraging pupils to appreciate the needs of others and be sensitive to them, to work in teams and be able to recognise right from wrong.
- Encouraging students to respect and abide by the rule of law and be an exemplary citizen.

== See also ==
- Royal Albert Hospital, a previous use of the main building.
