= Alexander Bruce (stock inspector) =

Alexander Bruce (1827–1903) was an Australian farmer and stock inspector. He was notable for introducing precautions against animal diseases affecting cattle (e.g. anthrax, scab) into Australia from the 1860s, and was himself a farmer at Chatswood, Sydney, New South Wales.

He was born in Aberdeenshire, Scotland and attended Marischal College, Aberdeen. He emigrated to Australia in 1852.
