= New York Medical Journal (1865) =

- Discipline: General medical
- Language: English

Standard abbreviations
- ISO 4: N. Y. Med. J.

Indexing
- CODEN: NYMJAQ
- ISSN: 0097-319X
- OCLC no.: 01639507

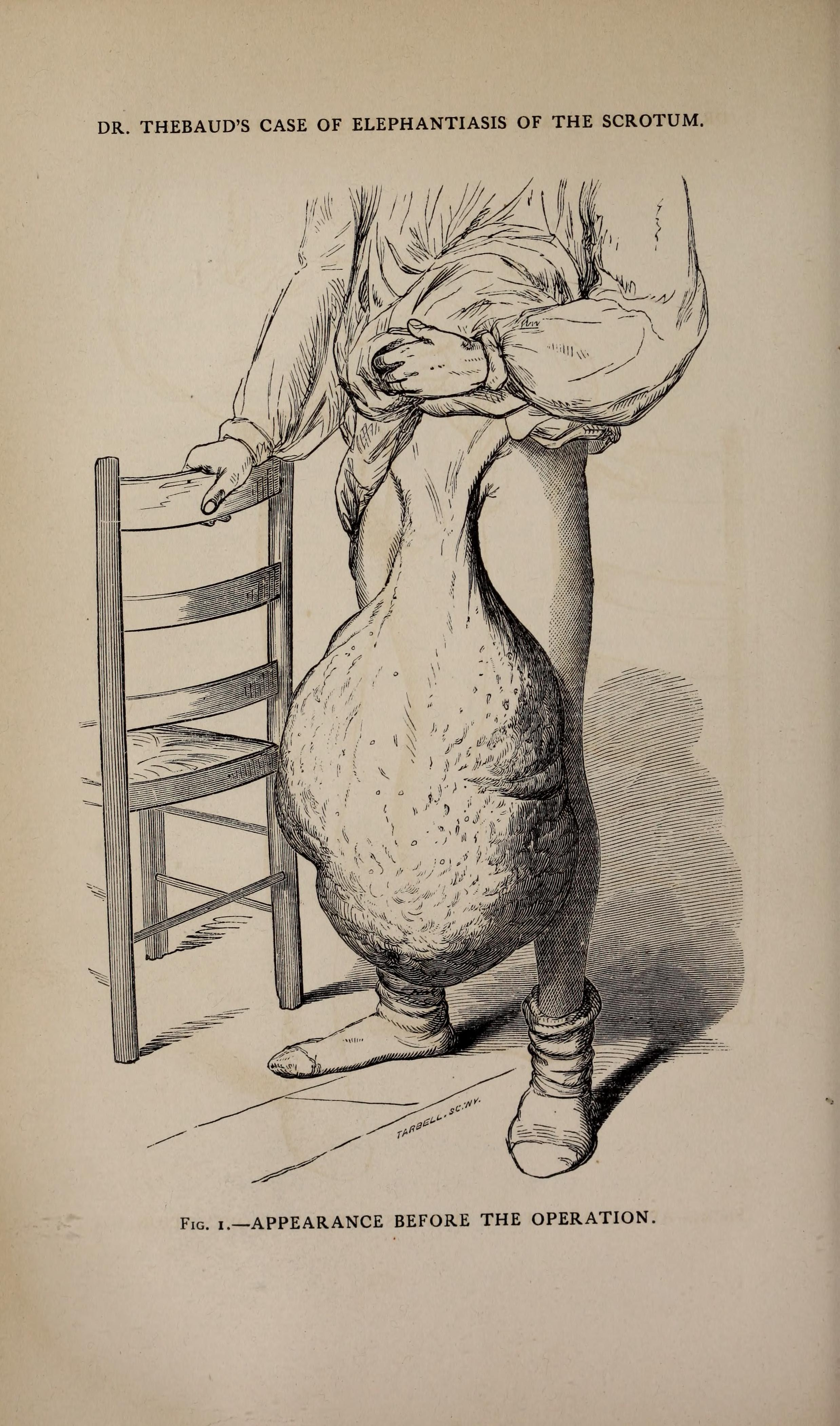
Full-page engraved illustration of elephantiasis of the scrotum from the May 1867 issue

The New York Medical Journal is an American medical journal. It was first published in 1865.
