= Alexander Bryce (physician) =

Scottish physician and dietitian

- Born: 4 April 1863
- Died: 7 June 1942 (aged 79); Moseley
- Occupations: Physician, dietitian

Alexander Bryce (4 April 1863 - 7 June 1942) was a Scottish physician and dietitian.

Bryce was born on 4 April 1863. He graduated M.B. with honours from Glasgow University and won the Brunton Memorial Prize in 1886. He obtained his M.D. in 1893 with honours. After graduation he was House-Surgeon to the Paisley Infirmary and Fever Hospital for several years. In 1894 he began practicing medicine in Birmingham and developed an interest in dietetics.

In 1923, he was appointed as chief medical officer for an insurance company where he remained until his retirement in 1939. Bryce's The Laws of Life and Health was described in a review by the Journal of the American Medical Association as "one that the physician can conscientiously recommend to his patients because of the sterling common sense which characterizes it and the absence of "fads" and "notions." A review by the British Medical Journal stated that medical practitioners and the public would profit from reading the book but suggested that some of his advice was impractical such as his condemnation of drinking at meals. The work was popular and went through several editions.

His Modern Theories of Diet examined various diets and fad diets. It was positively reviewed. A reviewer in The Lancet described it as a "valuable volume for general practitioners."

Bryce was an advocate of autointoxication and authored a book on the subject in 1921. He died in Moseley, aged 79.

== Selected publications ==
- Bryce, Alexander (1 December 1906). "Why Physical Culture Fails". Maclean's. Archived from the original on 21 July 2019.
- The Limitations of a Purin-Free Diet (1908)
- A Personal Investigation Into The Dietetic Theories Of America (1909)
- Modern Theories of Diet and Their Bearing Upon Practical Dietetics (1912)
- The Laws of Life and Health (1912)
- Dietetics (1913)
- Intestinal Toxaemia Or Autointoxication In The Causation Of Disease (1921)
