= Royal Albert Hospital =

Former hospital in Lancaster, Lancashire, England

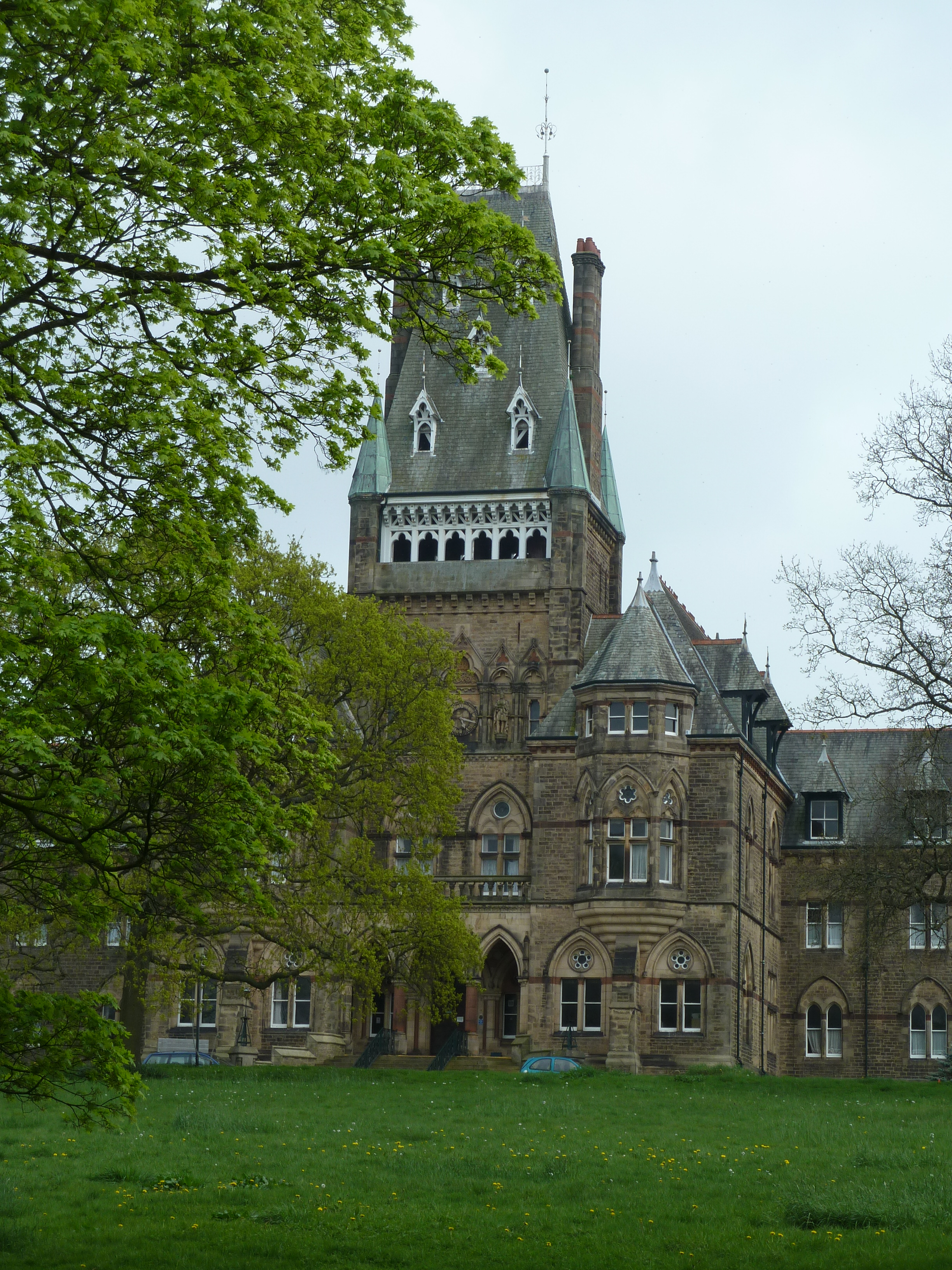
- Central section of the Royal Albert Hospital

- Location within Lancaster

General information
- Architectural style: Gothic Revival
- Location: Ashton Road, Lancaster, Lancashire, England
- Coordinates: 54.0336°N 2.8008°W
- Year built: 1868–73
- Opened: 1870
- Governing body: Jamea Al Kauthar

Design and construction
- Architect: E. G. Paley

Listed Building – Grade II*
- Official name: Royal Albert Hospital (original part only)
- Designated: 30 November 1970
- Reference no.: 1194930

Listed Building – Grade II
- Official name: Lodge to Royal Albert Hospital
- Designated: 30 November 1970
- Reference no.: 1219861

The Royal Albert Hospital was a hospital in Lancaster, Lancashire, England. It opened in 1870 as an institution for the care and education of children with learning problems. By 1909 there were 662 children in residence. Following new legislation in 1913, adults were also admitted. By the time of the introduction of the National Health Service in 1948 the hospital had 886 patients, and by the 1960s there were over 1,000 patients. Following legislation in the 1980s, the patients were relocated in the community, and the hospital closed in 1996. The building was acquired by Jamea Al Kauthar Islamic College to provide Islamic education for girls. The main part of the hospital is recorded in the National Heritage List for England as a designated Grade II* listed building, and its west lodge is listed at Grade II.

== History ==
The hospital was built between 1868 and 1873, and designed by the local architect E. G. Paley. Its original name was "Royal Albert Asylum for idiots and imbeciles of the seven northern counties". An additional building, the Winmarleigh Recreation Hall was built at the rear of the hospital and designed by Paley, Austin and Paley (E. G. Paley in partnership with his son, Henry, and with Hubert Austin). In 1898–1901, following the death of E. G. Paley, the practice (now Austin and Paley) designed a new south wing, named the Ashton wing.

The hospital was established under the Lunacy Act 1845, at a time when there was little understanding of the difference between learning disability and mental illness, to provide care and education for children with learning disabilities. It took patients from the seven northern counties of England between the ages of 6 and 15. It was a voluntary hospital, whose financial provision came entirely from public subscription. The foundation stone was laid in 1868. The first patients entered the hospital in December 1870, and in August 1871 the first girls were admitted. By 1874 it had 196 patients. In 1884 the hospital was renamed as the "Royal Albert Asylum for the Care, Education and Training of Idiots, Imbeciles and Weak-Minded children and Young Persons of the Northern Counties". By 1909 there were 662 patients in residence, 85 per cent of whom were aged under 15. During the following year the hospital was renamed again, this time to "The Royal Albert Institution, Lancaster".

Following the Mental Deficiency Act 1913, the nature of the hospital changed, as it was determined that no more than 10 per cent of its patients should be under the age of 16. In 1948 the hospital became part of the National Health Service, and its name was changed to "Royal Albert Hospital". By this time it had 886 patients, of whom 45 per cent were aged over 35, and only 12 per cent were under 15. In 1958 two new blocks were built, each containing 54 beds, to accommodate the increasing number of patients. By the middle of the 1960s the hospital contained over 1,000 patients. From the 1980s, Care in the Community legislation led to the relocation of patients into the community, so that by 1990 only about 500 patients were still resident. Further relocation of patients led to the closure of the hospital in 1996. The building was acquired by Jamea Al Kauthar Islamic College for use as an educational establishment for Muslim girls.

== Architecture ==
=== Exterior ===
The main building is constructed in sandstone with ashlar dressings and bands of red sandstone from St Bees. The roofs are in green slate from Coniston. Its architectural style is Gothic Revival. Hartwell and Pevsner in the Buildings of England series describe its appearance as that of a hôtel de ville (French town hall). The main front of the building is symmetrical, in two storeys with attics and a basement. The roofs are hipped, and incorporate dormer windows. The front consists of a central block of six bays, with eleven-bay wings on each side. In the centre of each wing is a three-bay canted projection, and at both ends is a wider three-bay pavilion under a separate roof. In the wings, most of the windows on the ground floor are pairs of lancets under an arched hoodmould, and most of the windows on the upper storey have two lights under a flat lintel. The windows in the projections and pavilions are more ornate, most of them consisting of a triple lancet under an oculus. The dormers contain cross casement windows, and on the summits of the dormers are finials. On the ground floor of the central block is a porch with three arches carried on red sandstone columns. Above the porch on the first floor is a canted oriel window. Behind the porch and rising above it is a three-stage tower. In the middle stage is a clock face flanked by statues in Longridge stone of Queen Victoria and Prince Albert, carved by Bridgeman of Lichfield. The statues stand in an arcade of trefoiled arches. At the four corners of the tower are turrets, and the roof of the tower is steeply pitched, containing three tiers of gabled dormers. To the rear of the building are two further wings, each comprising eight bays with three-bay pavilions at their ends.

=== Interior ===
Inside the central block is a triple arch behind which is an imperial staircase with an ornate wrought iron balustrade. The roof timbers are exposed, and the hall is lit from above. Beyond this is a five-bay hall with two-light transomed windows. The windows contain small pieces of stained glass depicting badges of the benefactors of the hospital. Also in this hall are galleries.

=== West lodge ===
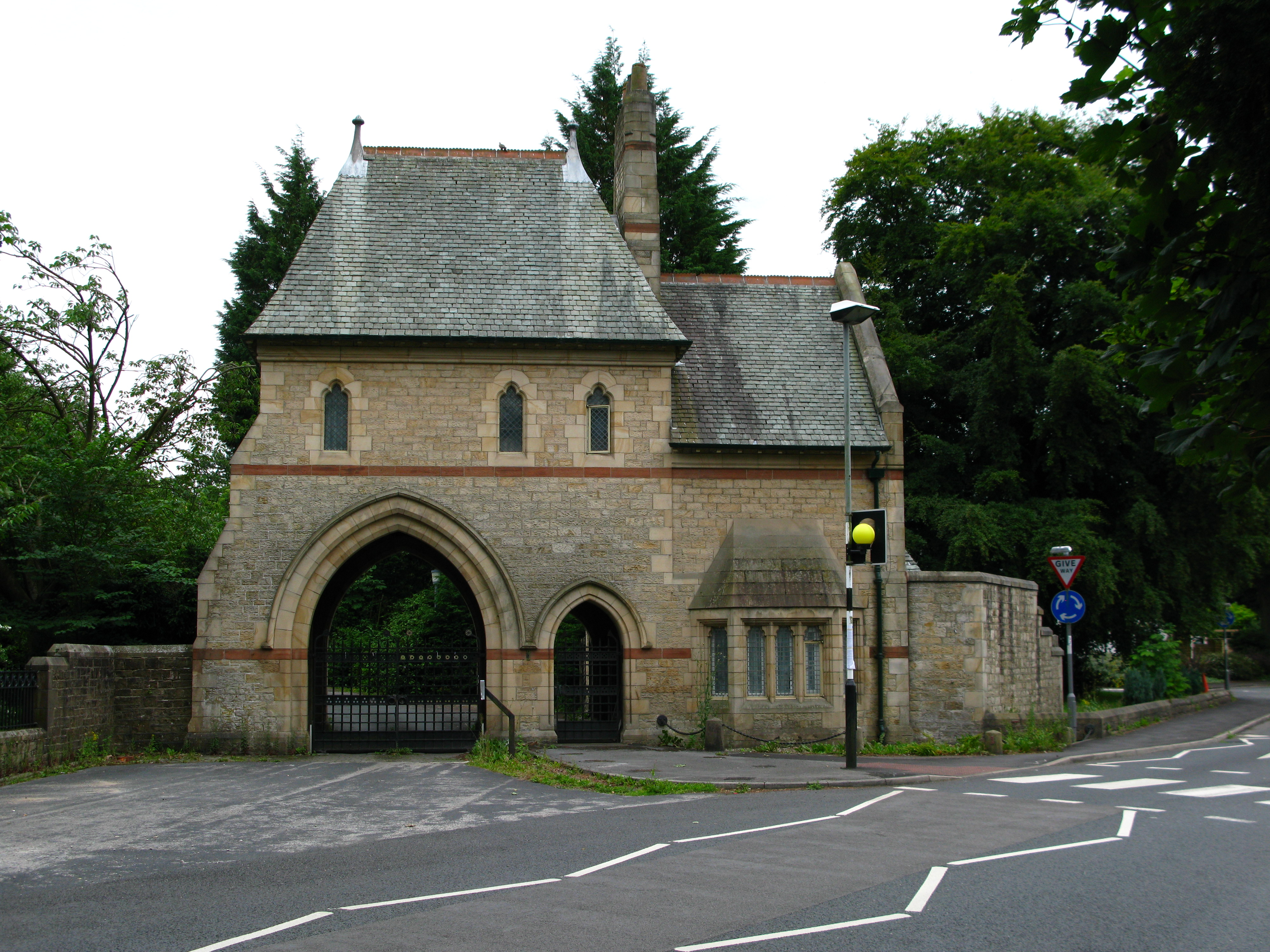
West lodge

On Ashton Road at the entrance to the drive to the former hospital is a lodge, built in about 1873. It is also constructed in sandstone with ashlar dressings, red sandstone bands, and green slate steeply pitched roofs, and is in Gothic Revival style. The main part of the lodge is in two storeys, and contains a wide arch for the carriageway, and a smaller narrower arch for pedestrians. On the upper storey are three trefoiled single-light windows. The roof is hipped and carries lead finials. To the right of this is a chimney with bands of red sandstone. On the right of the building is a short lower wing with a coped gable. On the gable side is a two-light stair window above a quatrefoil, and another two-light window. Facing the road is a canted bay containing mullioned windows. The lodge is entered from the pedestrian walkway.

== Recent history ==
The main part of the hospital was designed as a Grade II* listed building on 30 November 1970, the same date the west lodge was listed at Grade II.

Since 1996 the building has been used as the Jamea Al Kauthar Islamic College, a boarding school that educates girls over the age of eleven. Originating with 60 girls, as of 2011 it has about 400 residential students on its roll. The students attend Islamic theology courses in the morning in the college, and in the afternoons travel to Preston Sixth Form College to study other subjects.

== See also ==
- Grade II* listed buildings in Lancashire
- Listed buildings in Lancaster, Lancashire
- List of non-ecclesiastical works by E. G. Paley
