= List of Martinians =

The following is a list of notable Martinians, former pupils and masters of the three schools established by Claude Martin.

- La Martiniere Calcutta in Kolkata, India
- La Martiniere Lucknow in Lucknow, India.
- La Martiniere Lyon in Lyon, France

La Martinière Lyon was divided into three independent colleges in the 1960s:

- La Martiniere Monplaisir in Lyon, France
- La Martiniere Duchère in Lyon, France
- La Martiniere Diderot in Lyon, France

== Notable Martinians: Calcutta ==
=== Science ===
- Gagandeep Kang, vaccine scientist at CMC Vellore (known as India’s 'vaccine godmother'), first Indian woman to be elected as a Fellow of Royal Society, London

=== Business and finance ===
- C. K. Birla ('73 batch), industrialist
- Catchick Paul Chater (1863 batch), trader and entrepreneur in Hong Kong
- Vijay Mallya ('72 batch), fugitive billionaire businessman, chairman of United Breweries and Kingfisher Airlines and a Rajya Sabha MP
- Harshavardhan Neotia, chairman of Ambuja Neotia Group
- Hemant Kanoria, industrialist, chairman and managing director of Srei Infrastructure Finance Limited
- Pramod Bhasin, founder and first CEO of Genpact, pioneer of BPO industry in India
- Suhel Seth ('82 batch), advertising and marketing
- Asma Khan ('87 batch), restaurateur

=== Sports ===
- Chhanda Gain, first Bengali woman to climb Mount Everest
- Leander Paes ('92 batch), tennis player, medalist at the 1996 Summer Olympics in Atlanta, multiple Tennis Grand Slam doubles champion, captain of the Indian Davis Cup team
- Khokhan Sen (‘43 batch), India Test cricketer, 14 Test caps
- Anne Lumsden, field hockey player, Arjuna Award-winner
- Anush Agarwalla (2018 batch), equestrian sports
- Rahil Gangjee ('97 batch), pro golfer

=== Education ===
- John Mason ('62 batch), winner of the Good Conduct Medal, schoolmaster and educationist
- Nirmalya Kumar, professor of marketing and management, art collector

=== Arts, culture and entertainment ===
- Merle Oberon ('28 batch), Hollywood actress
- Nafisa Ali (‘72 batch, House Captain), actress and winner of Miss India contest 1975
- Pandit Bikram Ghosh ('84 batch), tabla player
- Kiran Rao, filmmaker, producer
- Pritish Nandy ('63 batch), poet, journalist and film producer
- Rajiv Mehrotra ('69 batch), documentary filmmaker, television anchor
- Nilanjana Roy (‘89 batch), author and critic
- Anuvab Pal ('95 batch), comedian, author and scriptwriter
- Adrit Roy, actor

=== Government ===
- Saiyid Nurul Hasan, historian, Union Minister of Education and former Governor of West Bengal, India

=== Journalism ===
- Swapan Dasgupta ('71 batch), journalist, columnist and former managing editor of India Today
- Sunanda K. Datta-Ray, former editor of The Statesman
- Jug Suraiya ('62 batch), associate editor of the Times of India, author and columnist
- Sanjoy Narayan, journalist, editor-in-chief of the Hindustan Times
- Ashok Malik ('88 batch), journalist, official spokesman for the President of India '17 to '19
- Paranjoy Guha Thakurta ('71 batch), journalist
- Prannoy Roy, TV presenter and founder of NDTV
- Indrajit Hazra ('90 batch), author and columnist

=== Politics ===
- Mausam Noor, MP, North Malda, West Bengal, elected 2009
- Chandan Mitra ('71 batch, Gold Medalist), Member of Parliament, journalist

== Notable Martinians: Lucknow ==
The list of Old Martinians from the Lucknow School includes:

=== Business ===
- Shahnaz Husain, beautician and entrepreneur

=== Education ===
- Frederick James Rowe, poet, former English teacher at the Lucknow school and composer of the official school song Hail Hail the Name we Own

=== Entertainment ===
- Ali Fazal, Indian television and film actor
- Roshan Abbas, TV and radio host
- Muzaffar Ali, painter, clothing designer and film director /producer.
- Priyanka Chopra, actress and former Miss World in 2000
- Namita Dubey, TV and web actress
- Pankhuri Gidwani, actress and former Miss Grand International 2016
- Amit Sadh, Indian television and film actor
- George Baker, Indian TV and film actor

=== Government ===
- Isha Basant Joshi, I.A.S.; the second lady officer in the Indian Administrative Service and the first Indian girl to be admitted to the Girls' College
- K. Raghunath, former Foreign Secretary of India and Indian Ambassador to Russia

=== Journalism ===
- Akash Banerjee, journalist, radio jockey and political satirist
- Vinod Mehta, magazine editor
- Saeed Naqvi, journalist
- Siddharth Varadarajan, founder of The Wire and former editor of The Hindu

=== Military ===
- FS Hussain, Pakistani Air Commodore
- Abrar Hussain, Pakistani Major General

=== Musicians ===
- Munni Begum, Pakistani Gazal singer

=== Literature ===
- Krishna Prakash Bahadur, writer, poet and philosopher
- Mukul Deva, auto didact and polymath, ex-army officer, author, keynote speaker, consultant and entrepreneur
- Attia Hosain, journalist and writer
- Allan Sealy, author of The Trotter-Nama, short-listed for the Booker Prize
- Ruchita Misra, author
- Srijan Pal Singh, author
- Rajesh Talwar, author, former UN staff

=== Politics ===
- Nawab Sir Sayyid Hassan Ali Mirza Khan, KCIE, the first Nawab of Murshidabad
- Arun Nehru, political analyst, ex-minister and columnist
- Ali Khan Mahmudabad, historian, professor of political science at Ashoka University, member of Samajwadi Party
- Aditya Yadav, MP from Samajwadi Party

=== Science and technology ===
- Praveen Chaudhari, physicist, pioneer in superconductor research, and recipient of National Medal of Technology
- Rajendra K. Pachauri, chairman of the Intergovernmental Panel on Climate Change (IPCC), shared the 2007 Nobel Peace Prize with Al Gore

=== Sports ===
- Vece Paes, Olympian

=== Others ===
- Anjali Gopalan, founder and executive director of The Naz Foundation (India) Trust, an NGO dedicated to the fight against the HIV/AIDS epidemic in India; 2012 Time Magazine list of the 100 most influential people in the world
- Edward Hilton, author of an eye-witness guide to the siege of Lucknow
- Charles Palmer, civil engineer and survivor of the siege of Lucknow

== Notable Martinians: Lyon ==
=== Business ===
- Inabata Katsutarō, industrialist and pioneer of japanese cinema
- François Gillet, textile and dye industrialist of Lyon
- Jean-Michel Aulas, businessman, president of Olympique lyonnais

=== Entertainment ===
- Lumiere Brothers, two of the first filmmakers
- Alexandre Promio, pioneer of cinema

=== Literature ===
- Frédéric Dard, writer and author of the San-Antonio series
- Henri Béraud, novelist and journalist, won the Prix Goncourt in 1922

=== Art and architecture ===
- Tony Garnier, the forerunner of 20th century French architects
- Étienne Pagny, noted French sculptor who studied Architecture at La Martiniere Lyon and later practiced as a sculptor

== See also ==
- La Martiniere Calcutta
- La Martiniere College
- La Martiniere Lyons
- La Martiniere Lucknow
- Claude Martin
- The will of Claude Martin
