= Martinian =

Martinian (in Latin, Martinianus) can refer to:

- Roman emperor Martinian
- Claude Martin, the French adventurer
- A former pupil of one of the three schools founded by Claude Martin: La Martiniere Calcutta, La Martiniere Lucknow and La Martiniere Lyon.

Several Christian saints share that name:

- Saint Martinian, martyr of Rome: see Martinian and Processus,
- Saint Martinian, one of the Seven Sleepers of Ephesus.
- Saint Martinianus (bishop of Milan), reigned 423–435
- Saint Martinian of Byelozersk, Greek Orthodox saint, father superior of Troitse-Sergiyeva Lavra
- Saint Martinian of Areovinchus, Greek Orthodox saint, monk
- Saint Martinian, Greek Orthodox saint, monk of Zograf Monastery killed along with 26 others in 1275.
