= Martin Purwa =

- village
- Location in Uttar Pradesh, India Martin Purwa (India)
- Coordinates: 26.841°N 80.960°E
- Country: India
- State: Uttar Pradesh
- District: Lucknow

Population (2007)
  - Total: 4,000

Languages
  - Official: Hindi
- Time zone: UTC+5:30 (IST)

Martin Purwa, also known as Martinpurwa or Martinpura) is a neighbourhood of the city of Lucknow in the state of Uttar Pradesh, India. It is part of the Vikramaditya ward. Martin Purwa has a population of around 4,000. It is part of the La Martiniere College estate. Its previous name was 'Luckperra'.

It is named after Claude Martin, the eighteenth-century French adventurer and philanthropist, who served both the East India Company and the Nawab Asaf-Ud-Dowlah of Oudh.

The village was originally inhabited by the staff of Claude Martin and it provided labour and other services to the La Martiniere School. The hereditary daroga (superintendent) of the La Martiniere estate still has a house in the village.

Martin Purwa has benefited from its close proximity to the Lucknow Golf Club and has produced so many good golfers that it is known locally as the 'nursery of golf'. The inhabitants of the village don't recall precisely when their association with the game began. According to village folklore a gora sahib (white man) was walking through the village one day with his retinue, and was puzzled to see some boys playing a game with curved sticks and wooden balls which they hit towards holes. The gentlemen was apparently so impressed by their game that he asked some of the older children to follow him to the golf club and work as caddies, a tradition which has continued ever since. Some of the village boys have since gone on to play the game professionally and a number have enjoyed success at a national level.

Nearly 60 villagers of Martin Purwa make their living from golf, and the local boys continue to work at the club as caddies.

The Lucknow Golf Club acknowledged Martin Purwa's contribution to the game by opening up a school for the village children in 1998.

== Notable residents ==
- Vijay Kumar, India's number one golfer, also worked as a caddie at the golf club. He was the first Indian professional to earn one million rupees.
- Gyan Sagar, the only national certified golf teaching professional (coach) in the club, from National Golf Academy Of India, Indian Golf Union.

== See also ==
- Claude Martin
- La Martiniere College
- La Martiniere Lucknow
- Lucknow
- Budh Mandir
