= Ashok Malik =

Indian columnist

Ashok Malik is Partner and Chair of the India Practice at The Asia Group, a business and strategic advisor firm headquartered in Washington, DC. He is former policy advisor/additional secretary in the Ministry of External Affairs, government of India, having served in that position from October 2019 to August 2022. While in that role, he was the highest ranked non-career civil servant in the Ministry. He was also a member of prestigious Padma Award committee 2023.

== Background ==
From 1 August 2017, to 31 July 2019, Malik served as press secretary to the President of India. He relinquished office after his two-year term came to an end.

Prior to joining government, Malik was a distinguished fellow at the Observer Research Foundation, a public policy think-tank based in India. As a columnist, he wrote for a publications such as Times of India and Hindustan Times.

Born in 1969, Malik studied at La Martiniere Calcutta (Kolkata), and graduated from Presidency College (now University) in the same city. He began his career in the Telegraph newspaper in Calcutta in 1991 and subsequently was associated with other publications such as Times of India, India Today and Indian Express.

In 2006, he embarked on a career as a self-employed columnist. In 2015 he joined the Observer Research Foundation. In 2016, he was awarded the Padma Shri, India's fourth-highest civilian honour.
