= Indrajit Hazra =

Indian journalist and author

- Born: 1971 (age 54–55); Calcutta
- Occupations: Journalist, Novelist

Indrajit Hazra is an Indian journalist and author of the books The Bioscope Man and Grand Delusions: A Short Biography of Kolkata published by Aleph Book Company in 2013.

== Early life ==
He was born and raised in Kolkata and studied at La Martiniere Calcutta and Jadavpur University.

He is currently editor of Hindustan Times
