= Charles-Henri Tabareau =

French physicist and educator

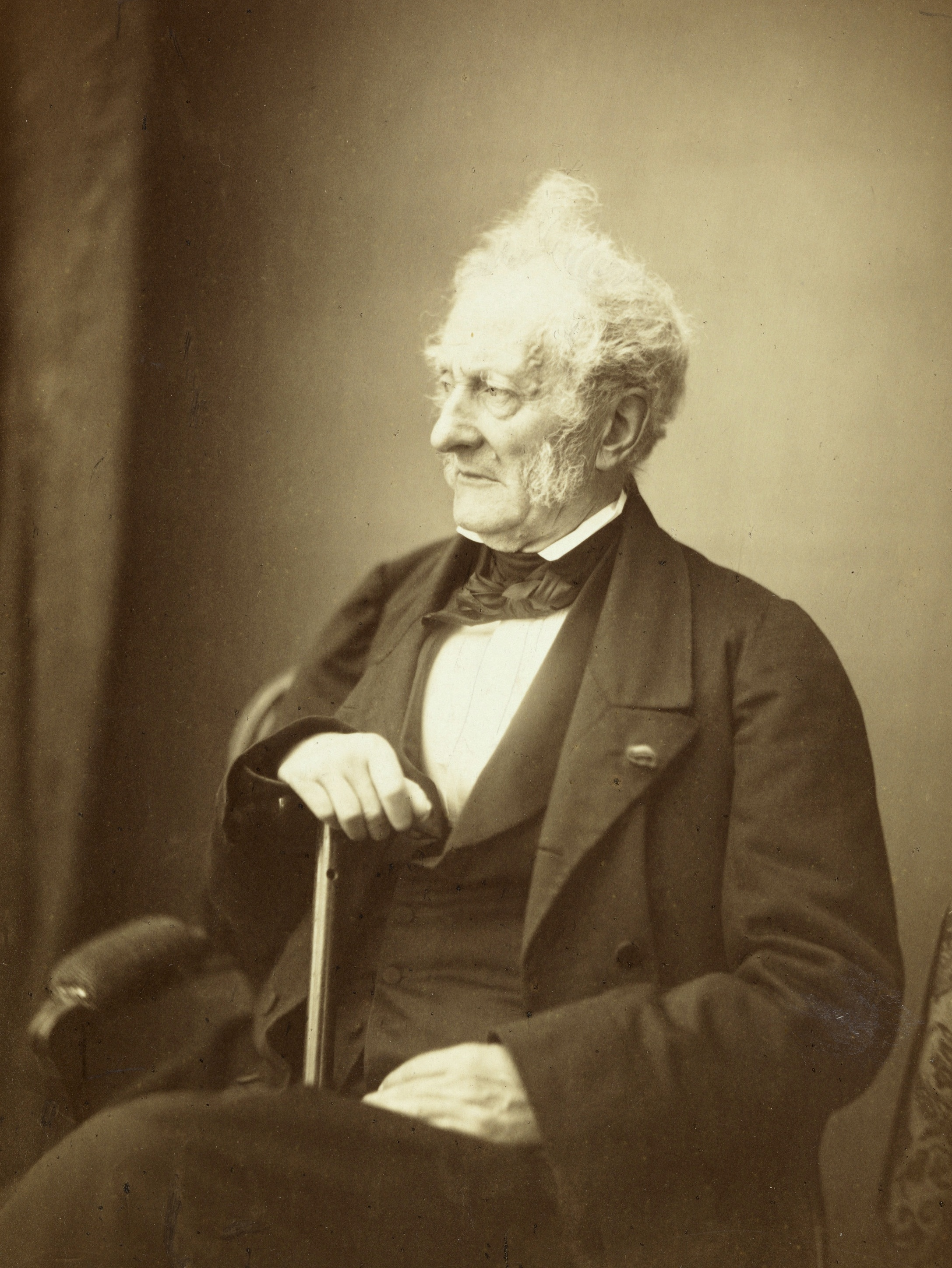
- Born: January 26, 1790; Béziers, France
- Died: August 15, 1866 (aged 76); Lyon, France
- Education: École Polytechnique
- Scientific career
- Fields: Physics
- Workplaces: University of Lyon

Charles-Henri Tabareau (born 26 January 1790 in Béziers and died 15 August 1866 in Lyon) was a French physicist and educator.

A graduate of the École Polytechnique and dean of the Faculty of Sciences of Lyon, he participated in founding the La Martinière School in Lyon, where he was the first director and implemented a pedagogical method that later became known as the "Tabareau method".

== Biography ==
Charles Henry Tabareau was born in Béziers on 26 January 1790. His father, Jean Joseph Tabareau, was the director of the postal service there. The family originated from Tours, with his great-grandfather Jean (born 1702) from a family of silk merchants. Charles Henry's grandfather, Nicolas Jean Gatien Tabareau (Tours 1725-Lyon 1803), was the director of the postal and lottery services in Lyon and corresponded with Voltaire.

Charles Henry Tabareau studied in Toulouse, passed the entrance exam for the École Polytechnique in 1808, and graduated in 1811. After making allegiance to Napoleon in 1815, he was placed on half-pay after the Hundred Days. Moving to Lyon, he attempted various jobs: he taught chemistry at Place Sathonay and worked in a chemical products company where he employed his nephew, Désiré Girardon, the first director of the École centrale de Lyon.

On 28 November 1854, in Annonay, he married Marie Adélaïde Bravais (1810–1908), daughter of François Victor Bravais (1764–1852), a doctor in Annonay, and Aurélie Adélaïde Thomé (1774–1814). Marie Bravais was the sister of the physicist Auguste Bravais, whose thesis Tabareau supervised.

Charles Henry Tabareau died on 15 August 1866 at his home at 1, rue Saint-Joseph (now Rue Auguste Comte) in Lyon. He is buried in the cimetière de Loyasse.Dürr 2017, p. 1244

=== Founding the La Martinière School in Lyon ===
Baron Rambaud, mayor of Lyon, entrusted Tabareau in 1825 with the mission of founding the school envisioned by Major General Martin. Tabareau submitted a report on 1 November 1825 and a second one on 28 February 1826 to the new mayor of Lyon, Jean de Lacroix-Laval. Lacroix-Laval tasked Tabareau with setting up and directing a temporary school that lasted five years before the permanent establishment was put in place.

Tabareau devised and tested a manual teaching method that was published in 1828 and later known as the "Tabareau method." According to Louis David

He can rightfully be considered the true initiator of La Martinière

He was elected on 2 December 1823 as a full member of the Académie des sciences, belles-lettres et arts de Lyon, and on 3 August 1824, he delivered his inaugural speech, which

dealt with geology and particularly the inner composition of the globe and mineral wealth.Dürr 2017, p. 1245

=== The Tabareau Method ===
Tabareau is renowned for his pedagogical method for teaching mathematics.

=== Honors and awards ===
Charles-Henri Tabareau was appointed knight of the Legion of Honour on 1 May 1831, then promoted to officer of the same order on 16 August 1850.

He is one of the four figures represented on the Monument aux Grands Hommes de la Martinière.

=== Membership in learned societies ===
- Académie des sciences, belles-lettres et arts de Lyon: member from 1823 to 1866.Dürr 2017, p. 1245.
- Committee on Historical and Scientific Works: corresponding member in 1858.
- Society of Agriculture, Industry, Science, Arts and Fine Letters of the Loire: corresponding member in 1855.
- Linnean Society of Lyon: founding member in 1822.

=== Publications ===
- Speech delivered by Mr. Tabareau at the inauguration of the Theoretical School of Arts and Crafts known as La Martinière, Lyon: Perrin, 1826, p. 15, Charles Henry Tabareau, Exposé de la méthode Tabareau, Lyon, Louis Perrin, 1863, 47p.
- Report presented to the Mayor of Lyon by Mr. Tabareau, professor of physics, former engineering officer and student of the Polytechnic School on the project of organizing a school of arts and crafts in application of the testamentary provisions made in favor of the city of Lyon by Major General Martin, Lyon: Perrin, 1826.
- Exposé of a new experimental method applied to the popular teaching of sciences, known as the manual method, Lyon: Perrin, 1828, p. 40.
- Report to the Royal Academy of Sciences, Belles-Lettres and Arts on a new loom suitable for weaving fabrics invented by Mr. Guigo, by a commission composed of MM. Eynard, Cochet, Artaud, Régny, Tabareau, rapporteur, Lyon: Brunet, 1828.
- Report on the aspirating and pressing pump presented by Mr. Dubois to bring water to the foot of buildings in case of fire, Le Précurseur, no. 232, 1829.
- On the construction of the beams of silk looms. Note read to the Royal Academy of Sciences, Belles-Lettres and Arts of Lyon in its sessions of 20 July and 3 August 1830, Lyon: Louis Perrin, 1830, p. 12.
- On the discovery of a new law that determines the action of fixed alkalis on silicate of lime. Excerpts from a report presented to the Royal Academy of Sciences, Belles-Lettres and Arts of Lyon, Revue du Lyonnais, 1840.
- The magnetic properties of sea water, Revue du Lyonnais, 1842.
- Notice on the life and works of M. Auguste Bravais, 1857.
- Excerpt from a study of the different means employed to prolong human life. Historical and literary note on the testaments of the Romans and the Middle Ages. Extracts from a study on the different means employed to prolong human life, 1857.
- Collection of the works of the Scientific, Literary, and Industrial Association of Lyon, vol. 2, Lyon: Barret, 1863.
- Biography of Gaspard Monge, 1865.

== See also ==
- La Martinière Lyon
