= The Bioscope Man =

- Author: Indrajit Hazra
- Language: English
- Genre: Novel
- Publisher: Penguin Books India
- Publication date: 1 May 2008
- Publication place: India
- Media type: Paperback
- Pages: pp 308
- ISBN: 9780143101741

The Bioscope Man is the third novel of Indian author Indrajit Hazra. It is set in Calcutta and stitches early 20th century Indian cultural and cinema history with the farcical story of Abani Chatterjee to conduct a darkly comic investigation of the phenomena of pretending, lying and acting. It was published by Penguin Books India on 1 May 2008, and was translated into French the following year by Marc Amfreville. The French translation was entitled Le Roi du Cinéma Muet and was published by Le Cherche Midi.

== Plot summary ==
The Bioscope Man is the recollections of Abani Chatterjee, a washed-out silent-era movie actor, who, through this book, makes a bid to convince the reader that misfortune and bad taste of the times conspired to turn him into a non-entity.

As Calcutta's star begins to fade, with the capital of His Majesty's India shifting to Delhi, Abani's is on the rise. He is well on his way to becoming the country's first silent-screen star. But just as he is about to find fame and adulation, absurd personal disaster strikes, and Abani becomes a pariah in the world of the bioscope. In a city recently stripped of power and prestige, and in a family house that is in disrepair, he spins himself into a cocoon of solitude and denial, a talent he has inherited from both his parents.

In 1920, German director Fritz Lang comes calling to make his "India film" on the great 18th century English Orientalist Sir William Jones. When Abani is offered a role, he convinces Lang to make a bioscope on Pandit Ramlochan Sharma, Jones' Sanskrit tutor, instead. Naturally, Abani plays the lead. The result is The Pandit and the Englishman, a film that mirrors the vocabulary of Abani's life, hinting at the dangers of pretence and turning away, the virtues of lying and self-deception, the deranging allure of fame and impossible affections.

Afterwards, Abani writes a long letter, in which he tells his story. The Bioscope Man is that story.

== Characters ==
- Tarini Chatterjee: Abani's father, a senior clerk at East Indian Railway.
- Shabitri Chatterjee: Abani's mother, a housewife.
- Adela Quested: Daughter of Tarini's boss at Great Eastern Railway, Edward Quested
- Shombhu Lahiri (Shombhu-mama): Abani's uncle, chief projectionist at the Elphinstone theatre, who introduces him to the bioscope world.
- Durga Devi/Felicia Miller: Actress who would co-star in bioscopes with Abani.
- Lalji Hemraj: Businessman who starts the Alochhaya Theatre and Bioscope Company.
- Fritz Lang: Austrian filmmaker who comes from Berlin to Calcutta to make his "India film".
- William Jones: 18th century English scholar of ancient Indian texts and founder of the Asiatic Society.
- Ramlochan Sharma: Sanskrit and grammar tutor to William Jones.
- Anna Maria Jones: Wife of William Jones.
- Kuli: Girl who conducts daily chores for Ramlochan.

== Reception ==
Brinda Bose wrote in India Today, "journalist and novelist Indrajit Hazra's The Bioscope Man sneaks us adroitly past the cameras of the silent film industry and exposes with a wacky and trenchant black humour the bathos, the pathos and the incredible magic of the moving image in the heart of Bengali-land about a hundred years ago. There is no denying that Hazra's third novel is as much a paean to Calcutta as it is to cinema, but refreshingly, it is never sentimental, crisscrossed as it is continually by an incisive, rigorous irony of vision and verbal play that serves to remind us that the city, somewhat like the pictures that it throws up on celluloid, is at least partially what we make of it—or make up about it."

Madhu Jain of the Hindustan Times wrote, "While the author has woven many themes into the novel - a critique of Orientalism, a portrait of the Bengali bhadralok in Victorian India, self-deception, the birth and infancy of silent movies - it is the marvellously drawn portrait of the actor whose rapid rise and fall marks him. The actor's reflections upon his life and work are riveting."

The Book Review magazine praised Hazra's craft of telling a powerful story and his use of English language in a creative and artistic manner in its review of The Bioscope Man. "The Bioscope Man is the longest and most ambitious of his three books," the magazine wrote, "but Hazra does not disappoint. Far from it. In fact, he proves without a doubt that this country can produce English writers in whose hands the language is a hundred-eyed beast, shimmering with myriad coloured scales, tamed and trained to turn reading into a fast moving motion of coherently flowing images....Hazra should be read for his prose alone. But he also knows how to tell a meaty story with deft techniques... The Bioscope Man is a ragingly powerful story."

The French translation of the novel was reviewed on the La PAL D'Heclea literary blog. The blog said, "Moi qui aime, par moments, sortir de ma zone de confort (comprendre les romans policiers, les thrillers et de temps en temps de la fantasy), on peut dire que j'ai été on ne peut plus gâtée! Pour commencer, j'ai adoré l'écriture, magnifique (bon j'ai lu une traduction, mais je pense que le fond est tout de même là), j'ai relu certaines phrases plusieurs fois, pas parce que je ne comprenais pas mais juste pour le plaisir... et il est rare que je m'arrête dans ma lecture pour me dire "Wahouh c'est super bien dit"..."

== Previous works ==
Before publishing The Bioscope Man, Indrajit Hazra also published The Burnt Forehead of Max Saul (Ravi Dayal Publisher, 2000) and The Garden of Earthly Delights (India Ink, 2003). Both of these novels were also translated into French.
