= Sanjoy Narayan =

Indian journalist

- Born: Calcutta, India
- Occupation: Journalist
- Years active: 1982- Present

Sanjoy Narayan is the former Editor-in-Chief of the Hindustan Times, a national English language newspaper in India. He held the position between 2008 and 2016.

== Education ==
Narayan attended La Martiniere Calcutta and has a degree in Economics from Presidency College, Kolkata

== Career ==
Narayan began his career in 1982. He has worked at Businessworld, The Economic Times and The Telegraph of Calcutta as a writer, reporter and editor. Later, Narayan was editor of Business Today, India's largest business magazine for nearly ten years. Narayan is credited with turning around the publication and driving its journey to the top. While working with the Economic Times in the early 1990s he helped launch Brand Equity and created and headed the Economic Times' first corporate bureau. Later, he headed the Mumbai bureau of BusinessWorld. While at Business Today, Narayan was also Editorial Director of several other projects and helped launch the Indian editions of the magazines Men's Health and Golf Digest. He also served as Chief Operating Officer of India Today Group Digital, the India Today Group's multimedia initiative in the digital domain.

At Hindustan Times, Narayan led what is the newspaper's first major attempt to relaunch and reposition itself, including a brand new design as well as a new editorial content strategy. The newspaper emerged as Delhi's foremost newspaper with the highest readership among English newspapers. During the period, the paper's five-year-old Mumbai edition emerged as the second largest English newspaper in that city. Narayan also revamped its website and launched it on platforms such as the Kindle and the iPad. Narayan was also a frequent commentator on current affairs, business and politics in a regular column, Simply Put.

== Personal ==
Narayan is passionate about contemporary music. He writes a fortnightly column, in the Hindustan Times' Sunday magazine. He has two daughters.
