= Jan Bhavan, Lucknow =

Residence of the Governor of Uttar Pradesh

- Interactive map of the Jan Bhavan, Lucknow area

General information
- Coordinates: 26.8409°N 80.9463°E
- Owner: Government of Uttar Pradesh

References
- website

Jan Bhavan, formerly Raj Bhavan (translation: Governor's House) is the official residence of the governor of Uttar Pradesh. It is located in the capital city of Lucknow, Uttar Pradesh. The current tenant is Anandiben Patel, the 20th governor of Uttar Pradesh.

The Jan Bhavan of Uttar Pradesh in Lucknow is over 200 years old.

== History ==
Raj Bhavan used to be Kothi Hayat Baksh (Hindi: कोठी हयात बकश, Urdu: کوٹھی حیات بکش). Major General Claude Martin drew the layout of this building.

In the year 1798, after Nawab Asaf-ud-daula died, the East India Company made Sadaat Ali Khan the new ruler. The new ruler liked buildings built up in European style by Major General Claude Martin. As per his wishes the contract for construction of the Kothi was undertaken by Major General Claude Martin.

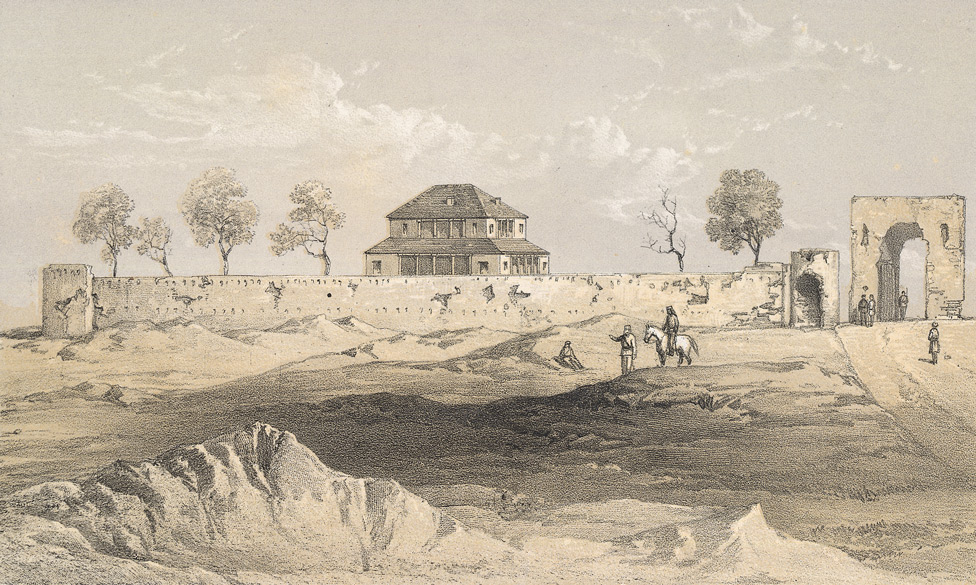
The house in 1857

Major General Claude Martin made the Kothi his residence and he used this building for his safety guards and also for the safety of his armory.

Before India's independence Kothi Hayat Baksh was declared the Government House, the official residence of the Governor of United Provinces from 1921 to 1947.

After independence its name was changed to Raj Bhavan. In 2026, the name was changed to Jan Bhavan.

== Building ==
The two storied palatial building of Lucknow city was constructed in the eastern side of the city surrounded by greenery. Hayat Baksh means, life giving. The buildings constructed under influence of East India Company were different from traditional Indian style of architecture and these buildings were called Kothis. In Indian style of architecture, it was essential to have courtyard in the house, for which no provision has been made in Kothis. Kothis normally were two storied, with long straight plain wall without any design. The only place for artistic work were the doors and windows, decorated in the Gothic style.

Kothi Hayat Baksh is an airy palatial building with all four sides surrounded with high roofed varandas. Only Raj darbar inside the Kothi is made as per Indian art and sculpture, whereas remaining portion of the Bhavan is completely influenced by western style. The mehrab of Dewan khanas are decorated with flower strips and are painted beautifully with golden colour.

In 1873 under the direction of Sir George Cooper beautiful lawns, fountains and also beautiful sitting rooms were attached

In 1907, one portion of this Kothi was demolished and a ballroom was also added. The ballroom is now a dining hall.

== See also ==
- Government Houses of the British Indian Empire
