= Anne Lumsden =

Indian hockey player

Personal information
- Nationality: Indian
- Born: Bengal, British India

Sport
- Country: India
- Sport: Field hockey

Anne Lumsden, is a former Indian field hockey player from Bengal and member of Indian women's hockey team. She was the first Indian hockey player to get an Arjuna Award in 1961. She was a forward. She was part of the Senior India women's team that visited Australia in 1956 and Sri Lanka in 1960 and 1962. She top scored in the first Sri Lankan tour where India won all the matches.

Born in an Anglo-Indian family, Anne also played tennis and was part of Charnock House at La Martiniere for Girls, Calcutta (now Kolkata).

Prithipal Singh is the other first hockey player from the Indian men's hockey team who got the Award when Arjuna Awards were instituted in 1961. Anne was a compatriot of Elvera Britto.
