= Elvera Britto =

Indian women's field hockey player (1940–2022)

Personal information
- Born: 15 June 1940 Bangalore, Kingdom of Mysore
- Died: 26 April 2022 (aged 81) Bangalore, Karnataka, India

Sport
- Sport: Field hockey
Senior career
Years	Team	Caps	Goals
–	Mysore	-	-
National team
Years	Team	Caps	Goals
–1967	India		-

Elvera Britto (15 June 1940 – 26 April 2022) was an Indian field hockey player who captained the Indian women's hockey team and the Mysore state's team. She captained the Mysore team for eight consecutive national titles between 1960 and 1967. Britto received the Arjuna Award, India's second highest sporting honor, in 1965.

Britto also served as a president of the Karnataka State Women's Hockey Association and a selector for the national women's team.

== Early life ==
Britto was born on 15 June 1940 into an Anglo-Indian family in Cooke Town, a suburb in the Indian city of Bangalore. She was the eldest of four sisters, three of whom would go on to represent the country as a member of the national women's hockey team. In her younger days, Britto participated in multiple sports, including cricket, swimming, and football. She studied at the St. Francis Xavier Girls High School in Bangalore.

== Career ==
Britto started playing hockey when she was 13 and went on to become captain of the Mysore State women's hockey team. As captain between 1960 and 1967, she led the team to win national titles for eight consecutive years. Along with her sisters, Rita and Mae, the Britto sisters were considered a 'formidable trio' in the Indian national and Mysore state teams. She represented India in games against Australia, Japan, and Sri Lanka.

She became the second women's hockey player to receive India's Arjuna Award when she won it in 1965. (Note: Indian newspapers Deccan Herald and The Times of India indicate that Britto won the Arjuna Award in 1966, however, Britto won the award in 1965.) Earlier, Anne Lumsden had won the award in its inaugural year in 1961.

After Britto's retirement from playing in the 1970s, she remained associated with the game as an administrator, serving as the president of the Karnataka State Women's Hockey Association for two terms over eight years. Britto's mother Latetia was one of the founding members of the association. Britto also served as a selector and the manager of the national hockey team, for over twelve years. Referring to the hardships of playing in the 1960s as an Indian women's hockey player, Britto's sister Rae would recollect that the Brittos would travel by third-class trains, cook their own food, and even stitch their own uniforms before a tournament. As an administrator, her focus was said to have been the revival of hockey interest in inter-school competitions arriving at the grounds before even the players, turning up in her moped.

== Personal life ==
Britto died on 26 April 2022 in Bangalore from a heart attack. She was aged 81. She remained unmarried during her lifetime.
