= Claude Martin =

French soldier (1735–1800)

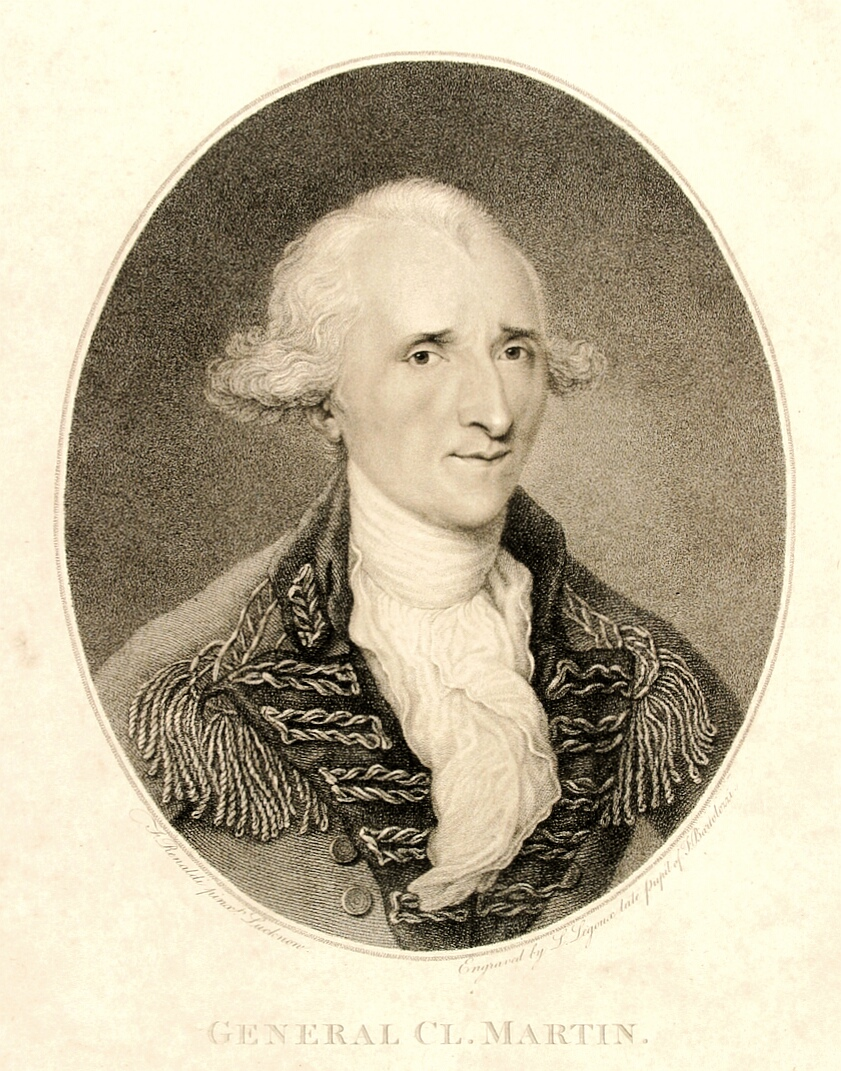
- General Claude Martin's portrait
- Born: 5 January 1735; Lyon, Kingdom of France
- Died: 13 September 1800 (aged 65); Lucknow, Oudh State
- Resting place: Constantia- La Martiniere Lucknow
- Monuments: Farhad Baksh Kothi (Chateau de Lyon), Bibiapur Kothi, Hayat Baksh Kothi and Constantia
- Occupation: Soldier
- Organization: East India Company
- Parents: Fleury Martin (father); Anne Vaginay (mother)

Signature
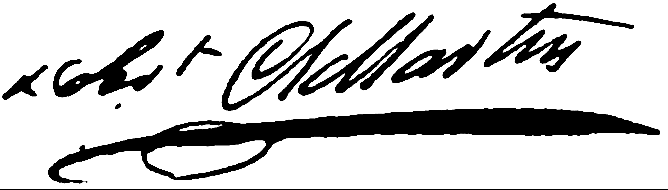

Major-General Claude Martin (5 January 1735 – 13 September 1800) was a French army officer who served in the French and later British East India companies in colonial India. Martin rose to the rank of major-general in the British East India Company's Bengal Army. Martin was born in Lyon, France, into a humble background, and was a self-made man who left a substantial lasting legacy in the form of his writings, buildings and the educational institutions he founded posthumously. There are now ten schools named after him, two in Lucknow, two in Calcutta and six in Lyon. The small village of Martin Purwa in India was also named after him.

== Career ==
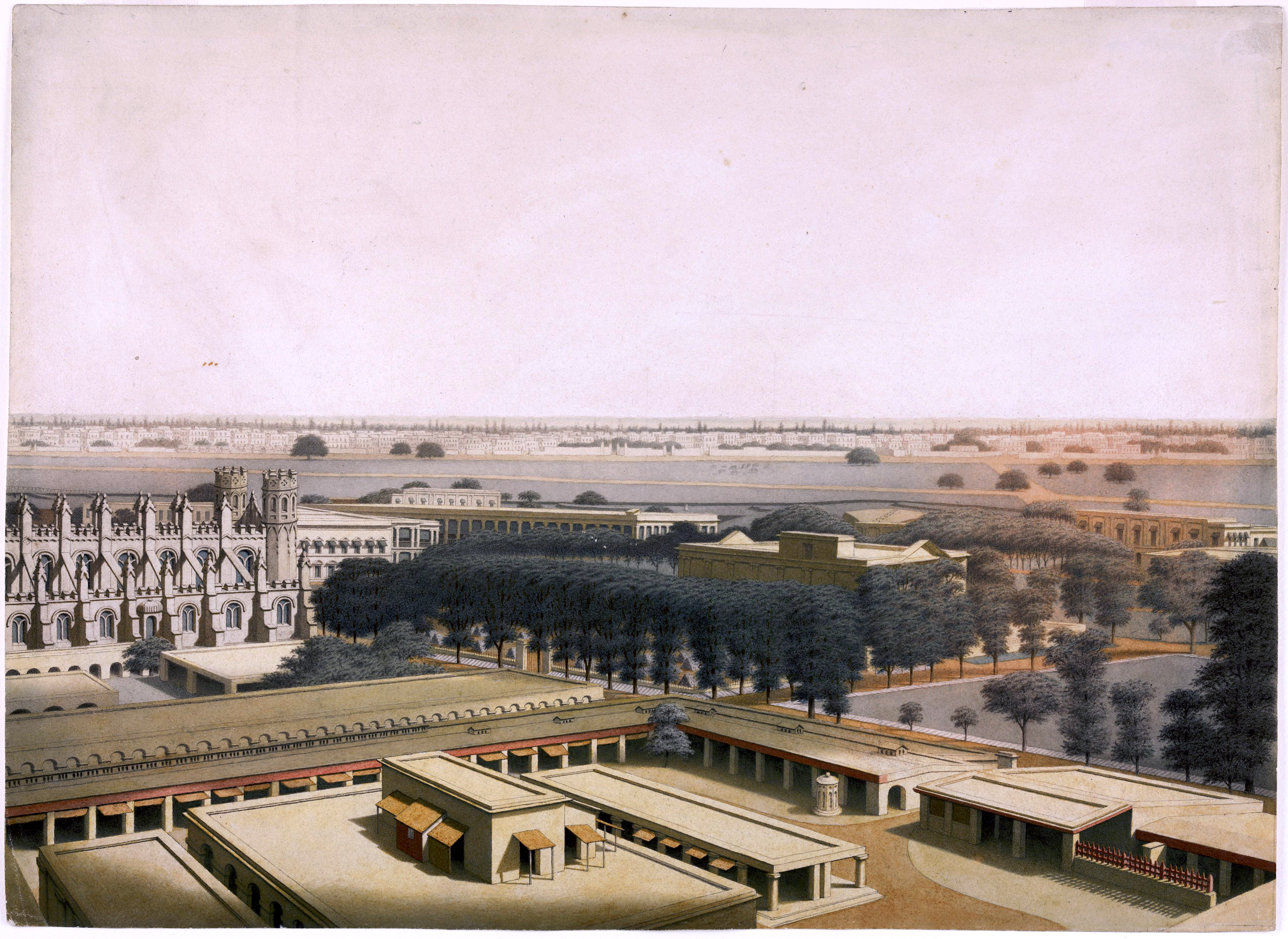
Fort William in Calcutta

Claude Martin was born on 5 January 1735 in the rue de la Palme, Lyon, France. He was the son of Fleury Martin (1708–1755), a casket maker, and Anne Vaginay (1702–1735), a butcher's daughter. At his local parish school he excelled in mathematics and physics. After leaving school he was apprenticed to a local silk weaver. Martin's family were middle class and by this time they had businesses in mustard, vinegar and brandy. His decision to go into the silk yarn business did therefore not go down well with his family.

In 1751 at the age of 16 Martin decided to seek his fortune abroad, and he signed up with the French Compagnie des Indes. His mother is reported to have said that he should not return from enlisting as a soldier until he was "in a carriage". He was posted to India where he served under Commander and Governor Joseph François Dupleix and General Thomas Arthur Lally in the Carnatic Wars against the British East India Company. When the French lost their colony of Pondichéry in 1761, he accepted service in the Bengal Army of the East India Company in 1763, ultimately rising to the rank of Major General.

He was initially employed at the then-new Fort William in Calcutta, Bengal, and afterwards on the survey of Bengal under the English Surveyor General James Rennell. In 1776, Martin was allowed to accept the appointment of Superintendent of the Arsenal for the Nawab of Awadh, Asaf-ud-Daula, at Lucknow, retaining his rank but being ultimately placed on half pay. He resided in Lucknow from 1776 until his death. It was the 'Reign of Terror' during the French Revolution that prevented him from returning "in a carriage". His friend, Antoine Polier, gave up his wives and children as he left India to return to France. Polier was stabbed to death in a criminal assault during the aforesaid revolution. Martin never formally gave up his nationality as a Frenchma, but definitely intended to, towards the end of his life, as he sought promotions in the Bengal Army.

=== As soldier ===
Martin began his career as a dragoon and remained essentially a soldier throughout his life, a fighter and a strategist which explains his success in life in spite of difficult circumstances.

Beginning with the French East India Company, he was quick to realise the changing power dynamics and chose to build his army career with the British East India Company. He was recognized for his military talents and got important experience in various military encounters. His administrative acumen was also well known and it was his reputation that made Shuja-ud-daulah the Nawab of Awadh, request his services at Lucknow.

His service at the court of Nawab Asaf-ud-Daulah together with supplementary aids to the company during the attack on Tipu at Seringpatnam shows that his strategic skills remained intact even in his later years. He was promoted to the ranks of Colonel (in 1793) and Major General (in 1795) being an extraordinary case, since no alien soldier in the Company Army was allowed to rise above the rank of Major.

=== As architect and builder ===
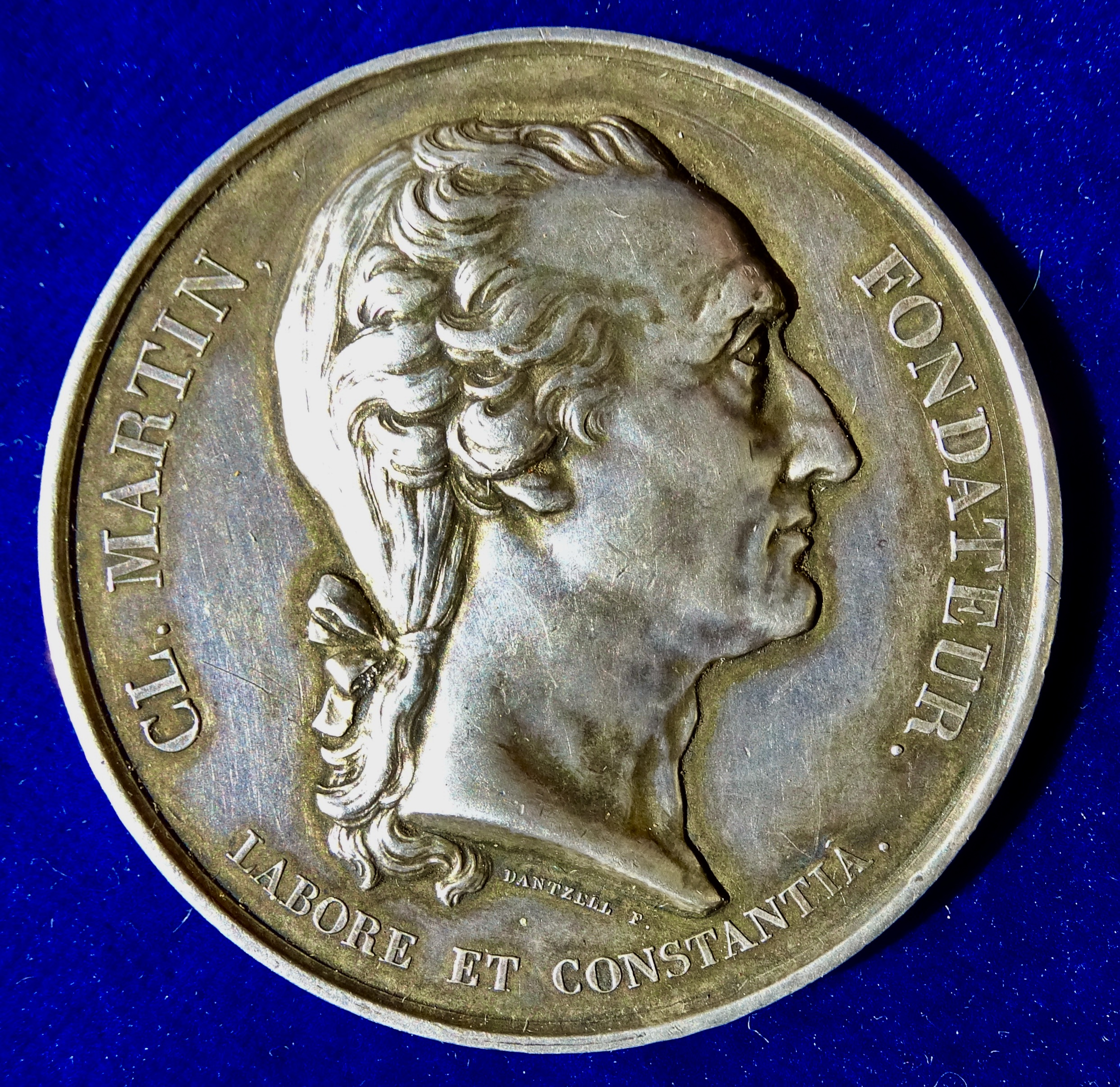
Claude Martin on the obverse of a 1874 award medal of La Martinière Lyon

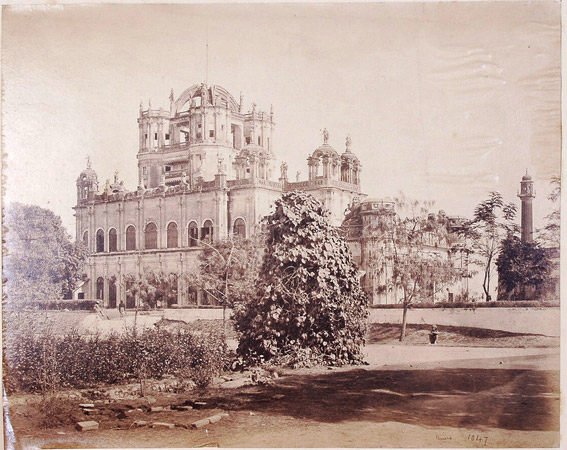
Constantia before the "mutiny"

Coming from Lyon, Martin must have acquired an eye for imposing architecture from his childhood days in his beautiful hometown.

His architectural skills were much in demand at Lucknow and his nearness to Nawab Asaf-ud-daula gave him a unique opportunity to participate in the making of modern Lucknow. Martin moved to Lucknow almost at the same time when Asaf-ud-daula shifted the Capital to Lucknow. Asaf-ud-daulah and Claude Martin became chief architects of the city of Lucknow. Raj Bhavan (Hindi for 'Government House') is the official residence of the governor of Uttar Pradesh. Raj Bhavan used to be called Kothi Hayat Baksh. Major General Claude Martin drew the layout of the building in 1798 after Nawab Asaf-ud-daula, the East India Company made Sadaat Ali Khan its new ruler. The new ruler liked the buildings designed by Claude Martin. The contract for the construction of Kothi was undertaken by Martin as requested by Saadat Ali Khan.

Some of the buildings of Lucknow which have Martin's distinctive touch are: Farhad Baksh, Asafi Kothi, Bibiapur, Barowen and of course the Constantia.

Most of Martin's buildings were unique and were copied extensively by other designers keeping in mind their defence against military attack.

=== As collector and connoisseur ===
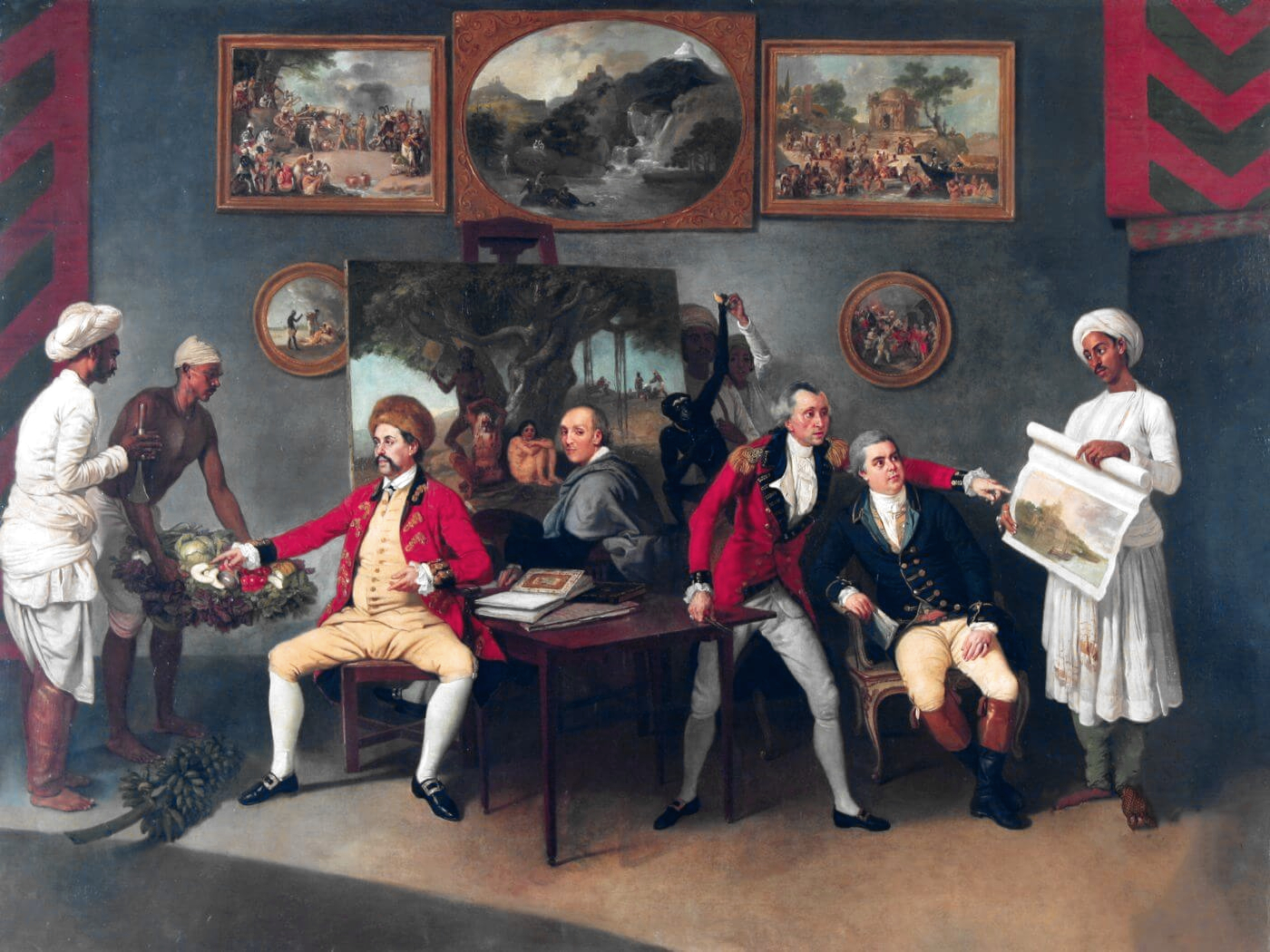
Antoine Polier, Martin, Johan Zoffany and John Wombwell surrounded by Indian servants and Polier's art collection

While serving under the Nawab Asaf-Ud-Dowlah of Awadh, Martin acquired a massive fortune of about Rs 4,000,000. He built the palace of Constantia and his fine house of Farhat Baksh, both of which he equipped with luxuries that included a library of some 4,000 volumes written in many languages and a picture gallery containing a fine collection of works of art. At his death, Claude's collection included over 650 Company style paintings of birds which were painted by Mughal-trained painters. Black Stork in a Landscape, now in the Metropolitan Museum of Art in New York, is one of these.

Martin's love of art can be seen not only in his acquisition of art, but also in the design of his houses, his friendship with noted artists like Renaldi, Hodges and Zoffany (who included him in at least two paintings). In a number of cases he used local artists to create work in the style of European artists. His walls were decorated with neo-Greek Wedgwood style decorations, his paintings were by Mughal-trained artists and the statues above his palace were mostly clever reproductions in the style of two European statues.

Later, Martin's life was mired in controversy as he had kept two wives of Colonel Polier's, after Polier had departed from India. It is obvious however that he cared for his favourite mistress Boulone, and she is the subject of a painting by Zoffany in 1795 which is still at La Martiniere Boys' School in Lucknow today.

Renaldi is possibly the sculptor for a copper and silver medal (30 mm in diameter) issued by Nawab Asaf-uddula, which bears Martin's image and his motto. On the reverse side it says in Persian:

"Most excellent in government, Sword of the Realm, Supreme amongst Knights, General Claude Martin the Brave, Courageous in War. 1796- 1797."

All the furnishings and treasures of Constantia, as well as those from Martin's first Lucknow house, the Farhat Baksh, were auctioned on his death, as he had requested. The great chandeliers were bought for the Government House (now Raj Bhavan) in Calcutta, where they still hang, but the majority of his collection was dispersed to private buyers.

=== As Nawab ===
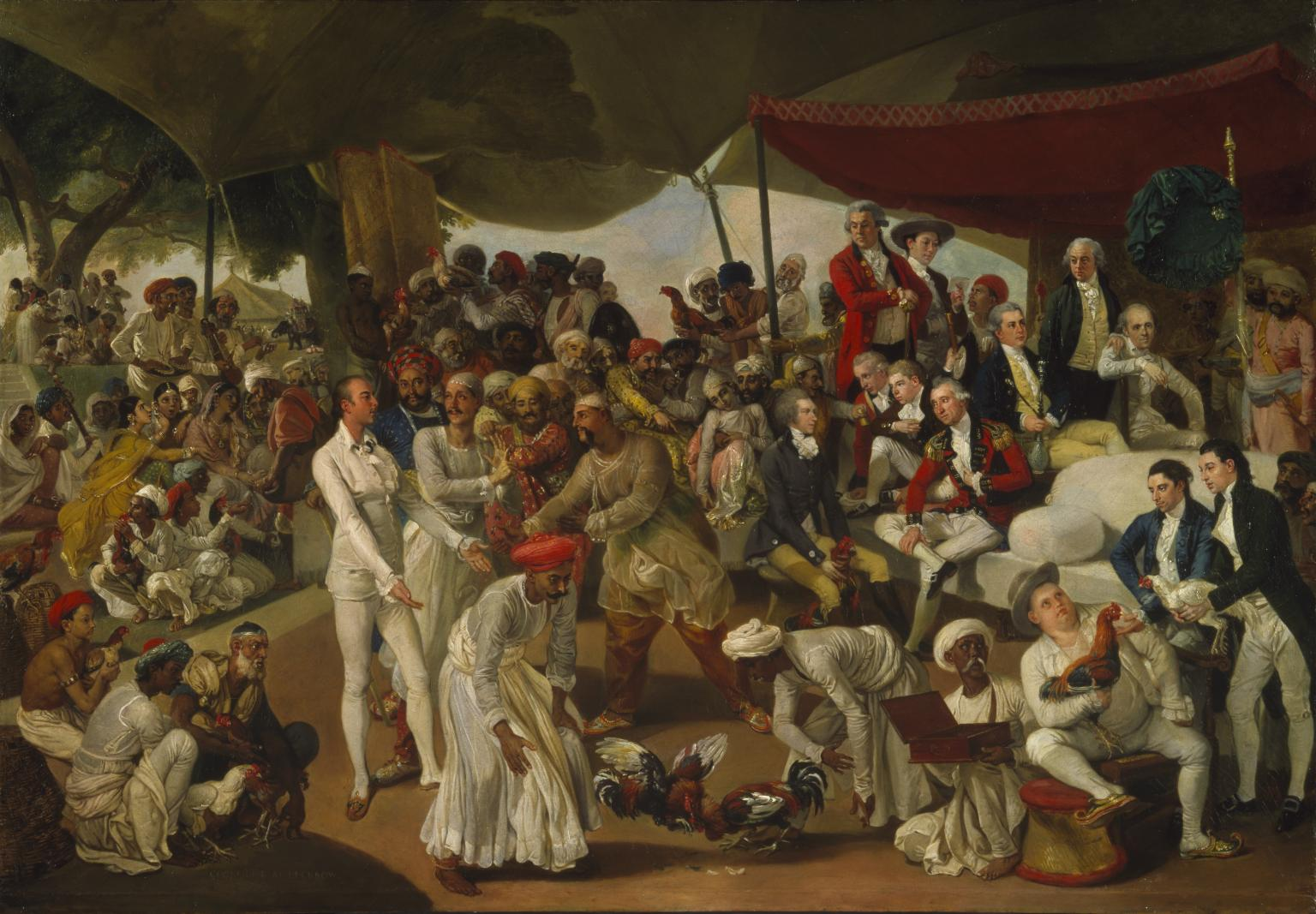
Colonel Mordaunt's Cock Match (Johan Zoffany, c. 1785). Claude is to the right in a shorter red jacket.

During Martin's stay in Lucknow, he acquired significant wealth as part of the ruling coterie; he was in charge of the state arsenal, designed and constructed many buildings, and acquired vast tracts of land.

This favourable set of circumstances catapulted Martin into the upper crust of Lucknow and he had to conform to the social mores of a contemporary society. Given his unconventional views (as revealed in his Will) this transition must have been not too difficult. He most probably enjoyed his role as a nawab.

He gave regular parties for the British as well as the nawabi aristocracy and participated with gusto in the social and cultural activities of Lucknow.

He had a city residence (the Farhat Baksh) and a country palace, the Constantia. He had other properties in Lucknow, Kanpur, Bhazipur and Benaras as well, from which he derived a substantial income.

Keeping his last will and testament in view he was a kind master, concerned about the welfare of his staff and servants.

=== As banker and businessman ===
Claude Martin was an astute businessman with a diversity of interests. He was well known for his financial skills, and it was said that he never ran after money, but made it come to him. Part of his immense fortune came from the bank he started at Lucknow. He loaned money to the Nawab of Awadh, the largest loan being for the sum of £250,000 in 1794, which he apparently retrieved with difficulty.

Martin was quick to realize the importance of indigo farming and invested in this profitable enterprise in several parts of North India. He exported indigo and cloth to Europe in exchange for Spanish dollars. Martin also started a cannon foundry, introduced a Dutch method of cutting diamonds, made gunpowder, and coined rupees.

=== As self-surgeon ===
Apart from being a self-made man, Martin was an amateur scientist and a doctor of sorts. He seems to have suffered from bladder stones in his urinary tract and in 1782, despite excruciating suffering, he successfully attempted a primitive and unorthodox form of lithotripsy (breaking the stones via a waxed-wire insertion up the urethra). Martin sent details of the operation to the Company of Surgeons in London and, notwithstanding initial scepticism among bladder surgeons, it appears to have been accepted as the first recorded operation of its kind.

=== As hot air balloonist ===
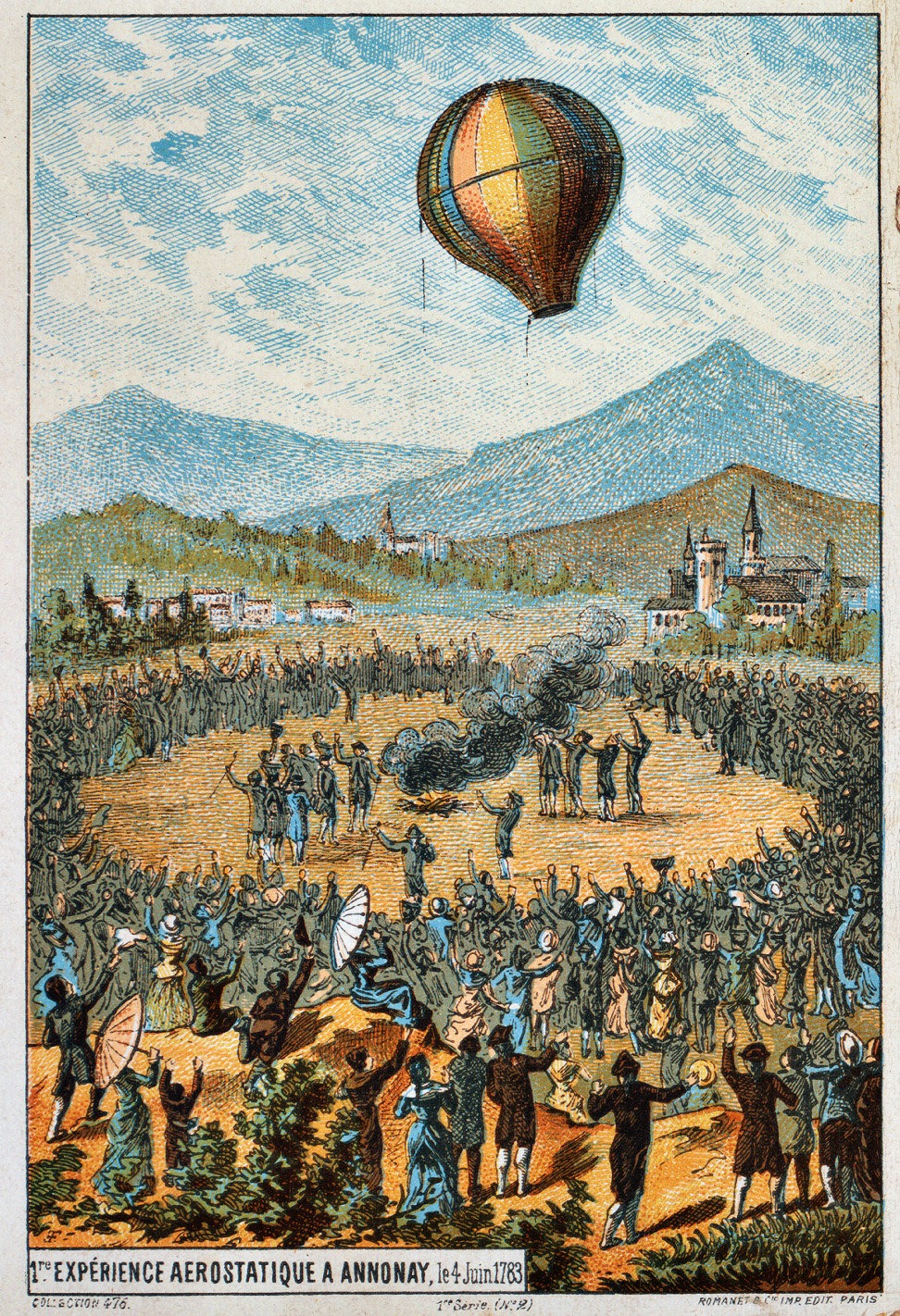
First public demonstration in Annonay, France, in 1783

Claude Martin's wide interests included hot air balloons, and he was instrumental in introducing a Montgolfier to the Nawab and aristocracy of Lucknow in 1785, less than two years after its flight in France.

Allan Sealy in his historic novel Trotter-nama features this aspect of Claude Martin.

=== As philanthropist ===
Martin was a charitable person and philanthropist by heart as is reflected in the following excerpt from his last will and testament:

"I give and bequeath the sum of one hundred and fifty thousand rupees for to be placed at Interest in the most secure manner possible in the East India Company or Government papers bearing interest and that interest to be employed for the poor first having divided this Interest in three portions or parts one – for the relief of the poor of Lucknow of any religion – for the poor of Calcutta – for the relief of the Poor of Chandernaggur".

=== As educationist ===
Of all the European adventurers in India, Claude Martin is singular in that he left the greater part of his wealth to a variety of charities. Being almost entirely self-educated, he realised the value of formalised education and willed a major part of his fortune to the creation of three institutions of learning in Calcutta, Lucknow and in his birth town of Lyon in France which are all named La Martiniere College. All three schools all celebrate Founder's Day on 13 September, the anniversary of Martin's death.

Claude Martin's ideas on education are reflected in the following extract from his writings:

"I have read a lot, pen in hand, often under difficult conditions, and I know the value of the first rudiments inculcated by the parson of St. Saturnin. That is why I divide my fortune in two. I want to thank all those who have been around me by making their life easier after my death. I also want to give the children of both Lyon and India, the instruction which I received with so much difficulty. I want to make it easy for young people to get access to knowledge, specially the sciences."

Though his will had not mentioned any ethnic or religious restrictions on those who would be allowed to apply to the institutions of learning, the La Martinier College in Calcutta (after thirty years of litigation) only permitted European and Armenian Christians to apply. Coming about due to changing attitudes towards race among the Company administration in India, the school only permitted Indian students (of any religious denomination) to apply in 1935.

== Personal life ==
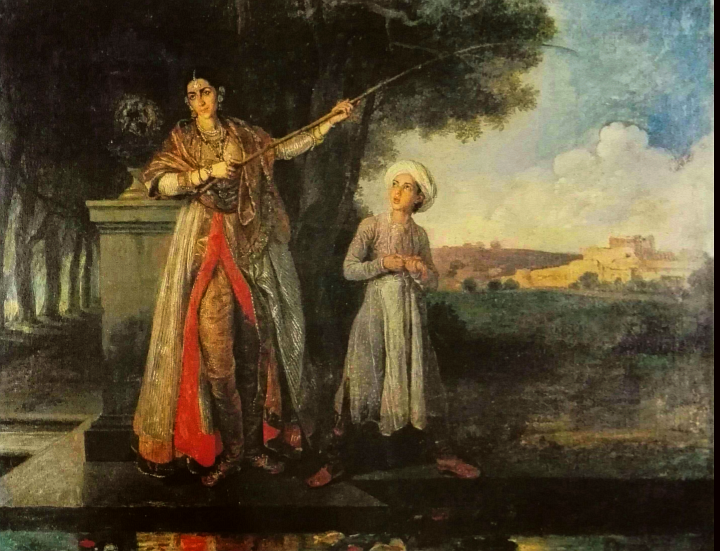
A painting by Johan Zoffany showing Martin's mistress Boulone Lise and adopted child James Martin

Martin never married but, as a nawab, he had close and long relationships with several mistresses, which was the normal practice in that era. His favourite mistress was a girl called Boulone (c.1766–1844), who was some thirty years younger than Martin. He had bought her as a young girl aged nine. Martin always claimed that they lived happily together, but Boulone must inevitably have harboured feelings of jealousy when Martin introduced younger mistresses into the household. Boulone is commemorated in a small gilt-framed painting in the Blue Room of La Martinière. She is pictured next to a young boy named James Zulphikar, who was said to have been adopted by Martin. Both figures are dressed in 18th-century Indian costume, and Boulone is holding a fishing rod. Boulone is buried in a purpose-built Muslim tomb in the grounds of the college. It is here that a few rupees are given out once a month to the poor people of Lucknow, in accordance with the instructions in Martin's will.

== Martin on himself ==
Chandan Mitra in his book Constant Glory has this self-introspective analysis from Martin:

"I have always refused to give up the French nationality, but of which France do I belong? That of Louis XV, where I have only known misery before embarking on the L'Orient ? That of philosophers, of terror bathing in blood, or that of Bonaparte whose eastern dream has just been dissipated, after leaving Tipu Sahib alone against the English? I have collaborated for his defeat and then after he lost I have been rewarded by some gold sprinkling on my uniform-a vain plaything for my vanity. By my perseverance and hard work I have accumulated a fortune from this country which is my second motherland. I have not cheated the people who have passively succumbed to the yoke of corrupt men."

== Epitaph ==
Claude Martin died on 13 September 1800 at the Town House, Lucknow. According to his last wishes, he was buried in the vault specially prepared for his remains in the basement of Constantia in Lucknow. The inscription on his tombstone reads:

Major-General Claude Martin.

Arrived in India as a common soldier
and died at Lucknow on 13 September,
1800, as a Major-General.
He is buried in this tomb.
Pray for his soul."

== See also ==
- The will of Claude Martin
- La Martiniere College
- La Martiniere Calcutta
- La Martiniere Lucknow
- La Martiniere Lyon
- Martinians
- Martin Purwa
- Claude Martin Wade – A Colonel named after Claude Martin
