= La Martinière College =

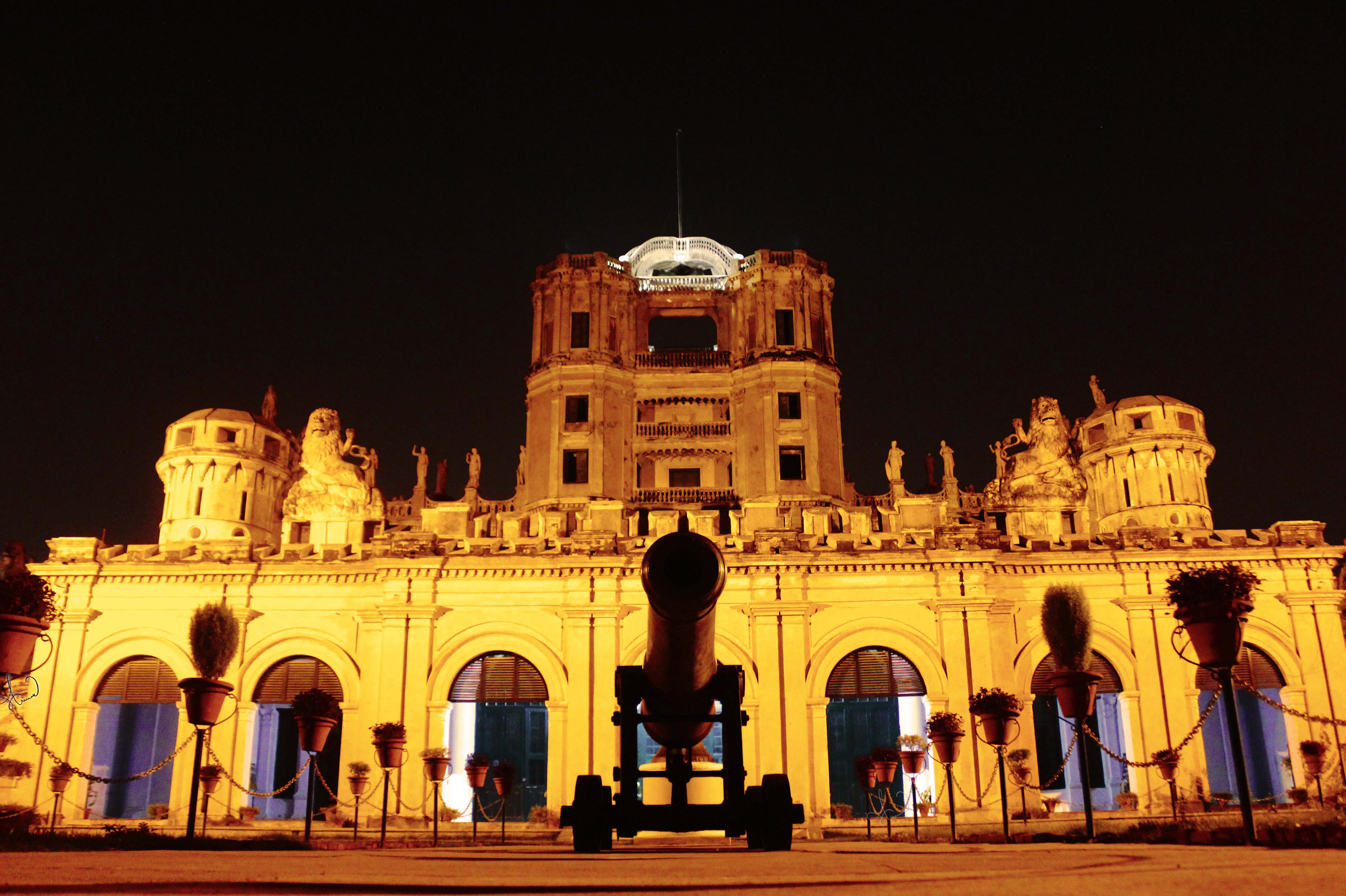
- India, France

Information
- Type: Private
- Motto: Labore-Et-Constantia (By Labour and Constancy)
- Established: 1 October 1845 by Claude Martin
- Campus: Urban city, varying area
- Colours: Black and Amber for Kolkata, Blue and Gold for Lucknow
- Number of branches: 7 (3 schools in Lyon, 2 in Calcutta and 2 in Lucknow)
- Website: www.lamartinierelucknow.org

La Martinière College is a consortium of bi-national elite private schools, majority of them located in India. They are officially non-denominational private schools with units of two branches each in Indian cities of Kolkata and Lucknow; and in France, the consortium is represented by a number of three branches in Lyon.

La Martinière Schools were founded posthumously by Major General Claude Martin, in the early 19th century. Martin had acquired a large fortune while serving the Nawab of Awadh Asaf-ud-Daula and bequeathed a major part of his estate to establish the schools. His will outlined every detail of the schools, from their location to the manner of celebrating the annual Founder's Day. The seven branches function independently, but maintain close contacts and share most traditions.

La Martinière College, Lucknow was awarded a Battle Honour – 'Defense of Lucknow' for the part the staff and pupils played in the Defence of the Residency at Lucknow during the Sepoy Mutiny of 1857 – the only school in the world so distinguished.

La Martinière Calcutta and La Martinière Lucknow consist of separate girls' and boys' schools, while the three in La Martinière Lyon are co-educational. The Colleges are day schools, but Indian units have boarding facilities as well. Extra-curricular activities, including sports and community service organizations, are emphasized, and music and dance are included in the general curriculum.

== Major-General Claude Martin, the founder ==
Claude Martin (1735–1800)

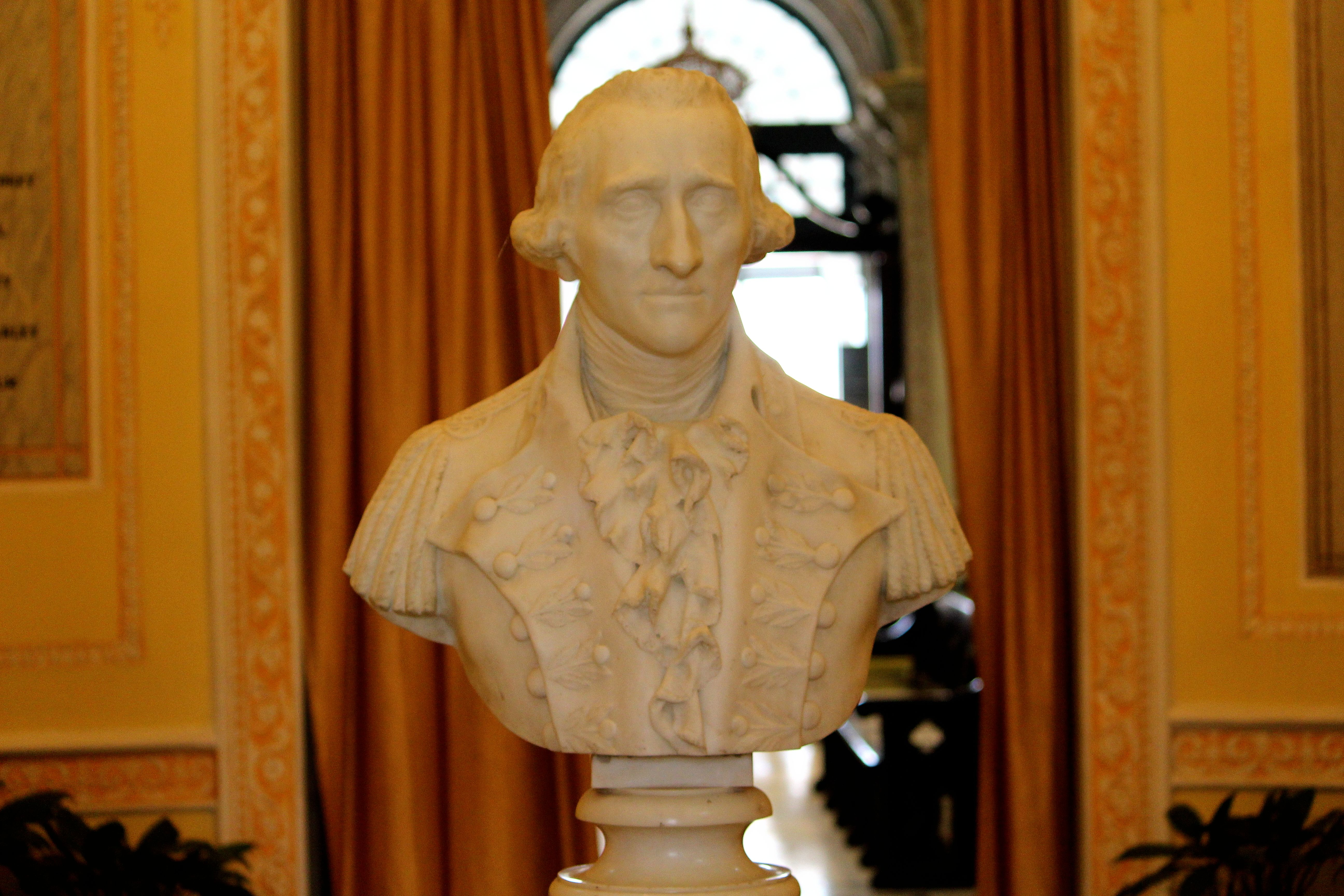
Claude Martin's bust inside the School

Claude Martin was born on 5 January 1735 in Lyon, France. He came to India when he was seventeen. After the French influence declined in India, he served in the British East India Company and rose to the rank of Major-General. After taking up residence in Lucknow, he occupied an important position in the court of Nawab Shuja-ud-Daulah and later his son, Asaf-ud-Daula.

During this period Martin accumulated a fortune of about 4,000,000 rupees. He built the palace of 'Constantia' and his fine house of Farud Baksh, both of which he equipped with luxuries that included a library of some 4,000 volumes written in many languages and a picture gallery containing a collection of works of art.

Martin died in Lucknow on 13 September 1800. According to his will, he was buried in the vault prepared for his remains in the basement of the college in Lucknow.

The major portion of his estate was left for the founding of three institutions, one each at Lucknow, Calcutta and his birthplace Lyon in France. It took 30 years to dispose of the litigation arising out of Claude Martin's will. Finally, as the result of a Supreme Court decision, La Martinière Schools opened in Calcutta, on 1 March 1836.

Though his will had not mentioned any ethnic or religious restrictions on those who would be allowed to apply to the institutions of learning, the La Martiniere College in Calcutta (after thirty years of litigation) only permitted European and Armenian Christians to apply. Coming about due to changing attitudes towards race among the Company administration in India, the school only permitted Indian students (of any religious denomination) to apply in 1935.

== La Martinière coat of arms ==
The La Martinière coat of arms was designed by the founder Claude Martin. It is supported by seven flags, each bearing the design of a fish, the emblem of Oudh. The devices on the escutcheon appear to epitomise Claude Martin's life. The ship recalls his voyage to India where he established his fortune. The flag with the pennant represents his career as an officer in the East India Company and with the Nawab of Oudh The setting sun behind the castellated building to the right of the fish has been said to point to the sunset of his days and the large part which the building of "Constantia" played in his later years. The coat of arms and the accompanying motto "Labore et Constantia" are now shared by all the schools founded by Martin.

The La Martinere College flag consists of the coat of arms on a blue and gold background. The flag is generally flown above the buildings, and used for formal events and celebrations, such as the annual Founder's Day.

The seal is engraved on the school buildings.

== College traditions ==
=== Founder's Day ===
Founder's Day is commemorated every year on 13 September, the day Claude Martin died. Some of the traditions of this day include an extended formal assembly in the morning with a faculty march, a speech by a prominent guest or alumnus, the playing of bagpipes, singing of the school song and other selected hymns by the College choir, and the laying of a wreath at Claude Martin's tomb.

For the Founder's Day dinner the entire senior school and staff are treated to an elaborate sit-down dinner in the afternoon. Claude Martin had apparently listed in his will that his death should not be commemorated as a day of mourning but one of celebration of his life. He had also written out a menu for the meal to be served. Although today, the menu does not remain the same, the tradition of the Founder's Day dinner is still preserved.

A Founder's Day Social is held in the evening for the senior school. Classes are suspended on Founder's Day, which is generally followed by a school holiday.

=== Prize Day ===
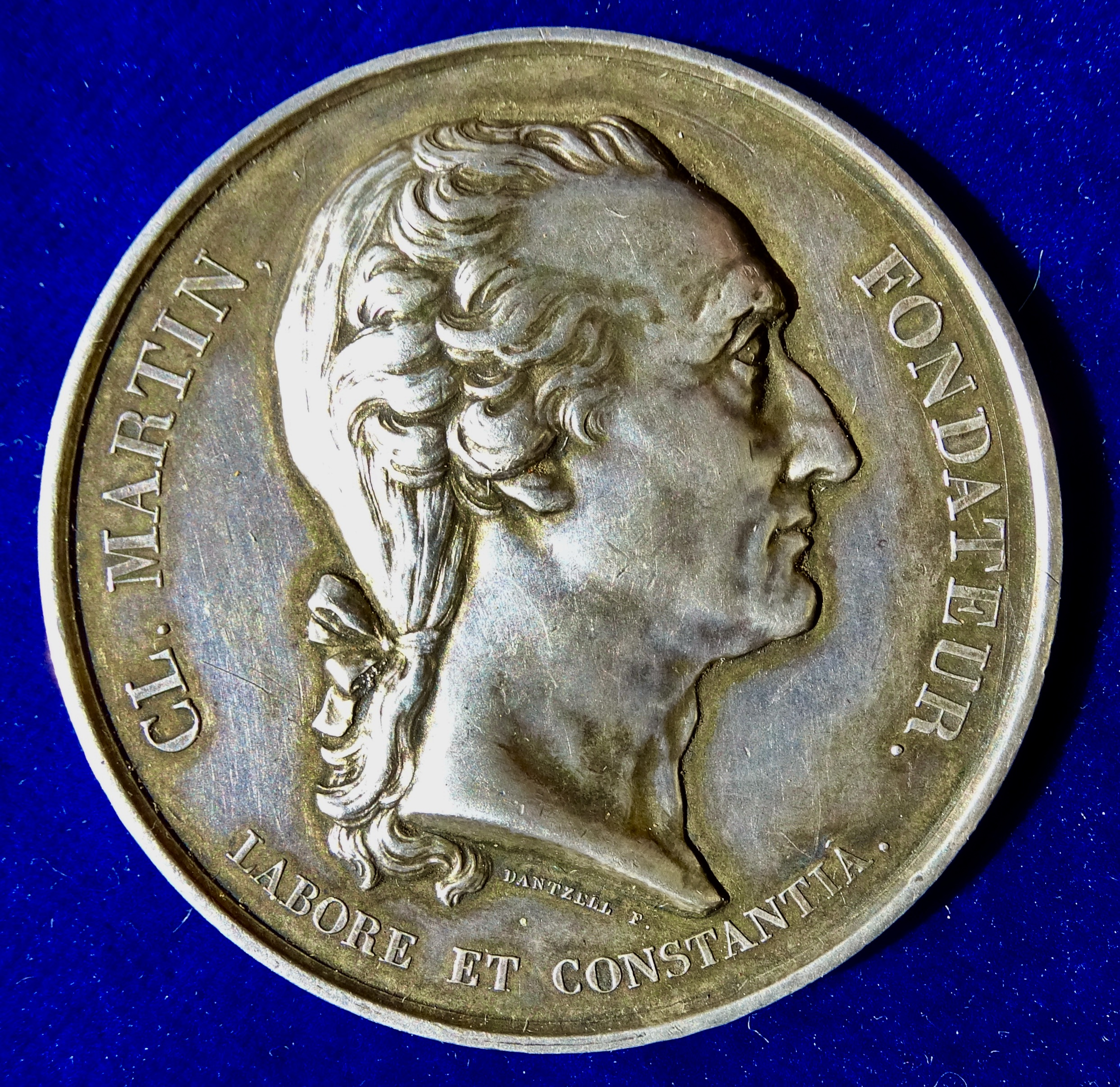
The founder Claude Martin on the obverse of a 1874 prize medal of La Martinière Lyon

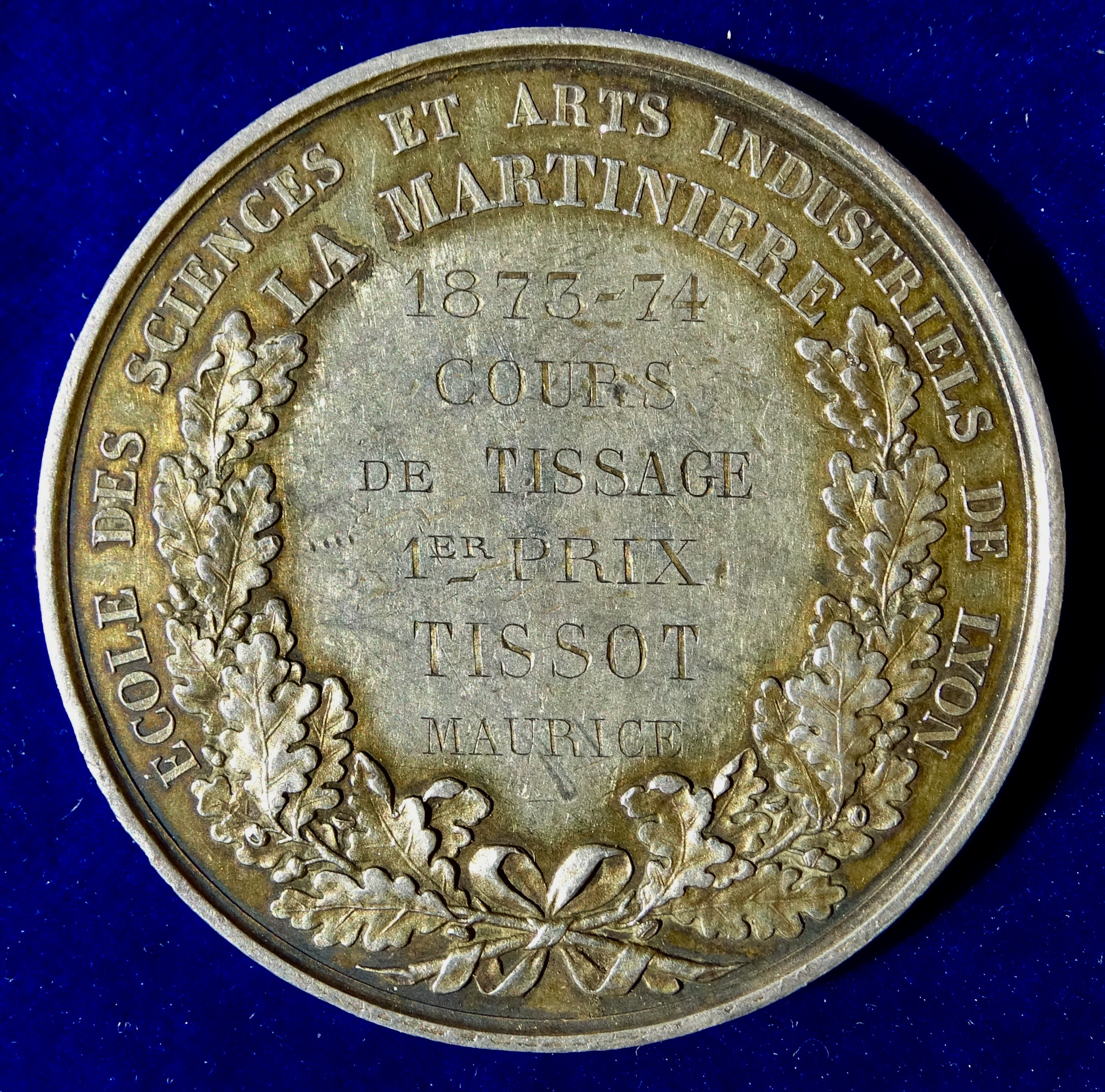
The reverse of that medal by Joseph Dantzell (1805 Lyon - 1877 Paris) engraved with the winner of a 1st Prize Maurice Tissot

At the end of each academic year, usually in April, Prize Day is held to recognize academic excellence and to honour high achieving students. Some of the traditions include a formal assembly in the afternoon involving a faculty march, a formal speech by a prominent guest or alumnus, singing of the school song and other selected works by the College choir. Generally the top three ranking students of each class are awarded prizes, usually books, and upper classes receive subject proficiency awards.

In India, the students achieving first rank in competing academic examinations in grades 10 and 12 are awarded the Founder's Gold Medal. Several additional special prizes are also awarded.

=== Sports Day ===
Each year, on the last Sunday of November, the athletic talents of the students are displayed. Traditions include a school march (which involves a military-type march around the school grounds), gymnastics, a performance by the school band, and an athletic competition between the school houses. The athletic competition includes several events such as shot put, track and field events and long jump.

=== The School Socials ===
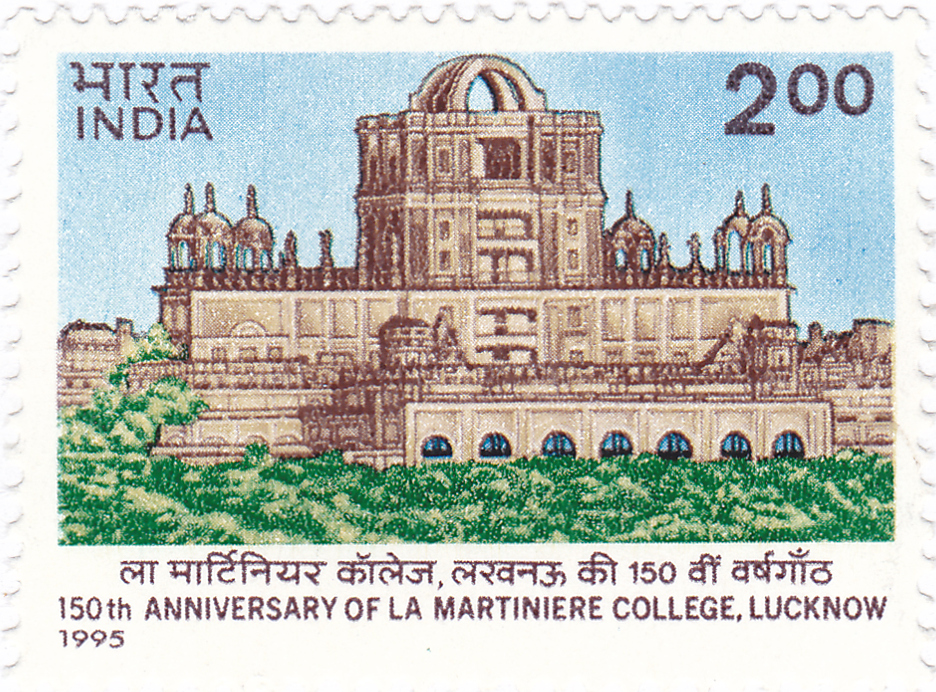
150 Anniversary of La Martiniere College, Lucknow postage stamp of India

The Socials at La Martinière are elegant events in the English tradition. Students from both the girls and boys sections are invited to the socials. Ceremonial uniform is worn by boys, while formal dresses are worn by girls. "The Social" is a tradition of La Martinière and a memory of its English past.

The Socials are held in the College Hall and the girls are invited to the boys school. Socials are also held after the yearly 'Inter-Martiniere Meet' is held between the two schools at Lucknow and Kolkata.

La Martinière has always been regarded as one of the finest schools in India. Given its foundation in English tradition, it has been compared to the Public Schools of England, and has been referred to as "The Eton of the East" by William Dalrymple, in his book "The Age of Kali."

=== Hostel ===
La Matinière Calcutta and Lucknow both have hostel facilities. Dormitories are provided with swimming and other facilities. Every December the boarders have a special night named "Boarders Night" where all the boarders and teachers come together for a dance party. The next night is followed by Boarders Night Socials where both boys and girl school boarders have socials.

== Notable alumni ==
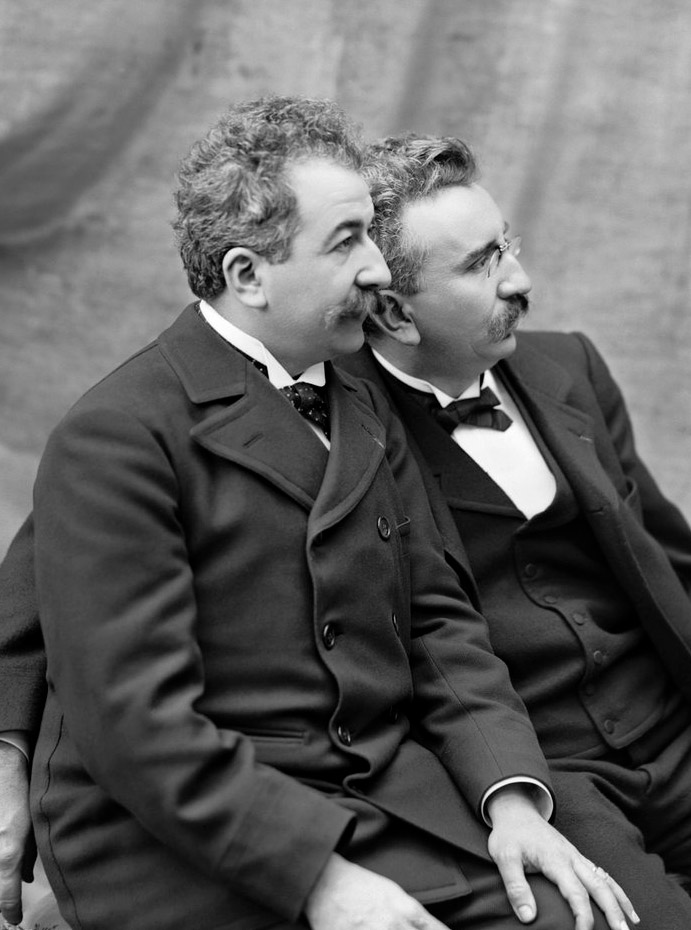
Auguste (left) and Louis Lumière.

- The Lumiere Brothers, early filmmakers, studied at the La Martinière, Lyon.
- The actress Merle Oberon studied at La Martinière, Calcutta.
- Both the Lucknow and Calcutta Girls' Schools have produced a "Miss India" each: Priyanka Chopra, from La Martinière Lucknow and Nafisa Ali, from Calcutta.
- La Martinière Calcutta has produced a father and son duo Vece Paes, hockey player, and Leander Paes, tennis player, both of whom won medals at the Olympics.
- Rajendra K. Pachauri, academic, studied at La Martinière, Lucknow.
- Vijay Mallya, businessman and politician, studied at La Martinière, Calcutta
- Muzaffar Ali, Bollywood film producer.
- Vinod Mehta, journalist, editor and political commentator, La Martinière, Lucknow.
- Ali Fazal, actor, studied at La Martinière, Lucknow.

== See also ==
- Siege of Lucknow
- The will of Claude Martin
- Vive La Martiniere, the school song by Frederick James Rowe
