= La Martinière College, Lucknow =

Coordinates: 26°50′22.42″N 80°57′47.59″E

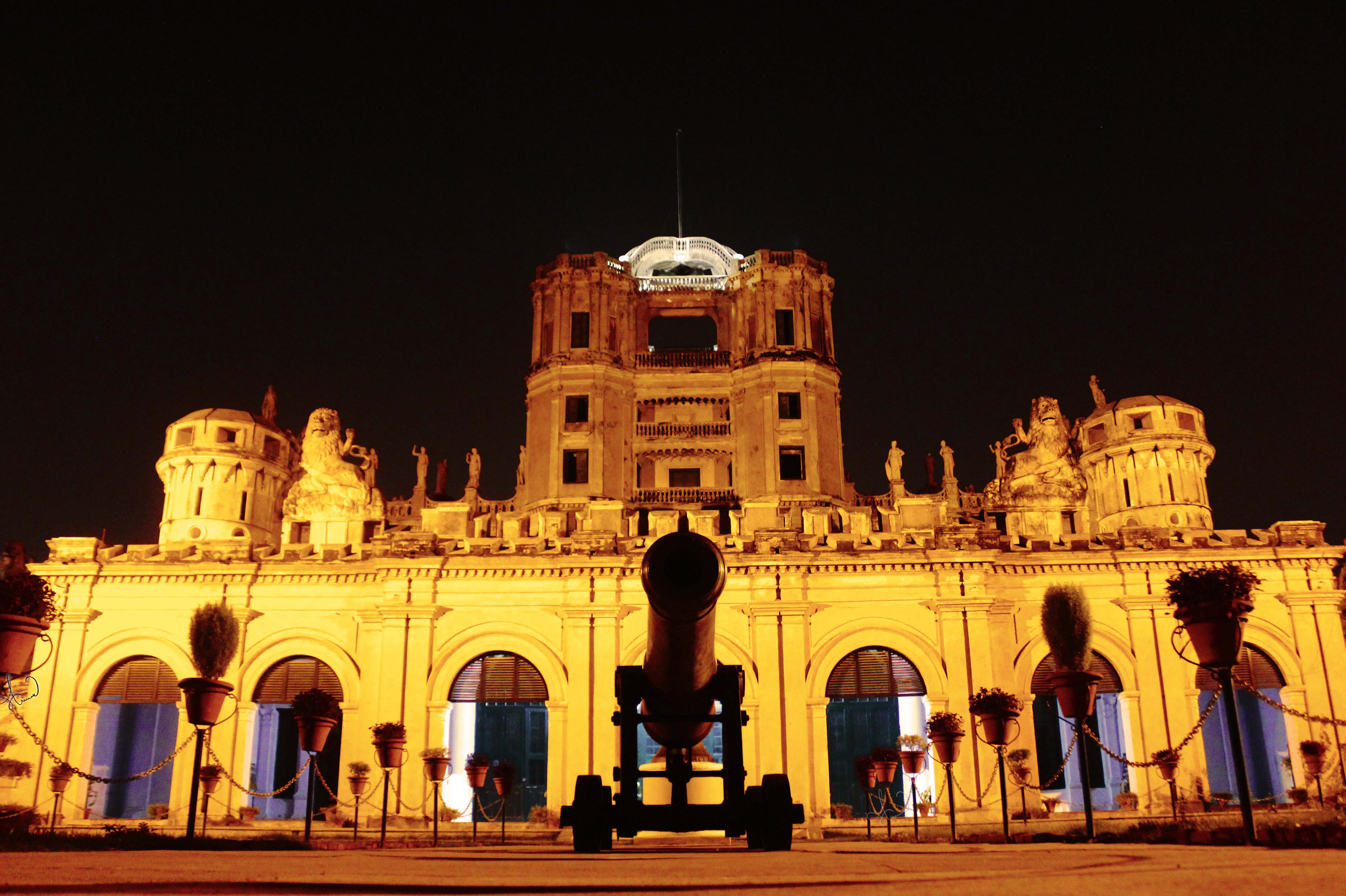
- Lucknow, India

Information
- Type: Trustee
- Motto: labore et constantia ("By Labour and Constancy")
- Established: 1845; 181 years ago (boys); 1869 (girls)
- Founder: Major General Claude Martin
- Principal: Gary Dominic Everet (boys); Aashrita Dass (girls)
- Staff: Varies
- Enrollment: c. 4000 boys + c. 2,200 girls
- Campus: Urban city, varying area
- Houses: 4
- Colours: Blue and Gold
- Publication: Constantia (annually) The Martiniere Post (monthly)
- Former pupils: Old Martinians
- Website: www.lamartinierelucknow.org www.lamartinieregirlscollegelko.com

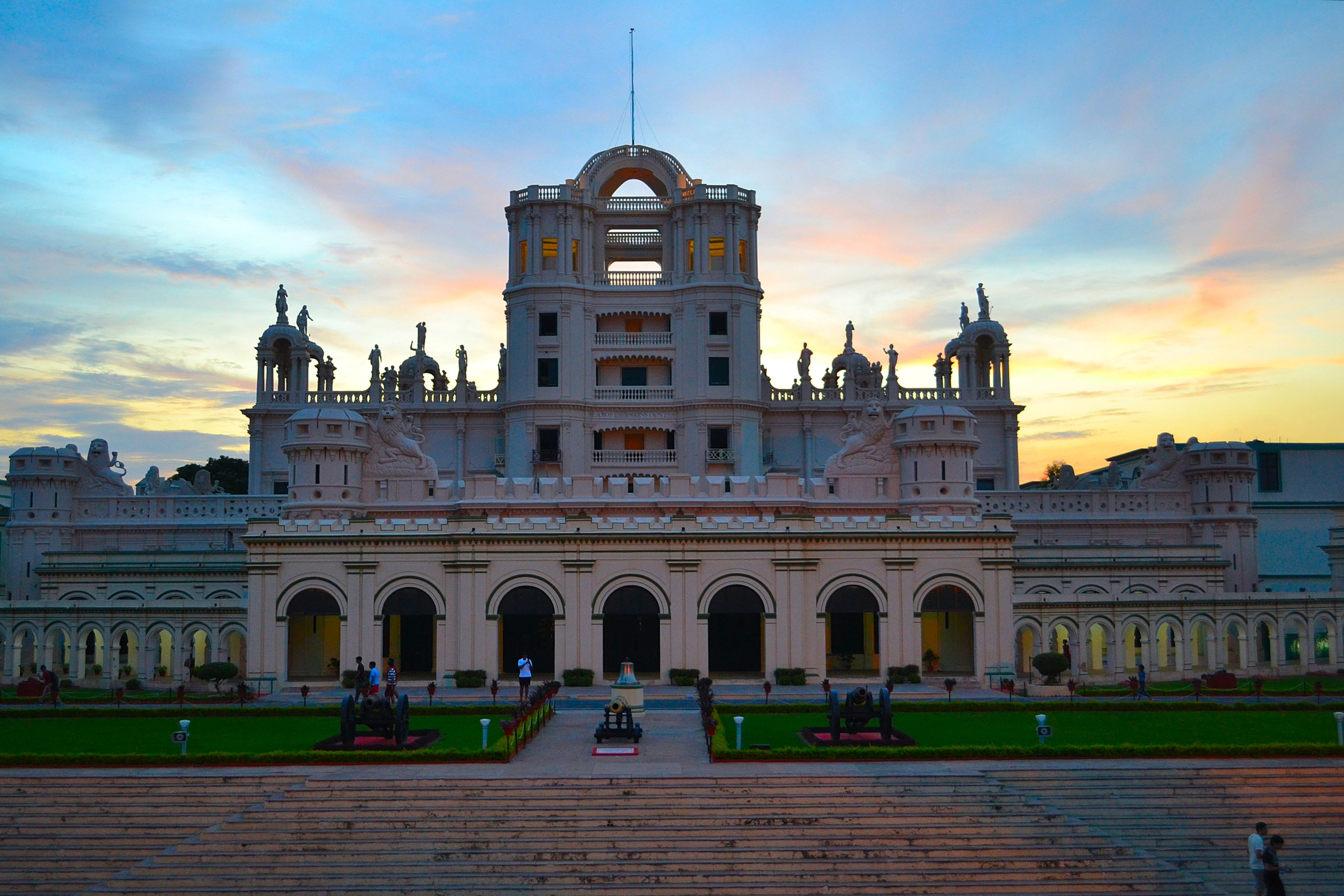
La Martiniere, Lucknow

La Martinière College is an elite educational institution located in Lucknow, the capital of the Indian state of Uttar Pradesh. The college consists of two schools on different campuses for boys and girls. La Martinière College (for boys) was founded in 1845 and La Martinière Girls' College was established in 1869. La Martiniere Boys' College is the only school in the world to have been awarded royal battle honours for its role in the defence of Lucknow and the Lucknow residency during the Indian Rebellion of 1857.

The two Lucknow colleges are part of the La Martinière family of schools, founded by the French adventurer Major General Claude Martin. There are two La Martiniere Colleges in Kolkata and three in Lyon. La Martiniere provides a liberal education and the medium of instruction is the English language. The schools cater for pupils from the age of 5 to 17 or 18, and are open to children of all religious denominations, the boys' school has a Chapel, a Hindu Temple and a Mosque on its campus and has remained a non-denominational school since its inception, unlike the two La Martiniere Schools in Calcutta which are Christian schools, controlled by the Anglican Church of North India. Both the schools have day scholars and residence scholars (boarders).

The Economist has described its Constantia building as "perhaps the best-preserved colonial building in Lucknow".

== Major-General Claude Martin ==
Claude Martin

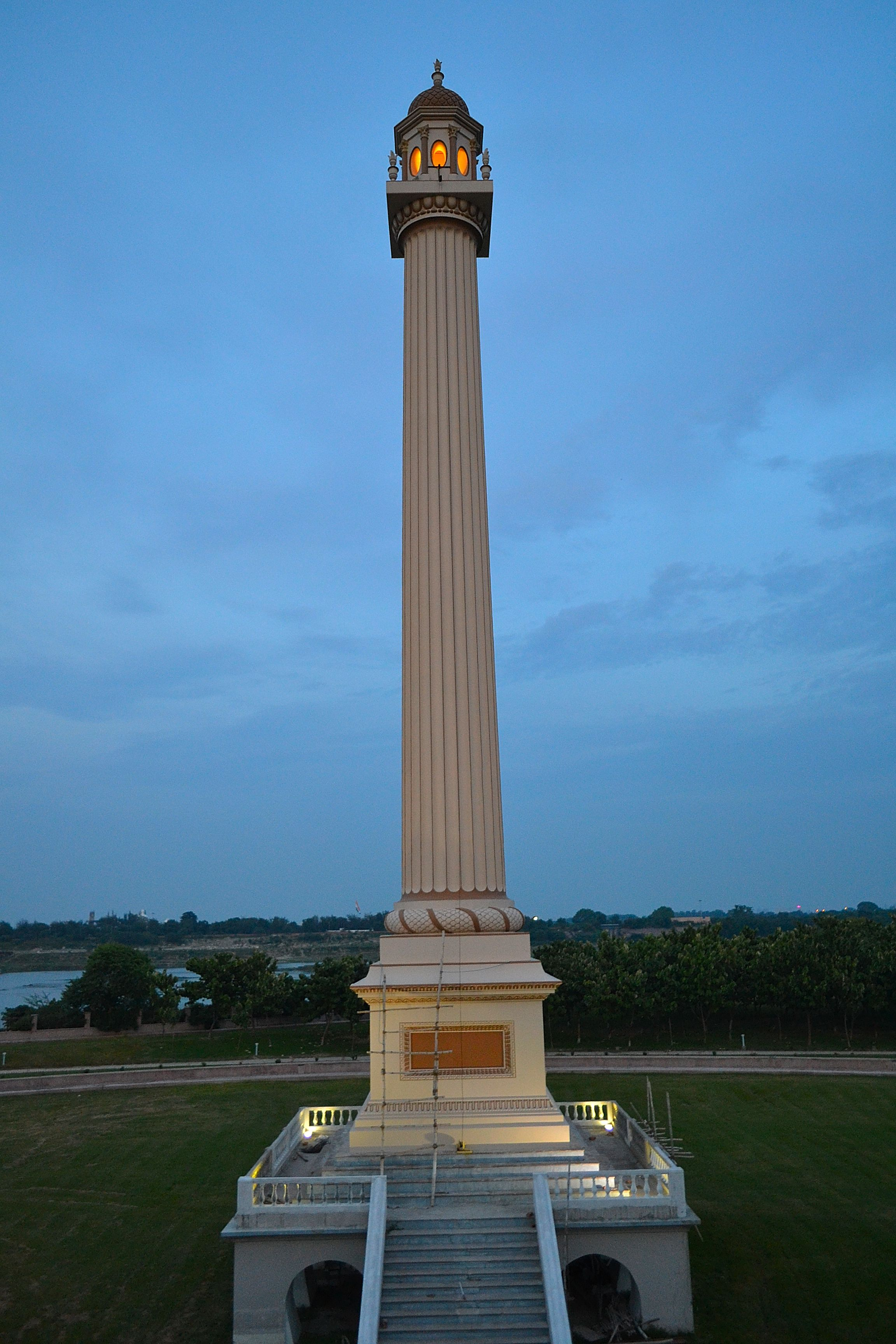
Laat at La Martinière, Lucknow

La Martinière Boys' College was founded by an endowment from the wealthy eighteenth-century Frenchman, Major-General Claude Martin (1735–1800), who was an officer in the French and later the British East India Company. Constantia, the palatial building which now houses the Boys' College, was built in 1785 as Martin's country residence, but was not completed until 1802, two years after Martin's death on 13 September 1800. Historians believe that the house takes its name from the school motto Labore et Constantia (Work and Constancy) which represents Martin's personal philosophy. There is a more romantic, though unproven, notion that the building was named after Constance, a young French girl who was supposedly Martin's first love.

Martin never married and he had no heirs. In his will, dated 1 January 1800, he left the bulk of his estate to provide for the establishment of three schools to be named La Martinière in his memory. The schools were to be located in Lucknow, Calcutta and at Lyon, his birthplace in France. The residue of his estate after bequests had been made to be used for the maintenance of these schools. He directed that the school in Lucknow should be established at Constantia and that the house should be kept as a "school or College for teaching young men the English language and Christian religion if they found themselves inclined". Martin instructed in his will that his 'body be salted, put in spirits or embalmed', and placed in a lead coffin in a vault beneath the house.

It is popularly believed that Martin was motivated not just by vanity but by a desire to protect his property after his death and to prevent his friend, the nawab, from acquiring it. By having himself, a Christian, buried beneath Constantia, he knew that the building would be permanently desecrated in the Muslim nawab's eyes. Chandan Mitra, in his book Constant Glory, thinks otherwise. He writes "Constantia's plans show that the basement mausoleum was part of the original scheme for the building and not included as an afterthought to guard against requisition."

Martin was duly interred in a specially prepared vault in the basement of the house. Thus, Constantia became both a school and a mausoleum. It is the largest European funerary monument in India, and the historian William Dalrymple has described it as "The East India Company's answer to the Taj Mahal".

== Early years ==
After Martin's death there were protracted disputes in the Calcutta High Court and consequently his will was not proved until 1840. In the interim the Constantia building was used as a guest house for visiting Europeans. The school finally opened on 1 October 1845 with some seventy boys on roll. The first Principal was John Newmarch.

Unlike the Calcutta La Martinière, the Lucknow school was technically established outside British territory so right from its inception its interaction with local society was frequent. There was also a native branch of the school in the Maqbara Amjad Ali Shah at Hazratganj in the centre of Lucknow. There were plans to move the native school to a different location, although it is not known whether this actually took place.

The first major challenge for the La Martinière School was the events of 1857 when it had to leave its premises and assisted in the defence of the Lucknow Residency.

=== La Martinière during the 1857 uprising ===
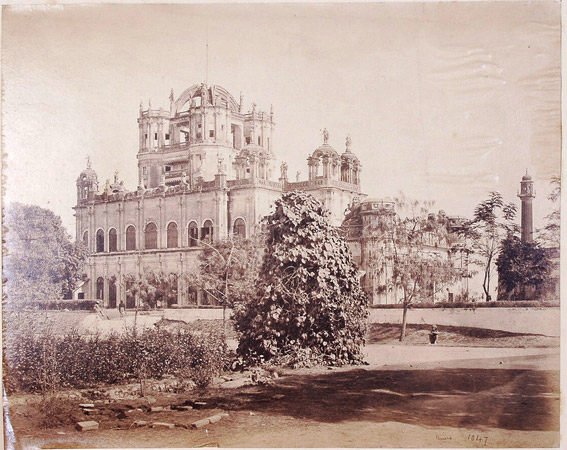
Constantia before the Indian Rebellion of 1857

In the events of 1857, eight staff members, sixty seven boys and one ensign (old boy) participated.

== After 1857 ==
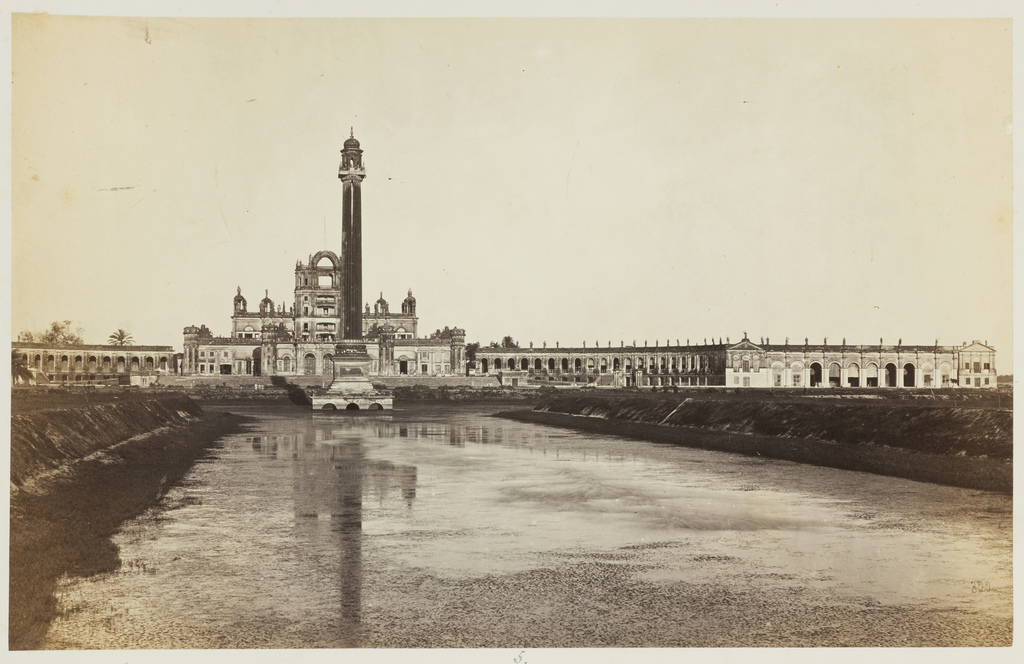
La Martinière in 1862 (Shepherd & Robertson)

La Martinière Lucknow, like its counterpart in Calcutta, expanded rapidly after the rebellion of 1857 There were 148 students on its rolls in 1859, but the number had increased to 277 by 1862. Boarders came from all over the province from districts like Pratapgarh, Mirzapur, Gorakhpur, Allahabad, Kanpur and Etawah.

The records show that in 1865 over 120 boys qualified for admission to the higher department of the Civil Engineering College at Roorkee.

In 1869, the La Martinière Girls' School was founded and in 1871 it moved to its present location in the compound of Khurshid Manzil. Initially the Girls' School was under the management of the Boys' School. The La Martinière College Principal was in overall charge of both the Boys' and Girls' Schools, with the Girls' school headed by a Lady Superintendent.

In 1945, the college celebrated its Centenary.

In wake of threat of invasion by the Japanese during the Second World War, the Calcutta Schools were re-located to Lucknow.

After Indian Independence, the curriculum was changed in 1947, with Urdu being dropped as a compulsory subject and replaced by Hindi. Many Anglo-Indians both students and Masters left for Britain and Australia. This trend was to continue till almost the mid-seventies.

In 1951, Meredith Doutre was appointed as the first Indian principal of the college. He was succeeded by Col HRH Daniels in the 1960s and then by Mr. DEW Shaw in the mid-1970s. The bulk of the students were drawn from the upper middle and middle classes.

In 1960, there was flooding of the grounds by the Gomti River resulting in the evacuation of staff and boys to higher ground. In 1962 and 1971 again major floods occurred which threatened the building. The Government constructed a protective bund in 1973–74 which separated the school lake from the main vista thus substantially reducing the earlier picturesque setting.

In 1976, the school was affiliated to the Indian Council for Secondary Education system of education. This entailed the exam for the Certificate of Secondary Education (class X) and the School Leaving Certificate (class XII).

In 1995, the school celebrated its sesquicentennial anniversary. To commemorate the occasion, a history of the college, Bright Renown, was released, an exhibition on the history of the school was organized, and for several days the Constantia was lit up in the night. The President of India released a postage stamp to recognize the contribution of La Martinière Lucknow.

In 1997 one of the teachers was murdered in the early hours of the morning on 7 March. Thirty-year-old Anglo-Indian Frederick Gomes, the college's assistant warden and physical training instructor, was murdered in his bungalow on the perimeter of the school grounds. Two people were seen firing shots through a broken window at the back of the building, but the culprits were not identified and the murder remains unsolved. However, the murder created a sensation in India at the time, especially when it was found that the school's students had access to guns. Newspaper columnist Saeed Naqvi, Ashank Mehrotra former pupils at the school commented: "The killing is a metaphor of our times. For such a level of violence to reach the sacred precincts of La Martinière is symbolic of the way that Lucknow, like so much of India, has completely ceased to be what it once was."

== History of the Girls' School ==
Unlike the schools in Calcutta and Lyons there had been no provision to found a girls' school in Lucknow. However funds were found from a female education fund and a school was started at Moti Mahal. The Lucknow Girls' School, as it was then known, was run by Mrs. Saunders Abbott. Following a land grant from the government the school was moved to its present location at Khursheed Manzil in 1871 and incorporated and established as a branch of La Martinière College.

== Principals ==
=== Boys' School ===
- John Newmarch was the first Principal of La Martinière, Lucknow, in 1845.
- Leonidas Clint (1845–1855), was the Principal of La Martinière, Lucknow, from about 1845 to 1855. He was a graduate of Trinity College, Cambridge. After leaving Martinière. Clint returned to the UK to take up holy orders. He was ordained as a deacon in 1859 and as a priest in 1861 (St David's). He was curate of Lamphey, Pembrokeshire (1859–1861), Hereford (1861–1863), Presteigne, Powys (1863–1865), and Brockhampton, Herefordshire (1865–1874). He was the vicar of Lingen, Herefordshire from 1874 to 1893. He was the editor of Dryden's Flower and Leaf and the author of Conic Sections. He died in Dewsbury, Yorkshire, aged 85.
- George Schilling (November 1855 - December 1855) Previously assistant master at La Martiniere Calcutta. He was the Principal during the siege of Lucknow in 1857.
- James W.H. Stobart (1855 - 1859)
- Thomas Gaskell Sykes (1859 - 1879)
- Lieutenant Thomas Percival Wood (1879 – 1909), was educated at Dulwich College, London, and Peterhouse, Cambridge. He was English 'Proviseur' at the Lycée Ampere in Lyons from 1906 to 1907. He was appointed Principal of La Martinière Lucknow in 1910. Wood was an officer of the Lucknow Volunteer Rifles, and offered his services in August 1914. He was promoted to the position of lieutenant in the Indian Army reserve in February 1915. After spending four months with the 1/7th Gurkha Rifles in Quetta, he was drafted to the Expeditionary Force in France, where he joined the 3rd Queen Alexandra's Own Gurkha Rifles in September 1915. He was killed at the Battle of Loos while gallantly leading his men in action. His name is commemorated on the Neuve-Chapelle memorial in France.
- CLS Garnett was the Principal from 1915 to 1920.
- Lt. Colonel Ralph S. Weir (1920-1926)
- Lt. Colonel William Edgar Andrews, Principal of the Boys' College from 1926 to 1951. Andrews moved to India in 1914 to take up a post as senior history and geography master at La Martinière Calcutta. In 1921 he was appointed Headmaster of the Boys' High School and College in Allahabad. He was appointed Principal of La Martinière Lucknow in 1926.
- Meredith Doutre (1951-1964), the first Indian Principal.
- Colonel Hector R H "Danny" Daniels. (1964-1973)
- Frank J deSouza (1974), in post for only a month (Jan-Feb). He built his retirement home in the college, which is now used as the college guest house.
- Desmond Shaw was a former pupil of La Martinière Boys from 1974 to 1986.
- Terence Phillips (1986-1990) was also a former pupil and was briefly Principal of the school.
- Elton Stein deSouza (1990-2011) was a former pupil who headed the school for around 20 years. He started raising funds for restoration of Constantia through College Souvenirs and Bollywood Film shootings.
- Carlyle Andre' McFarland (Macky) (2011-2024).
- Gary Dominic Everett (2024-present) was appointed Principal-Designate on 01 February 2024 and took over as the full-fledged Principal on 01 April 2024.

=== Girls' School ===
In the early years the Girls' School was led by a Lady Superintendent who reported to the Principal of the Boys' School.

==== Lady Superintendents ====
- 1869–1870 Miss Dixon
- 1870–1871 Mrs Marshall
- 1871–1872 Miss Wilson
- 1872–1878 Miss Auld
- 1879–1882 Miss Pennington
- 1883–1884 Miss Brenan Hayes
- 1885 Miss Mathews
- 1886–1889 Miss Granger
- 1890–1894 Miss Greenwood
- 1894–1897 Miss Young
- 1898–1901 Edith Annette Gow
- 1902–1906 Miss Stephenson Jellie

==== Principals ====
- 1907–1908 Miss Lavinia Teasdale was the first Principal and Honorary Secretary of the Girls' School.
- 1909–1915 Miss Ida Williams
- 1916–1923 Miss D. B. Oolving
- 1924–1937 Miss M. Chick
- 1937–1948 Margaret Grayhurst
- 1948–1950 Ellen Howe
- 1948–1950 Annette Gresseux
- 1951–1977 Mary Annette Gresseux was the first Indian Principal. She was responsible for the expansion of the school and the building of the infrastructure.
- 1978–1997 Florence Keelor
- 1997 – 12 February 2016 Farida Abraham
- 2017–present Aashrita Dass

== In popular culture ==
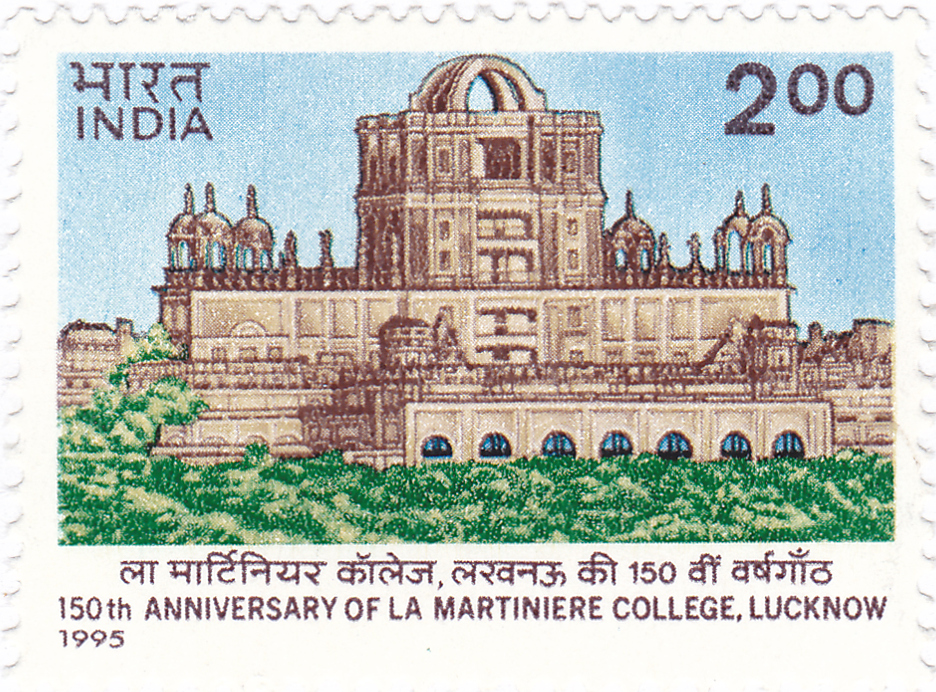
A 1995 stamp dedicated to the 150th anniversary of La Martiniere Lucknow

=== Film ===
The Boys' College has been the setting for films, including:

- Kim, a 1950 MGM adventure film starring Errol Flynn, Dean Stockwell (as Kim), Paul Lukas and Robert Douglas.
- Shakespeare Wallah, the 1965 Merchant Ivory Productions film loosely based on the real-life adventures of Felicity Kendal's family.
- Shatranj Ke Khiladi (The Chess Players), the 1977 film by Satyajit Ray.
- Stones of the Raj: The French Connection, a 1997 documentary for Channel 4 television by William Dalrymple.
- Gadar: Ek Prem Katha, a 2001 Bollywood movie starring Sunny Deol, Amisha Patel, and Amrish Puri.
- Indra, a 2002 Tollywood movie starring Chiranjeevi and Sonali Bendre.
- Anwar, a 2007 Bollywood movie starring Nauheed Cyrusi.
- Always Kabhi Kabhi, a 2011 Bollywood movie starring Ali Fazal (a former pupil) Giselle Monteiro, Zoa Morani, Satyajit Dubey, a directorial debut for Roshan Abbas and was produced under Shahrukh Khan's production house Red Chillies Entertainment. A film by Roshan Abbas, also a Martinian.
- Jaanisaar, a 2015 film by former pupil Muzaffar Ali. When Raja Amir, an Indian prince raised in London, returns to India, he falls for Noor, a revolutionary courtesan. However, while her loyalties lie with India, his lie with the British Raj.
- Prassthanam, a 2019 Indian Political action film. Another film where ex-Martinian Ali Fazal played an important role.
- Gunjan Saxena, A 2020 film that stars Janhvi Kapoor as Indian Air Force pilot Gunjan Saxena, one of the first Indian female air-force pilots in combat, alongside Pankaj Tripathi and Angad Bedi in supporting roles.
- Madam Chief Minister is a 2020 Indian Hindi-language political drama film directed by Subhash Kapoor. The film stars Richa Chadda in the lead role. The film's official announcement was made by Chadda on 12 February 2020.

=== Literature and fiction ===
Rudyard Kipling's 1901 novel Kim tells of the adventures of Kimball O'Hara, the orphaned son of a British soldier. Kim is given the chance to go to St Xavier's School in Lucknow, the most prestigious school in British India. St Xavier's is a fictional creation but Kipling authorities believe that the school is modelled on real-life picturesque La Martinière College, Lucknow.

The Indian writer Allan Sealy, a former pupil of the school, set his first novel Trotter-Nama in the old house, which he renamed as Sans Souci (carefree). The school has also featured in short stories.

== Postage stamps ==
The two La Martinière schools in Lucknow are one of the few educational institution in India, and possibly in the world, depicted on postage stamps.

On 1 October 1995, on the 150th anniversary of the school's opening, Dr. Shankar Dayal Sharma, the then President of India, released a two-rupee postage stamp in the school's honour.

In 2007 when the girls' school celebrated its 138th anniversary, it was given a similar honour and a first-day cover was issued by Department of Posts with a picture of Khursheed Manzil on it.

== Curriculum ==
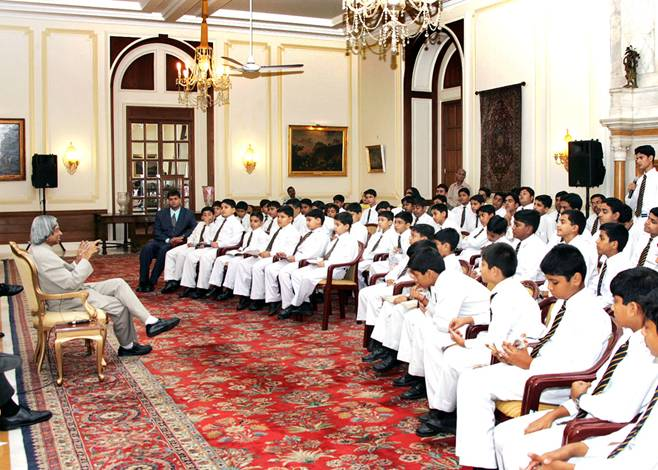
Abdul Kalam, the 11th President of India, is seen talking with the top students of La Martinière Lucknow.

The academic curriculum includes Mathematics, both English Language and Literature, History and Civics, Geography, Principles of Accounts, Commercial Studies, Science, Art, Craft and Woodwork, Choral Singing, Hindi, Sanskrit and the French language (both up to Class VIII), Computer Studies and Physical Education (three times a week until Class 10).

Class 10 students are prepared for the Indian Certificate of Secondary Education and for the Indian School Certificate Examination when they are in Class 12.

The four streams at 10+2 stage are Humanities, Commerce, Life Sciences and Physical Sciences.

== Sports facilities ==
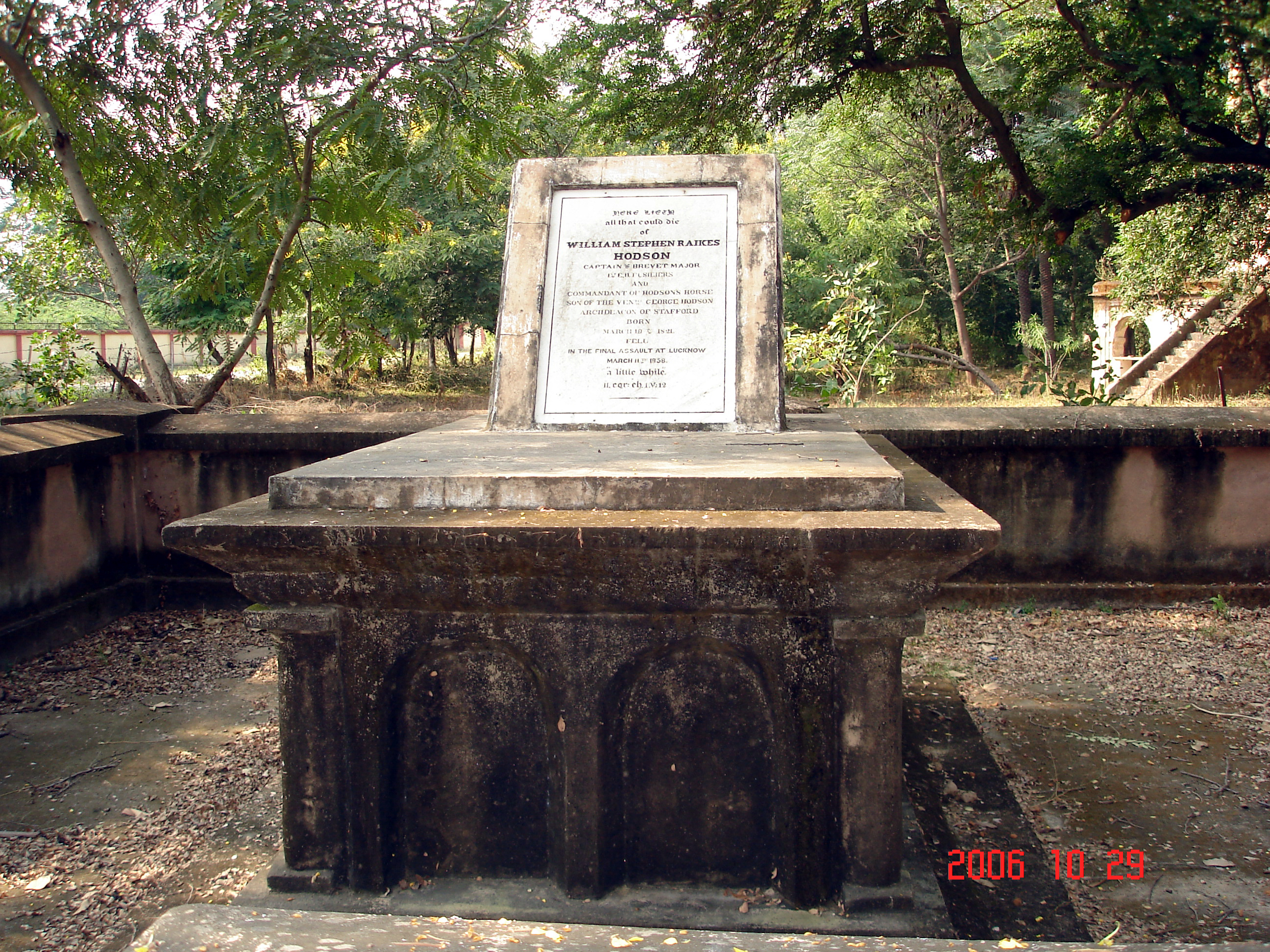
Brevet Major William Hodson's memorial and grave

The college has extensive facilities for sports. There are two sports fields, known as the Polo Ground and the Fairy Dale Ground. The polo ground, as its name suggests, was originally used for polo games. Today it plays host to football and athletics. It is also the venue for the physical training displays on Annual Sports Day. Cricket and hockey are played at the Fairy Dale Ground. There is a large gym for gymnastics, a skating rink, an indoor shooting range, a Rugby field and an indoor swimming pool. The college also has a volleyball court, a basketball court, a swimming pool and lawn tennis courts. In all there are 10 Football fields, 8 Hockey fields, 2 Basketball courts, 2 Swimming Pools, A Paddock, 2 Cricket Arenas,

The college has five combative sports: judo, taekwondo, Muay Thai, karate and boxing. The school has stables for horse-riding, and an archery range.

The college has an Aviation Club where aviation sport is taught. The boys assemble aero model kits both control line and Remote Controlled. The Aeromodelling club is equipped with a simulator, a briefing room, test benches and a host of other equipment. The boys are prepared to appear for the Student Pilot Licence for Fixed Wing Aircraft. Power flying on Cessna 152B is scheduled to commence shortly.

== Coat of arms ==
The La Martinière coat of arms was designed by the founder Claude Martin. The coat of arms and the motto Labore et Constantia are now shared by all the schools founded by Martin. The La Martiniere College flag consists of the coat of arms on a blue and gold background. The flag is flown above the buildings, and used for formal events and celebrations, such as the annual Founder's Day.

== See also ==
- La Martiniere Calcutta
- La Martiniere College
- La Martiniere Lyon
- Claude Martin
- Category:La Martinière College, Lucknow alumni
- Martin Purwa
- The will of Claude Martin
- Vive La Martiniere, the school song by Frederick James Rowe
- Claude Martin Wade, a Colonel named after Claude Martin
- Zamindar
