= Allan Sealy =

Indian writer (born 1951)

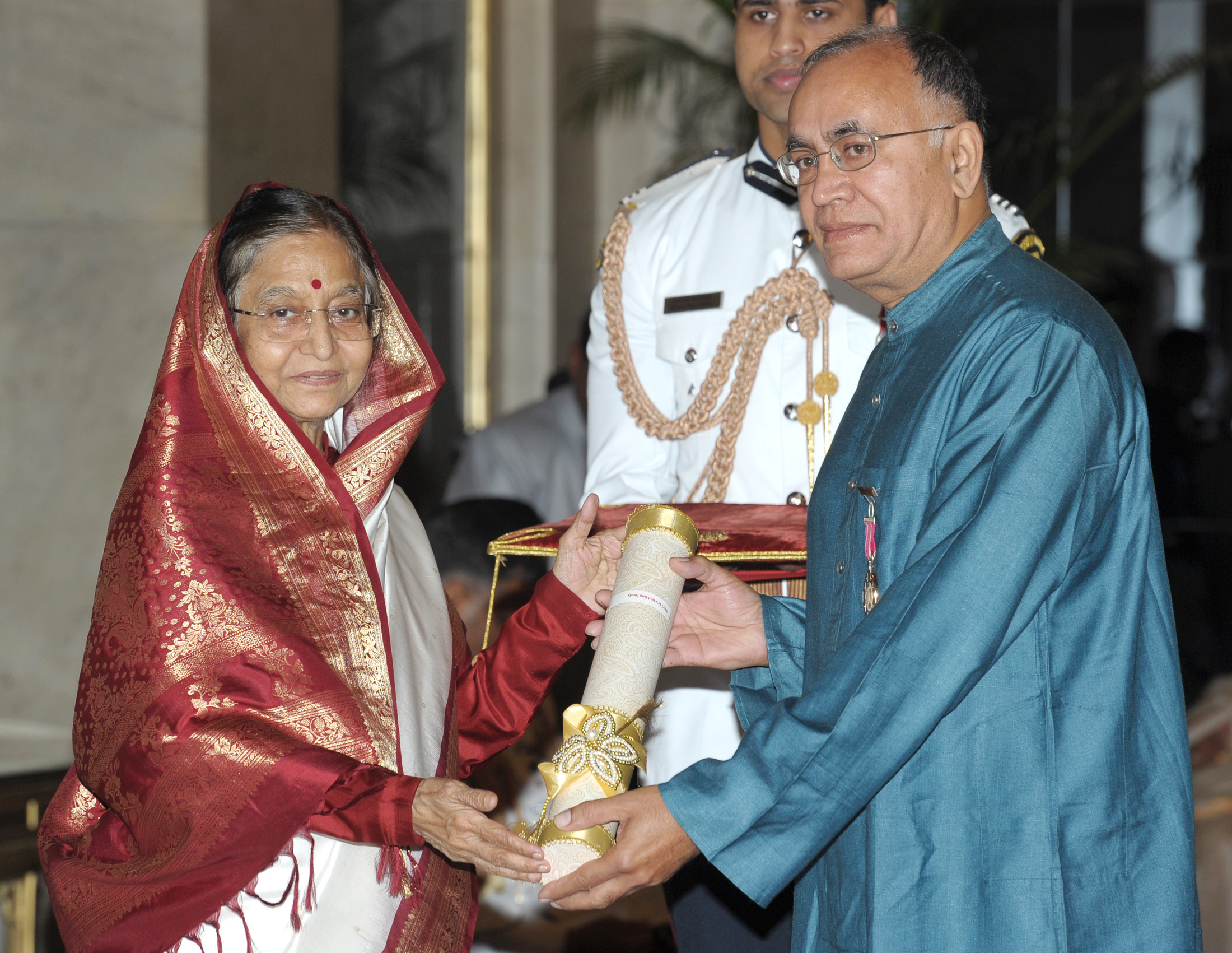
- Sealy is awarded the Padma Shri.
- Born: 1951 (age 74–75); Allahabad, Uttar Pradesh, India
- Occupation: Writer
- Writing career
- Period: 1990-present

Allan Sealy (born 1951) is an Indian writer. His novel The Everest Hotel: A Calendar was shortlisted for the 1998 Booker Prize.

== Biography ==
Sealy was born in Allahabad, attended La Martiniere College in Lucknow, and then on to St. Stephen's College, Delhi University.

His first novel The Trotter Nama was published in 1990 and tells the story of seven generations of an Anglo-Indian family.

== Awards ==
- Commonwealth Writers' Prize, Best First Book, Europe and South Asia, in 1990
- Sahitya Akademi Award in 1991
- Crossword Book Award in 1998
- Padma Shri in 2012

== List of works ==
- The Trotter-Nama: A Chronicle, (New York: Knopf, 1988; London: Penguin Books, 1990; New York: Viking Penguin, 1990) ISBN 0-14-010210-8.
- Hero: A Fable, (London: Secker and Warburg, 1991, 288pp) ISBN 0-436-44478-X.
- From Yukon to Yukatan: a Western Journey, (London: Secker & Warburg, 1994., 323pp) ISBN 0-436-44479-8.
- The Everest Hotel: A Calendar, (London: Doubleday, 1998, 331pp) ISBN 0-385-41033-6.
- The Brainfever Bird, (London: Picador, 2003, 320pp) ISBN 0-330-41143-8.
- Red: An Alphabet (London: Picador, 2006, 343pp) ISBN 0-330-41147-0.
- The Small Wild Goose Pagoda: An Almanack (New Delhi: Aleph, 2014, 300pp) ISBN 978-9383064489.
- Zelaldinus: A Masque (New Delhi: Aleph/Almost Island, 2017, 168pp) ISBN 978-9386021076.
- Asoca: A Sutra (New Delhi: Penguin Random House, 2021, 392pp) ISBN 978-9354920639.
