= Lycée La Martinière Monplaisir =

Non-denominational private school

Coordinates: 45.7400°N 4.8700°E

The Lycée La Martinière Monplaisir is the La Martinière College branch in Lyon, France. Lyon hosts three La Martinière colleges, which were all created by Claude Martin: La Martinière Monplaisir, La Martinière Duchère, and La Martinière Terreaux.

The Lumière brothers, two of the first filmmakers, attended La Martinière.

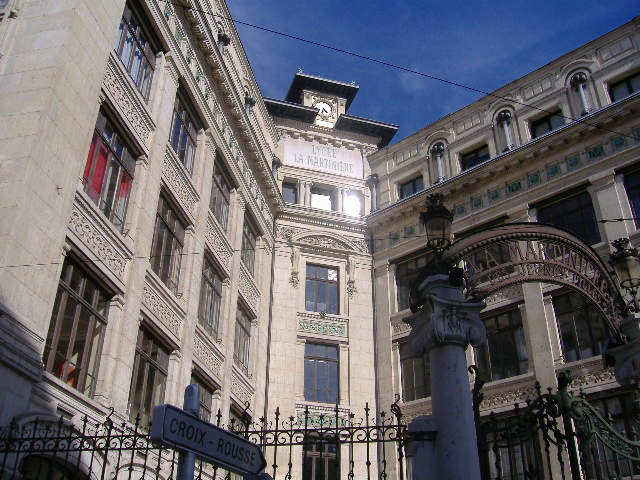
La Martinière Terreaux, for girls

== The Founder ==
Claude Martin was born on the 5th of January 1735 in Lyon, France. He went to India when he was seventeen. After the French influence declined in India, he served in the British East India Company and rose to the rank of Major-General. After taking up residence in Lucknow, he occupied an important position in the court of Nawab Shuja-ud-Daulah, the third Nawab of Oudh, and later his son, Asaf-ud-Daula.

During this period he succeeded in accumulating a fortune of about 4,000,000 rupees. He built the palace of 'Constantia' and his fine house of Farud Baksh, both of which he equipped with luxuries that included a library of some 4,000 volumes written in many languages and a picture gallery containing a fine collection of works of art.

He died in Lucknow on September 13, 1800. According to his will, he was buried in the vault prepared for his remains in the basement of the college in Lucknow.

The major portion of his monies and estate was left for founding three institutions, one each at Lucknow, Kolkata, and his birthplace Lyon in France.

== La Martinière coat of arms ==
The La Martinière coat of arms was designed by the founder Claude Martin. It is supported by seven flags, each bearing the design of a fish, the emblem of Oudh. The devices on the escutcheon appear to epitomise Claude Martin's life. The ship recalls his voyage to India where he established his fortune. The lion with the pennant represents his career as an officer in the East India Company and with the Nawab of Oudh The setting sun behind the castellated building to the right of the shield has been said to point to the sunset of his days and the large part which the building of "Constantia" played in his later years. The coat of arms and the accompanying motto Labore et Constantia are now shared by all the schools founded by Martin.

The La Martinière College flag consists of the coat of arms on a blue and gold background. The flag is generally flown above the buildings, and used for formal events and celebrations, such as the annual Founder's Day.

== See also ==
- Category:La Martinière Lyon alumni
- La Martinière College
- La Martinière Calcutta
- La Martinière College, Lucknow
- Claude Martin
- The will of Claude Martin
- Vive La Martinière, the school song by Frederick James Rowe
- Charles-Henri Tabareau
