= La Martinière Calcutta =

Private Anglican school in Kolkata, India

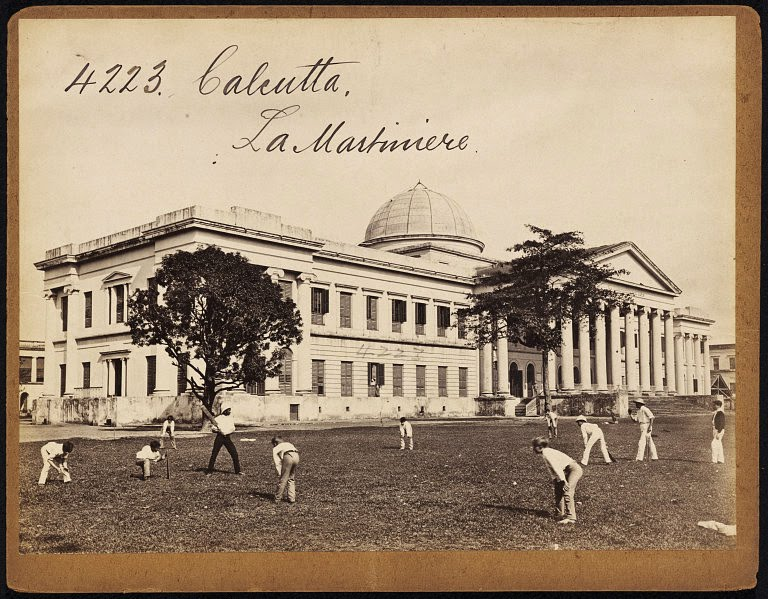
- La Martinière Calcutta (c. 1850–1870) by Francis Frith

Location
- 11, Loudon Street (Boys); 4, Rawdon Street (Girls) 54; Kolkata, West Bengal 700 017; India; 22°32′31.63″N 88°21′23.80″E

Information
- Type: Private
- Motto: Labore et Constantia (By Labour and Constancy)
- Religious affiliation: Christian (Anglican)
- Denomination: Church of North India
- Established: 1 March 1836; 190 years ago
- Founder: Major General Claude Martin
- Sister school: La Martinière Lucknow; La Martinière Lyon
- School board: ICSE (year 10); ISC (year 12)
- Session: April to March
- Chairman: The Rt. Rev. (Dr.) Paritosh Canning (Diocese of Calcutta)
- Principal: Sydney Francis Menezes (Boys); Rupkatha Sarkar (Girls)
- Age: 2+ to 18+
- Language: English
- Campus type: Urban
- Houses: Hastings (Red), Charnock (Green), Martin (Blue), Macaulay (Yellow)
- Colours: White, Black and Amber (Boys); White and Dark Blue (Girls)
- Song: "Hail! Hail! The name we own" by Frederick James Rowe
- Yearbook: The Chronicle (Boys)
- Affiliation: Council for the Indian School Certificate Examinations
- Alumni: Old Martinians
- Benefactor: Paul Chater
- Website: lamartiniereforboys.co (Boys) lamartiniereforgirls.co (Girls)

La Martinière (informally known as LMC) comprises two independent private single-sex schools for day scholars, with a few boarders, located in Kolkata (formerly Calcutta), West Bengal, India. They were established in 1836 in accordance with the will of the French soldier of fortune and philanthropist, Major General Claude Martin. They are Christian schools, controlled by the Anglican Church of North India and independent from the government, with English as the primary language of instruction. La Martiniere Calcutta is often ranked among the best day schools in the country. It is affiliated to the Council for the ISC Examinations New Delhi, which conducts the ICSE & ISC Examinations at the close of Classes 10 and 12.

== History ==
=== Founder of the school ===
La Martinière, Calcutta, was founded by Major General Claude Martin, a French soldier, born and brought up in Lyon, France in 1735. Claude Martin came from a bourgeois family in France, where his father was a casket maker. Not stepping into his father’s shoes, Martin decided to go into the French army. As part of the army, Claude Martin was sent to Pondicherry, India, in 1752, to serve as a troop member of the French army stationed in India. From 1752-63, Claude Martin served in the French Army before joining the East India Company. As part of the British Army, Claude Martin was stationed to serve in the Calcutta base of the Company. Later, Martin commanded the cavalry for the Nawab of Awadh, Shuja-ud-Daula. During his military career in India, Martin became known as a reputable soldier and commander and became very wealthy.

As part of his job, Martin traveled a lot between Calcutta (modern-day Kolkata) and Awadh (modern-day Lucknow). Inspired by Masonic ideas, Martin decided to set up relief measures and charities to help the poor in Lucknow and Kolkata. Among his many pursuits, Martin wanted to set up educational institutions in both these cities, and left a large portion of his wealth for the founding of such schools in his will, before dying in 1800.

Claude Martin in his will, regarding the founding of La Martinière Calcutta, writes:

"I give and bequeath the sum of two hundred thousand Sika Rupees to the town of Calcutta for to be put at interest in Government Paper or the most secure mode possible, and this principal and interest to be put under the protection of Government, or the Supreme Court, that they may devise an institution the most necessary for the public good of the town of Calcutta, or establishing a School for to educate a certain number of children of any sex to a certain age, and to have them put prentice to some profession, when at the conclusion of their school and to have them married when at age, and also wishes that every year premium of few rupees or other thing and a medal be given to the most deserving or virtuous boy and girl or both to such that have come out of the school".

=== Establishment and Early Curriculum ===
The settlement and enforcement of Martin’s will were complicated and required significant legal proceedings. Nearly 40 years after Claude Martin’s death, in 1840, the Supreme Court of Kolkata finally approved Martin’s will and gave permission for the establishment of La Martiniere, Calcutta, with one school for boys and one for girls. The rules and regulations for the La Martiniere Schools in Calcutta were founded in 1836 and reflect the educational priorities of that era. The primary objective of the schools was to equip the children with the skills required to earn an honest livelihood.

The curriculum for boys included English, grammar, writing, geography, history (with a particular emphasis on Britain and British India), Hindustani, Bengali, mathematics, natural history, and mechanical philosophy.[3] Girls were taught the same subjects, with the exception of mathematics and mechanical philosophy, and also learned needlework, knitting, straw plaiting, and music. Classes were held six days a week, and students had half a day off on Saturdays. Regular breaks were taken during Easter and Christmas, and the anniversary of Claude Martin's death (13 Sep) was also celebrated as a holiday, with a dinner for the students and medals awarded to deserving boys and girls. The school was rescued out of financial distress by a INR 1.1 million donation from old Martinian Sir Paul Chater in 1925.

=== Founder's Day ===
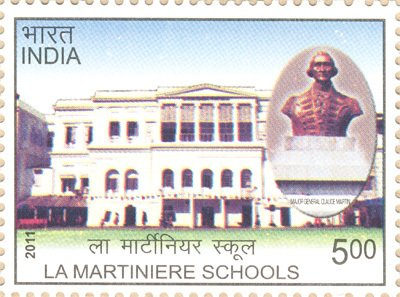
Stamp of India 2011 La Martiniere Schools

Founder's Day continues to be celebrated on 13 September every year with a service in the school hall, usually, although not always, attended by an Old Martinian as the Chief Guest, and medals awarded to students. The Founders Gold Medal (for academics) and silver medal for Good Conduct have been awarded since the school's founding with the Principal's Medals for Best Sportsman and Best All-Round Student being awarded from 1960 onwards. There is also a social dance attended by the senior boys and girls and a football match between the school team and a team representing La Martiniere Old Boys.

== See also ==
- List of Martinians
- List of schools in Kolkata
- List of schools in West Bengal
