= History of suits =

A man's suit of clothes, in the sense of a lounge, office, business, dinner or dress suit, is a set of garments which are crafted from the same cloth. This article discusses the history of the lounge suit, often called a business suit when featuring dark colors and a conservative cut.

== Men's suits ==
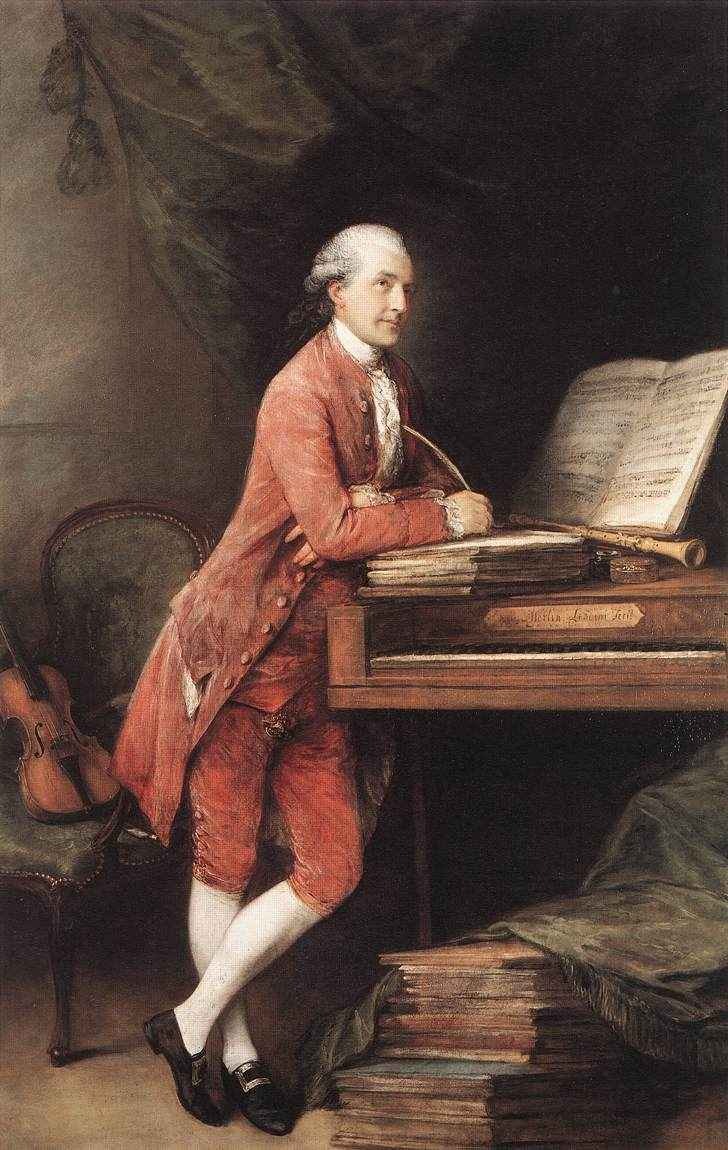
Johann Christian Fischer, composer, in matching coat, waistcoat, and breeches, by Thomas Gainsborough, ca. 1780.

The suit is a traditional form of men's formal clothes in the Western world. For some four hundred years, suits of matching coat, trousers, and waistcoat have been in and out of fashion. The modern lounge suit's derivation is visible in the outline of the brightly coloured, elaborately crafted royal court dress of the 17th century (suit, wig, knee breeches), which was shed because of the French Revolution. This evolution is seen more recently in British tailoring's use of steam and padding in moulding woolen cloth, the rise and fall in popularity of the necktie, and the gradual disuse of waistcoats and hats in the last fifty years.

The modern lounge suit appeared in the late 19th century, but traces its origins to the simplified, sartorial standard of dress established by King Charles II of England in 1666. The restored monarch, Charles II, per the example of King Louis XIV's court at Versailles, decreed that in the English court men would wear a long coat, a waistcoat (then called a "petticoat"), a cravat (a precursor of the necktie), a wig, knee breeches (trousers), and a hat.

=== Regency ===
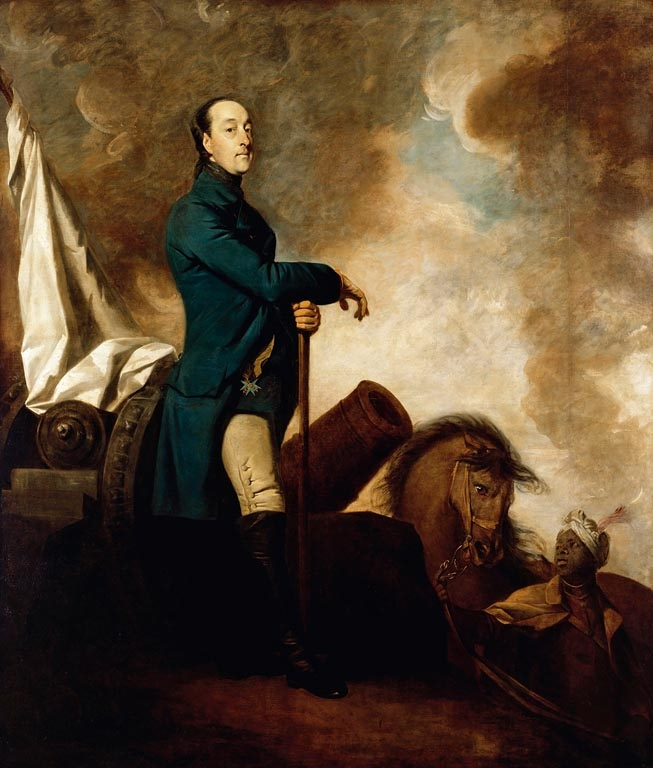
The beginnings of modern suits depicted

In the early 19th century, British dandy Beau Brummell redefined, adapted, and popularized the style of the British court in Europe. Leading European men began wearing well-cut, tailored suits recognizable today. The simplicity of the new clothes and their somber colors contrasted strongly with the extravagant, foppish styles just before. Brummell's influence introduced the modern era of men's clothing which now includes the modern suit jacket, full-length pants, and necktie. Paintings from the 1760s reveal how the modern coat design with lapels emerged. It can be seen in the hunting scene with Count Carl Emil Ulrich von Donop as subject by an unknown artist and William, Count of Schaumburg-Lippe in Hanoverian Field Marshall uniform painted by Joshua Reynolds.

In this regency period, the predominant upper-class clothing introduced by Brummell for day wear was a tightly fitting, dark coloured tailcoat with non-matching (usually pale) trousers, pale waistcoat, white shirt and cravat and tall boots.

=== Victorian and Gilded Age ===
Towards the start of the Victorian period and the Gilded Age, the frock coat, initially not just black, became popular, and quickly became the standard daily clothing for gentlemen. From the middle of the 19th century, a new (then informal) coat, the morning coat, became acceptable. It was a less formal garment, with a cut away front, making it suitable for wearing while riding. Morning dress and the frock coat garments were not suits, because they were worn with trousers that didn't match in color or fabric; a matching waistcoat and trousers were considered informal and could be described using the short-lived term ditto suit. The frock coat was still the standard garment for all formal or business occasions, and a tailcoat was worn in the evenings.

Towards the end of the 19th century, the modern lounge suit was born as a very informal garment meant only to be worn for sports, in the country, or at the seaside. The lounge jacket was derived from the paletot coat style, which was loosely cut coat with no waist seam, where the skirt being of one piece with the upper half (unlike the frock coat, which had a seamed waist. The lounge jacket was shaped by darting the front panels from the underarm to the waist.

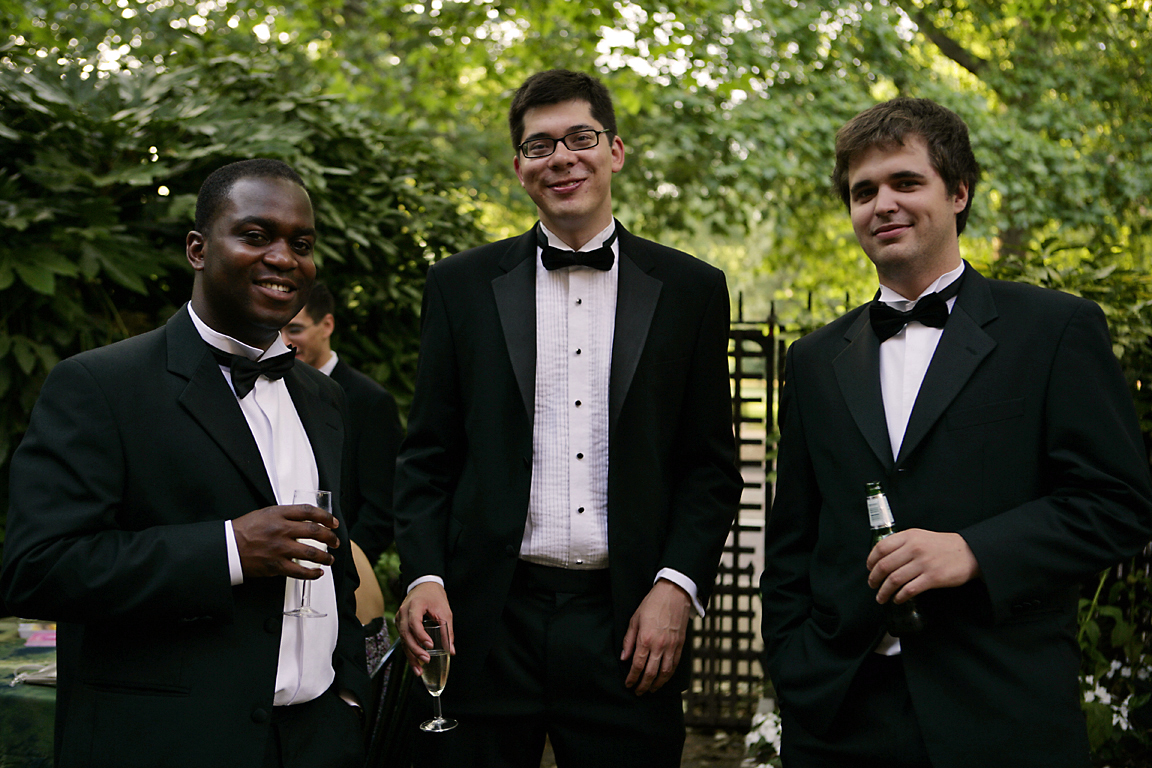
Three men in 2006 wearing black tie variations.

Parallel to this, the dinner jacket was invented and came to be worn for informal evening events, beginning in 1888. It was descended from white tie (the dress code associated with the evening tailcoat) but quickly became a full new garment, the dinner jacket, with a new dress code, initially known as 'dress lounge' and later black tie. When it was imported to the United States, it became known as the tuxedo. The 'dress lounge' was originally worn only for small private gatherings and white tie ('White tie and tails') was still worn for large formal events. The 'dress lounge' slowly became more popular for larger events as an alternative to full evening dress in white tie.

=== Edwardian ===
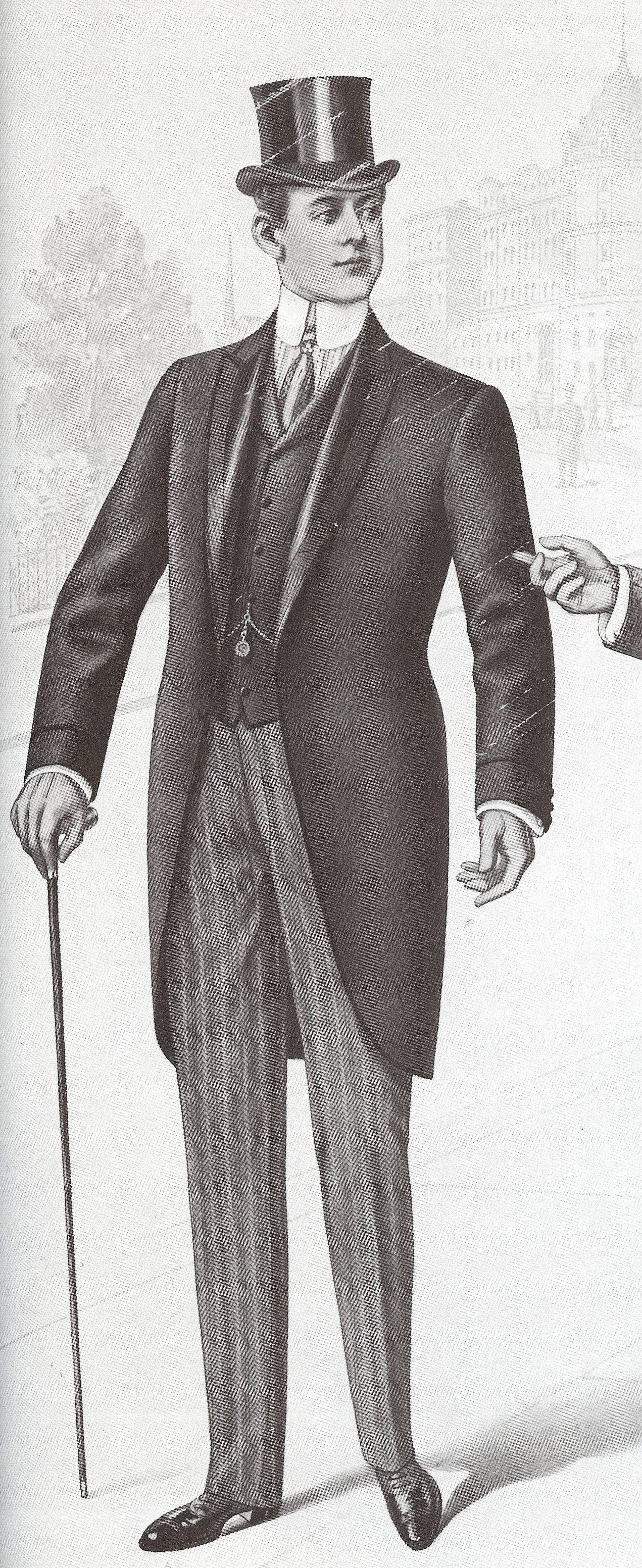
1901, a man in a morning coat.

The beginning of the Edwardian era in the early 20th century brought a steady decline in the wearing of frock coats and the birth of the suit that is recognizable today. The tailcoat began losing interest among upper classes in the United States and Europe. Meanwhile, the morning suit rose in relative formality, first becoming acceptable for businessmen, then becoming standard dress for upper classes. The lounge suit was slowly accepted as being correct outside its original settings and began to be seen in town. While still reserved for private gatherings, usually with no ladies, black tie became more common.

In North America, the sack suit, a cut of the lounge suit, saw a large rise in popularity, and, except for the shoulders, it is unfitted, loose, and informal, as it has no darts.

=== Inter-war ===
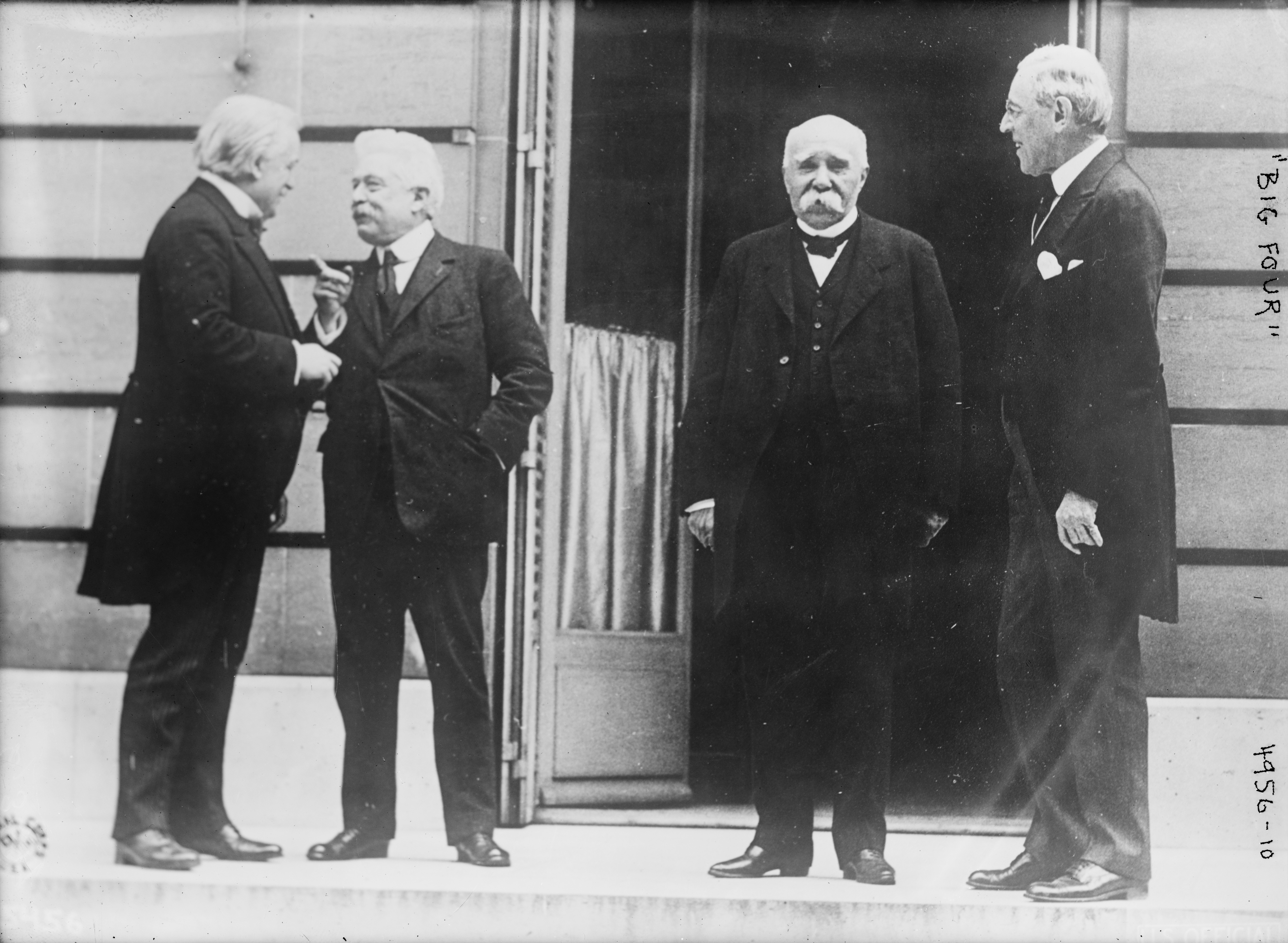
At the Treaty of Versailles signing in 1919, the heads of government wore morning dress and lounge suits for informal meetings (as seen here), but frock coats for formal daytime meetings.

In the 1920s men began wearing wide, straight-legged trousers with their suits. These trousers normally measured 23 inches (58 cm) around the cuff. Younger men often wore even wider-legged trousers which were known as "Oxford bags". Trousers also began to be worn cuffed shortly after World War I, and this style persisted until World War II due to rationing. Trousers first began to be worn creased in the 1920s. Trousers were worn very highly waisted throughout the 1920s, and this fashion remained in vogue until the 1940s. Single-breasted suits were in style throughout the 1920s and the double-breasted suit was mainly worn by older more conservative men. In the 1920s, very fashionable men would often wear double-breasted waistcoats (with four buttons on each side) with single-breasted coats. Lapels on single-breasted suits were fashionably worn peaked and were often wide. In the early 1930s these styles continued and were often even further exaggerated, resulting in the introduction of what came to be called the leisure suit.

Before 1935 (and again in the 1970s) men preferred snugly tailored coats and waistcoats. In 1935, a complete change in style occurred. Loose fitting coats were introduced, trousers began to be tapered at the bottom and suit coats began to have tapered arms. These new trends were only reluctantly accepted by men at first. At first the waistcoat continued to be made in the traditional fitted and snug style. By 1940, the waistcoat began to be made in a loose style which made it uncomfortable to wear. In fashion magazines of the day, men complained how these new vests continually rode up when they happen to sit down or bend over. Fashionable men changed their preference to the double-breasted suit coat at this time and it remained in fashion for the next two decades.

By this time, morning dress was solidified as business wear.

=== Post-war ===
Reflecting the democratization of wealth and larger trend toward simplification in the decades following the Second World War, the suit was standardized and streamlined. Suit coats were cut as straight as possible without any indication of a waistline, and by the 1960s the lapel had become narrower than at any time prior. Cloth rationing during the war had forced significant changes in style, contributing to a large reduction in the popularity of cuts such as the double-breasted suit.

The New York Times Style Magazine explains one iconic suit of the era, the gray flannel suit:

Back in 1955, when denim was the height of rebelliousness, Sloan Wilson's novel The Man in the Gray Flannel Suit turned a men's classic into a synonym for drab, middle-class conformity . . . Flannel had humble beginnings — the name is reputedly derived from "gwlanen," Welsh for woolen cloth — and was used for underwear in the 19th century. In the 1880s white flannel was worn for summer sports; by the 1920s the more seasonless gray had become a favorite. When the Prince of Wales wore gray flannel trousers on his 1924 trip to America, they were aped by collegiates on both sides of the Atlantic. Cary Grant and Fred Astaire then carried the trend through to the 1940s. The archetypal square of the postwar era was later described by Esquire's style encyclopedia as 'a neat, circumspect, conservative man who carried an attaché case and regarded a pink button-down shirt as his one sartorial fling'

In the late 1960s and early 1970s the Nehru jacket, an Indian style featuring a mandarin collar, was introduced by entertainers such as Johnny Carson and The Beatles, and saw a brief surge in popularity across Western Europe and the United States.

In the 1970s, a snug-fitting suit coat became popular once again, also encouraging the return of the waistcoat. This new three-piece style became closely associated with disco culture, and was specifically popularized by the film Saturday Night Fever. Fashion brands such Haggar meanwhile started to introduce the concept of "suit separates", a production innovation that reduced the need for excessive customization.

The 1980s saw a trend towards the simplification of the suit once again. The jacket became looser and the waistcoat was completely dispensed with. A few suit makers continued to make waistcoats, but these tended to be cut low and often had only four buttons. The waistline on the suit coat moved down again in the 1980s to a position well below the waist. By 1985-1986, three-piece suits were on the way out and making way for cut double-breasted and two-piece single-breasted suits.

The late 1990s saw the return to popularity of the three-button two-piece suit, which then went back out of fashion some time in the first decade of the twenty-first century.

== Women's suits ==
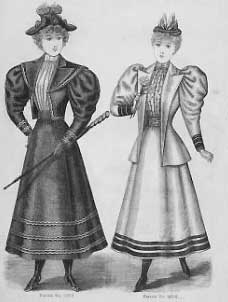
Women's walking suits, 1894, from the Butterick pattern company's Delineator

The earliest women's suits were riding habits, which consisted of a tailored coat or jacket and matching skirt from the 1660s. Practical and sturdy, riding habits were worn not only on horseback, but also for travel and other daytime pursuits. Jacket-and-skirt ensembles not intended for riding appeared in the later 19th century. Both riding habits and walking suits reflected the skirt and sleeve styles of the day. Until the 1910s, coat and skirt ensembles were usually described as "costumes" rather than suits, and the term "suit", as applied to such sets, was not usual until after the First World War.

In the first half of the twentieth century, the skirted suit became the common daytime city costume for women, in the workplace and out; dressmaker suits featured softer fabrics and "feminine" details, and cocktail suits were worn for semi-formal occasions in mid-century. The Chanel suit and variations thereof were popular business attire in the 1950s and 1960s.

Yves Saint Laurent introduced his "Le Smoking" tuxedo suit in 1966, shocking the fashion world by designing two and three-piece suits specifically for the female body.

Pantsuits (women's suits with Eastern style trousers) were introduced by designer André Courrèges in 1964, but were only gradually accepted as business or streetwear attire; with the rise of the late 1960s feminist movement, they became acceptable office wear in the early 1970s. A white-collar woman's suit of skirt, tailored shirt, and floppy tie evolved in the 1970s and 1980s, as documented in the 1975 book, Dress for Success.

== Contemporary trends ==
Although the man's European tailored suit is commonly perceived as the ultimate conservative costume of Western culture, Eastern influences or extravagant variations on the tailored suit have been adopted by many subcultures over the last century as a matter of fashion or social identity. As early as 1922, Emily Post addressed what she termed the "freak American suit" in her influential guide Etiquette:

You will see it everywhere, on Broadway of every city and Main Street of every town, on the boardwalks and beaches of coast resorts, and even in remote farming villages. It comes up to hit you in the face year after year in all its amazing variations: waist-line under the arm pits, "trick" little belts, what-nots in the cuffs; trousers so narrow you fear they will burst before your eyes, pockets placed in every position, buttons clustered together in a tight little row or reduced to one. Such progressive styles may not reflect the international tastes or etiquette.

Some of the non-traditional tailored suit styles of the past century include:

- The Jazz suit of the early 1920s were extremely high-waisted and snug-fitting and were worn with trousers which were quite high-waisted and trouser legs were short and revealed the wearer's socks.
- The Zoot suit of the late 1930s and 1940s.
- The Western suit, a form of western wear featuring a tailored jacket with "western" details such as pointed yokes or arrowhead pockets.
- The Nudie suit, a highly decorated form of western wear.
- The Ivy League style of simplified, understated suits and casual clothing was popular for young men from the mid-1950s until the end of the 1960s, when it was supplanted by the flared, colorful styles of the peacock revolution and the influences of the hippie counterculture.
- The Beatle suit, inspired by Pierre Cardin's collarless jackets, derived from Edwardian suits and the Indian Nehru jacket.
- The Mod suit, a fashion of the 1960s, and again in the early 2010s. Characteristics include a very slim cut, narrow lapels, three or four buttons and a strongly tapered waist. Usually single-breasted and grey. The cloth generally consists in part of mohair, tonic, houndstooth, or two-tone fabric.
- The Safari suit, a fashion of the 1970s. Patterned after military dress uniforms worn in hot climates, it consisted of (long, but sometimes short) trousers and short-sleeved jacket with patch pockets of a light suiting fabric, typically of beige or pastel shades of blue and green. It was worn with a short-sleeved shirt, mostly of open neck design, but occasionally with a tie. Another style associated with this was the leisure suit, which had a long-sleeved shirt-like jacket.
- The Disco suit, a fashion of the 1970s with wide lapels and flared trousers and usually necktie omitting, often in white or brightly coloured polyester fabric, the jacket was based on the jackets popular in the 1930s. This style was epitomized by John Travolta's suit in the 1976 film Saturday Night Fever.
- The short-lived leisure suit also appeared in the 1970s, with matching jacket and trousers in less formal fabrics and colors than business suits.
- The Power suit of the mid-1980s and early 1990s: a double-breasted suit characterized by sharp cuts, wide shoulder pads and a rigid build.

== See also ==
- Mao suit

== Bibliography ==
- Antongiavanni, Nicholas: The Suit, HarperCollins Publishers, New York, 2006. ISBN 0-06-089186-6
- Byrd, Penelope: The Male Image: men's fashion in England 1300-1970. B. T. Batsford Ltd, London, 1979. ISBN 0-7134-0860-X
- Croonborg, Frederick: The Blue Book of Men's Tailoring. Croonborg Sartorial Co., New York and Chicago, 1907
- Cunnington, C. Willett; Cunnington, Phillis (1959): Handbook of English Costume in the 19th Century, Plays Inc, Boston, 1970 reprint
- Devere, Louis: The Handbook of Practical Cutting on the Centre Crown System (London, 1866) revised and edited by R. L. Shep. R. L. Shep, Mendocino, California, 1986. ISBN 0-914046-03-9
- Doyle, Robert: The Art of the Tailor, Sartorial Press Publications, Stratford, Ontario, 2005. ISBN 0-9683039-2-7
- Druessedow, Jean L. (editor): Men's Fashion Illustration from the Turn of the Century Reprint. Originally published: New York: Jno J. Mitchell Co. 1910. Dover Publications, 1990 ISBN 0-486-26353-3
- Mansfield, Alan; Cunnington, Phillis: Handbook of English Costume in the 20th Century 1900-1950, Plays Inc, Boston, 1973
- Stephenson, Angus (editor): The Shorter Oxford Dictionary. Oxford University Press, New York, 2007
- Unknown author: The Standard Work on Cutting Men's Garments. 4th ed. Originally pub. 1886 by Jno J Mitchell, New York. ISBN 0-916896-33-1
- Vincent, W. D. F.: The Cutter's Practical Guide. Vol II "All kinds of body coats". The John Williamson Company, London, circa 1893.
- Waugh, Norah: The Cut of Men's Clothes 1600-1900, Routledge, London, 1964. ISBN 0-87830-025-2
- Whife, A. A (ed): The Modern Tailor Outfitter and Clothier. The Caxton Publishing Company Ltd, London, 1951
