= Haward =

Haward refers to

- Francis Haward (1759–1797), engraver to H.R.H. the Prince of Wales
- John Warrington Haward (1841–1921), English surgeon
- Lazarus Haward 17th-century author
- Lionel Haward (1920–1998), British clinical and forensic psychologist
- Nicolas Haward 16th-century author
