= Phillis Emily Cunnington =

English doctor and historian (1887–1974)

- Born: Phillis Emily Webb; 1 November 1887; Calcutta, India
- Died: 24 October 1974 (aged 86); York, England
- Spouse: Cecil Willett Cunnington (m. 1918; died 1961)
- Father: William Trego Webb
- Relatives: Noel Webb (brother)

Phillis Emily Cunnington (1 November 1887 – 24 October 1974) was an English medical doctor and collector, writer and historian on costume and fashion. She and her husband Cecil Willett Cunnington (1878–1961) worked together not only in their medical practice but also on their collection and writing. In 1947, the Cunningtons' extensive costume collection was acquired by the Manchester City Art Gallery and the Gallery of Costume at Platt Hall was opened.

== Early life ==
She was born as Phillis Emily Webb in 1887 in Calcutta in India, the oldest of four children born to Isabel Mary née Aldis (1864–1952) and William Trego Webb (1847–1934), an author formerly of the Bengal Education Department who collaborated with F. J. Rowe to produce a number of English grammar books for Indian students. Her youngest brother was Captain Noel William Ward Webb MC & Bar (1896–1917), a British World War I flying ace credited with fourteen aerial victories. He was the first pilot to use the Sopwith Camel to claim an enemy aircraft. He also claimed the life of German ace Leutnant Otto Brauneck for his ninth victory. Another brother was Lieutenant Paul Frederic Hobson Webb (1889–1918), who was killed in action on 7 July 1918 while serving in No. 27 Squadron RAF.

== Medicine and collecting ==
In 1911, Webb was a medical student at the London School of Medicine for Women and in 1916 a Licentiate of the Royal College of Physicians, qualifying as a doctor in 1918 and becoming a Member of the Royal College of Physicians (MRCP). For a period she was Clinical Assistant in the Eye Department of the Royal Northern Hospital, later being the Medical Officer in charge of the Infant Welfare Centre in Finchley in northwest London.

In 1918, Phillis Webb married Cecil Willett Cunnington who was also a qualified doctor and who had served as a Captain in the Royal Army Medical Corps during World War I. For a number of years the couple had a joint practice from their home Tatchley House on Dollis Avenue in Finchley. The two collected clothes and they soon had to build a large shed in the garden to house them all. By the end of the 1930s they had about a thousand costumes, some of which they loaned out for some of the first British television transmissions.

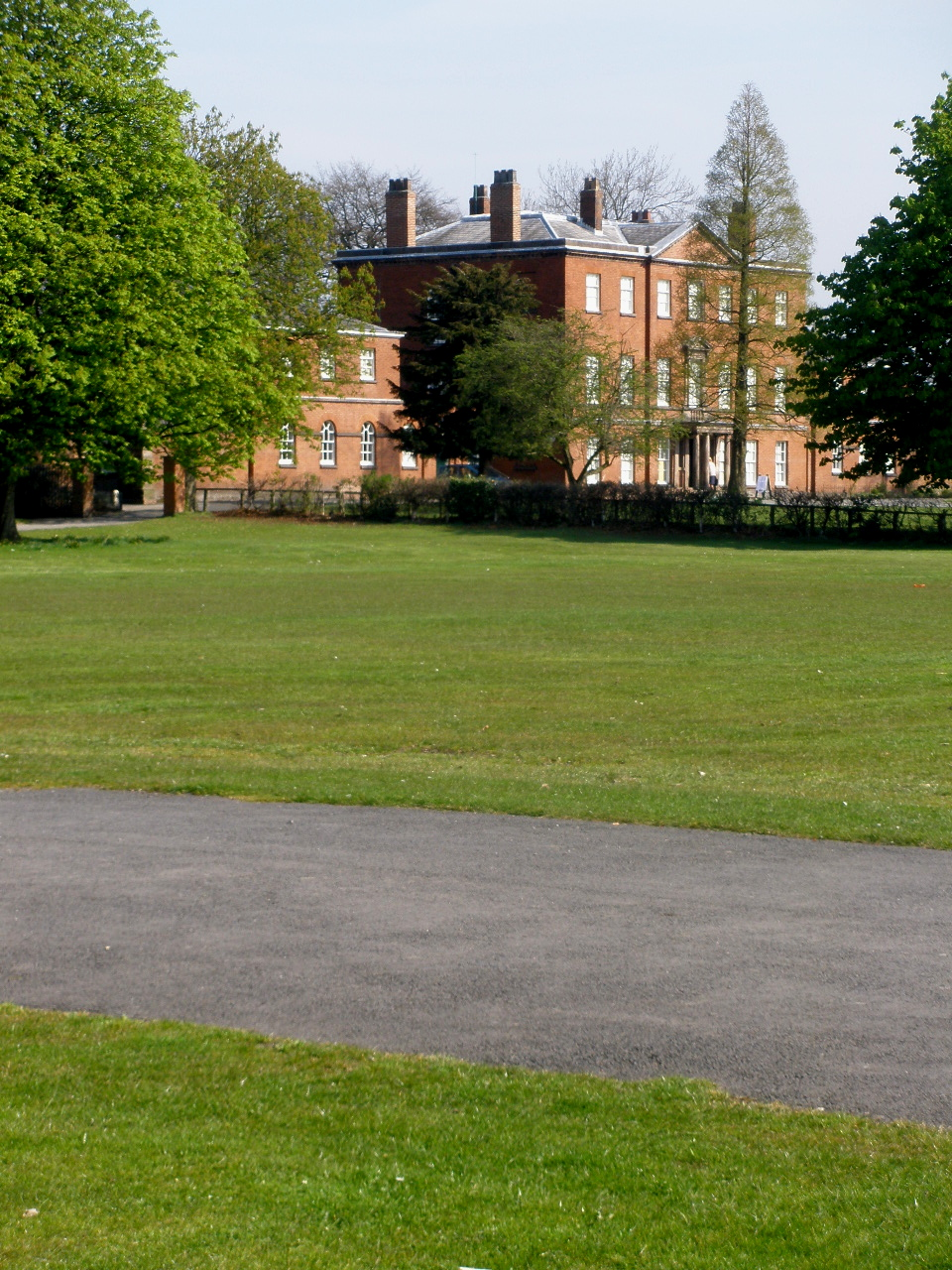
In 1947 the Cunningtons' collection was purchased and formed the nucleus of the Gallery of Costume at Platt Hall

The Cunningtons collaborated on various books including A History of Underclothes, one of only a few studies on the subject at that time. In 1945 the collection was offered for sale for £7,000 with the hope that a single benefactor would keep it together. The collection was said to contain over 900 dresses, 650 hats or bonnets, 550 items of underclothing, 100 pairs of shoes, 90 shawls, 100 parasols and 350 examples of ribbons. The collection also included 1,200 bound and 2,600 unbound publications and 15,000 photographs.

In 1945, Lawrence Haward, the Curator of the Manchester City Art Gallery, launched a campaign to raise funds for the purchase of the Cunnigtons' extensive collection. In 1947 their collection of costumes was finally acquired and the Gallery of Costume at Platt Hall was opened. Cecil Cunnington served as an Honorary Advisor to the collection.

Having moved to West Mersea in Essex the couple began a series of five handbooks that covered the history of English dress which they completed by 1959. After the death of her husband in 1961 Phillis Cunnington continued to write books on the history of costume, both alone and in collaboration with others.

Phillis Emily Cunnington died in York in Yorkshire in 1974 aged 86.

== Selected publications ==
- Cunnington, C. W., & Cunnington, P. (1951) The History of Underclothes, Courier Dover Publications.
- Cunnington, C. Willett, and Phillis Cunnington. (1952) Handbook of English Mediaeval Costume, London: Faber and Faber.
- Cunnington, Cecil Willet, and Phillis Cunnington. (1963) Handbook of English Costume in the Seventeenth Century, London: Faber.
- Cunnington, C. Willett, and Phillis Cunnington. (1966) Handbook of English Costume in the Nineteenth Century Faber & Faber.
- Cunnington, Phillis Emily, and Lucas, Catherine. (1967) Occupational Costume in England : from the Eleventh Century to 1914, Adam & Charles Black
- Cunnington, Phillis Emily, and Lucas, Catherine. Charity Costumes, Bloomsbury Publishing
- Cunnington, Phillis Emily. (1969) Costume in Pictures, Universe Books
- Cunnington, Phillis Emily. (1969) English Costume for Sports and Outdoor Recreation from the Sixteenth to the Nineteenth Centuries, A. and C. Black
- Cunnington, Phillis Emily. (1970) Costumes of the 17th and 18th Century, Plays, Inc.
- Cunnington, Phillis Emily. (1970) Costumes of the Nineteenth Century, Plays, Inc.
- Cunnington, Phillis Emily. (1972) Costume for Births, Marriages & Deaths, Barnes & Noble
- Cunnington, Phillis Emily, and Mansfield, Alan. (1973) Handbook of English Costume in the Twentieth Century, 1900-1950, Plays, Inc.
- Cunnington, Phillis Emily. (1974) Costume of Household Servants, from the Middle Ages to 1900, A and C Black
- Cunnington, Phillis Emily. (1978) Charity Costumes of Children, Scholars, Almsfolk, Pensioners, A. and C. Black
- Cunnington, Phillis Emily, and Buck, Anne. (1978) Children's Costume in England, Adam & Charles Black
