= Lawrence Haward =

Lawrence Warrington Haward by Henry Lamb

Lawrence Warrington Haward (7 August 1878 – 18 November 1957) was a noted art collector and writer who was the second Curator of the Manchester City Art Gallery (now the Manchester Art Gallery) from 1914 to 1945.

He was born in Westminster in London in 1878, the oldest son of Amy Cecilia née Nicholls (1857-1938) and John Warrington Haward (1842-1921), a surgeon. In October 1897 he was admitted to King's College, Cambridge, taking his B.A. in 1900 and gaining his M.A. in 1904. He was the Librarian at the University of London (1905-6), and was on the musical staff of The Times (1906–14).

In 1914 Haward was appointed Curator of the Manchester Art Gallery having succeeded William Stanfield, the Gallery’s first Curator. Haward was to hold the post for over 30 years until his retirement in 1945. An "influential and astute collector", under Haward's direction the Gallery went through a period of great expansion which saw five new branch galleries opening across Manchester and the collection tripling in size. In addition, Haward was able to attract important gifts and bequests to the Gallery from noted collectors in the city or from others who had connections with Manchester.

These gifts included that of James Blair who in 1917 bequeathed a collection of paintings and watercolours, including an important collection of watercolours by Turner; also in 1917 Leicester Collier left the Gallery his collection of British and European porcelain, glass, paintings and prints of Old Masters. In 1922 Mary Greg gave about 2,000 items to the Gallery including her collection of 'Handicrafts of Bygone Times' as well as her collection of dolls and dolls’ houses. In 1923 Mary Greg further gifted to the Gallery her late husband Thomas Greg's collection of pottery from the Roman period to the early 19th-century which had been on loan to the Gallery since 1904. In 1920 Dr David Lloyd Roberts bequeathed his collection of paintings, watercolours, prints, silver and glass to the Gallery, while in 1934 John Yates bequeathed his extensive collection of jades, oriental ivories, enamels, antiquities and Victorian paintings.

In addition to these gifts, Haward bought contemporary art for the Gallery while in 1925 Charles Rutherston presented his modern art collection to the Gallery so that it could set up a loan service to local art colleges. In 1929 Haward was responsible for setting up the Industrial Art Collection, a collection of modern everyday objects designed to demonstrate the principles of good design. Before his retirement in 1945 Haward also obtained important art from both World Wars, thus creating one of the most important War Art collections outside London. Haward was a Trustee of the National Loan Collection Trust (1918–44) and was awarded the Honorary Degree of Master of Arts from the University of Manchester. In 1945 he launched a campaign to raise funds for the purchase of the extensive collection of husband and wife Cecil Willett Cunnington and Phillis Emily Cunnington. In 1947 their collection of costumes was acquired and the Gallery of Costume at Platt Hall was opened. Cecil Cunnington served as an Honorary Advisor to the collection.

On his retirement Haward moved to Switzerland. He died in November 1957 at the Evelyn Nursing Home in Cambridge and was cremated in that city.

== Selected publications ==
- Haward, Lawrence. (1956). Edward J. Dent: a bibliography. Cambridge University Press College.
- Haward, Lawrence. (1948). Music in painting. New York: Pitman Pub. Corp.
- Haward, Lawrence. (1938). Illustrated guide to the art collections in the Manchester corporation galleries. Manchester Art Galleries Committee, UK
- Haward, Lawrence. (1916). The effect of war upon art and literature; a lecture delivered at the University of Manchester, February 28, Manchester: University Press
