= Balinci =

Balinci may refer to:

- Balinci, North Macedonia, a village near Valandovo
- Balinci, Croatia, a village near Mikleuš
