= Frederick Rowe =

Frederick Rowe may refer to:

- Frederick W. Rowe (1863–1946), U.S. Representative from New York
- Frederick William Rowe (1912–1994), Canadian politician and Senator
- Frederick B. Rowe (born 1937), Canadian politician
- F. J. Rowe (1844–1909), professor of English literature
