= William Trego Webb =

British educationist and author

William Trego Webb (24 August 1847 – 8 January 1934) was a British educationist and author who taught English Literature in various colleges in Bengal in India in the late 19th and early 20th centuries. A prolific writer, he also produced a number of English language grammar books for Indian students with fellow-academic F. J. Rowe.

William Trego Webb was born in Ipswich in 1847, the eldest son of Frances Webb (1809–1883) and the Rev. James Webb (1803–1881), a Baptist minister of Stoke Green in Ipswich. He attended Ipswich School and matriculated at Gonville and Caius College, Cambridge on 26 March 1866, taking his BA in 1870 and gaining his MA in 1874. He was an Assistant Master at La Martiniere College in Calcutta from 1870 to 1875. He entered the Indian Education Service in Bengal in 1875, and was Professor of English Literature at Dacca College from 1875 to 1878. Webb was Professor of English Literature at the Presidency College in Calcutta from 1878 to 1892. While working for the Bengal Education Department Webb collaborated with F. J. Rowe to produce a number of English grammar books for Indian students.

Webb married Isabel Mary née Aldis (1864–1952) on 27 September 1886 at St. George's church in Walsall in Stafford. They had eight children born between 1887 and 1901: Phillis, Paul, Hope, Alice, Roy, Noel William (Billy), Molly and Josephine. Captain Noel William Ward Webb MC & Bar (1896–1917), a British World War I flying ace was credited with fourteen aerial victories. The first pilot to use the Sopwith Camel to claim an enemy aircraft, he also claimed the life of German ace Leutnant Otto Brauneck for his ninth victory. Another son was Lieutenant Paul Frederic Hobson Webb (1889–1918), who was killed in action on 7 July 1918 while serving in No. 27 Squadron RAF. His daughter Phillis Emily Cunnington was a physician, costume collector, historian and author.

William Trego Webb died in January 1934 in his cottage The Nothe at West Mersea in Essex. In his will he left £30,724 15s to his widow Isabel Mary Webb.

== Publications ==
- Hints on the Study of English – with F. J. Rowe (Calcutta : Thacker, Spink and Co., 1874)
- Select Epigrams from Martial for English Readers (Trans.) (London : Macmillan, 1879)
- Indian Lyrics and Other Verses (Thacker, Calcutta, 1884)
- Selections from Tennyson – with F. J. Rowe (Ed.) (London : Macmillan & Co, 1888)
- English Etiquette, For Indian Gentlemen (Calcutta: S. K. Lahiri and Co., 1890)
- Essays Written in the Intervals of Business, (London, New York, Macmillan and Co., 1890)
- Enoch Arden (Ed.) (London : Macmillan & Co, 1891)
- Aylmer's Field – with F. J. Rowe (London : Macmillan and Co, 1891)
- The Coming of Arthur and The Passing of Arthur. With introductions and notes (London, New York, Macmillan and Co., 1891)
- Selections from Cowper's letters (Ed.) (London; New York : Macmillan, 1895)
- Cowper's Shorter Poems (London : Macmillan & Co, 1896)
- Four Children : In Prose and Verse (London; New York : Macmillan, 1896)
- Selections from Wordsworth (Macmillan & Co : London, 1897)
- Macaulay's Lays of Ancient Rome (Ed) (London : Macmillan & Co, 1897)
- An Introductory English Grammar, in English and Bengali: with Numerous Exercises – with F. J. Rowe (Calcutta : S.K. Lahiri, 1901)
- Selections from Campbell (Ed.) (London : Macmillan & Co, 1902)
- A Book of Bad Children (verse) (London : Methuen & Co, 1903)
- A Handbook of English Literature – with J. A. Aldis (Calcutta : S.K. Lahiri, 1912)
- By Siloa's Brook; or, Songs of the Faith (London : Headley Bros, 1913)
- English Poetry for Young Students. Selected and edited, with notes (London : Macmillan & Co, 1915)
- Stories in Verse. With Introduction, Paraphrases, Substance-Writing, Questions, and Notes – with J. A. Aldis (Calcutta, 1917)
- How to Write an Essay,: With Sample Essays and Subjects for Essays (London : G. Routledge & Sons, Limited; New York, E.P. Dutton & Co., 1920)
- English of To-day (London : G. Routledge & Sons; New York : E. P. Dutton & Co, 1925)
