= John Warrington Haward =

English surgeon (1841–1921)

J. Warrington Haward FRCS (13 November 1841 – 20 August 1921) was an English surgeon, noteworthy as the last President of the Royal Medical and Chirurgical Society of London before it became expanded into the Royal Society of Medicine.

The youngest surviving son in a family with ten children, J. Warrington Haward was the grand-nephew of the engraver Francis Haward. In October 1860 Warrington Haward entered the medical school of St George's Hospital and in 1863 became M.R.C.S. and L.R.C.P. He was house surgeon in 1864 at the Westminster Hospital and in 1865–1866 at the Hospital for Sick Children in Great Ormond Street. At St George's Hospital he was from 1867 demonstrator of anatomy, then in 1870–1872 surgical registrar, in 1873–1875 demonstrator of morbid anatomy (and curator of the associated museum), in 1875–1880 assistant surgeon and surgeon to the orthopædic department, and in 1880–1900 full surgeon to the orthopedic department. In 1878–1880 he was Visiting Surgeon to Atkinson Morley's Convalescent Hospital in succession to Pick. In 1868 he was made F.R.C.S. and for more than thirty years gave active service to many charities and committees. He was the President of the Royal Medical and Chirurgical Society in 1906–1907 and the president of the Surgical Section of the Royal Society of Medicine in 1908–1909.

In 1876 he married Amy Cecilia, daughter of James Nicholls, M.D., F.R.C.S. The marriage produced two sons, Lawrence Warrington Haward and Tristram Warrington Haward.

J. Warrington Haward belonged to the Athenaeum Club.

== Selected publications ==
- Haward, J. Warrington (1867). "On Croup and Diphtheria". St. George's Hospital Reports. ume II for the year 1867: 169–186.
- Phlebitis and thrombosis; the Hunterian lectures delivered before the Royal college of surgeons of England in March, 1906.
- "Address of J. Warrington Haward President at the Annual Meeting, March 1st, 1907". Med Chir Trans. 90: xcviii–cvi. 1907. PMC 2038534.
