= Holy Trinity Platt Church =

Coordinates: 53.4501°N 2.2255°W

- Holy Trinity Church, Rusholme
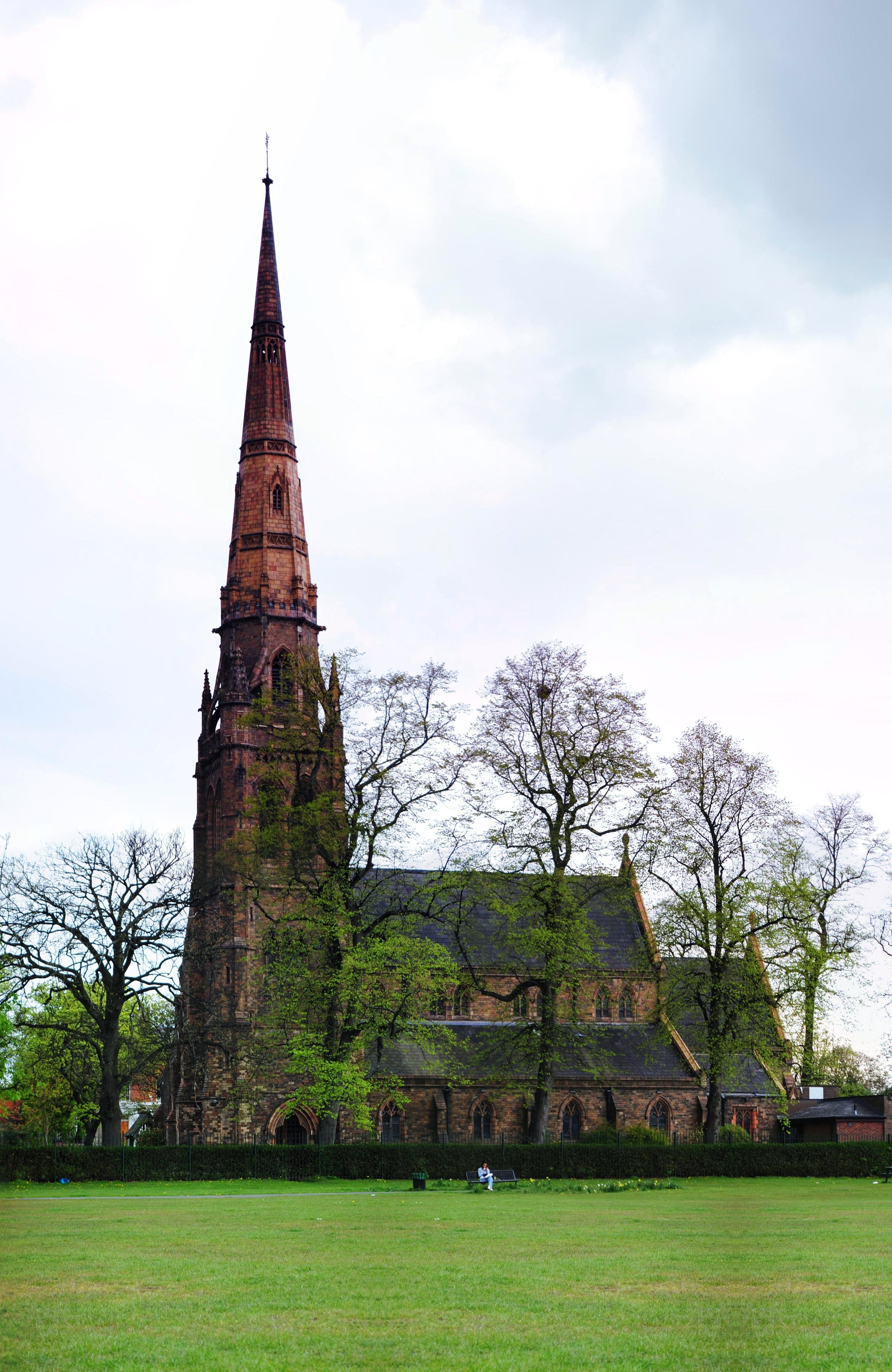
- Holy Trinity Platt Church from the south

- Location in Greater Manchester
- OS grid reference: SJ 851,948
- Location: Platt Lane, Rusholme, Manchester
- Country: England
- Denomination: Anglican
- Churchmanship: Evangelical
- Website: www.plattchurch.org

History
- Status: Parish church
- Dedication: Holy Trinity
- Consecrated: 26 June 1846

Architecture
- Functional status: Active
- Heritage designation: Grade II*
- Designated: 18 December 1963
- Architect: Edmund Sharpe
- Architectural type: Church
- Style: Gothic Revival
- Groundbreaking: 1845
- Completed: 1912

Specifications
- Materials: Terracotta, slate roof

Administration
- Province: York
- Diocese: Manchester
- Archdeaconry: Manchester
- Deanery: Hulme
- Parish: Holy Trinity at Rusholme

Clergy
- Rector: Rev Dr Paul Mathole

Holy Trinity Platt Church (also known as Holy Trinity Church, Rusholme), is in Platt Fields Park in Rusholme, Manchester, England. It is an active Anglican parish church in the deanery of Hulme, the archdeaconry of Manchester, and the diocese of Manchester. The church is recorded in the National Heritage List for England as a designated Grade II* listed building. It is the second "pot church" designed by Edmund Sharpe, so-called because the main building material used in the construction of the church is terracotta.

== History ==
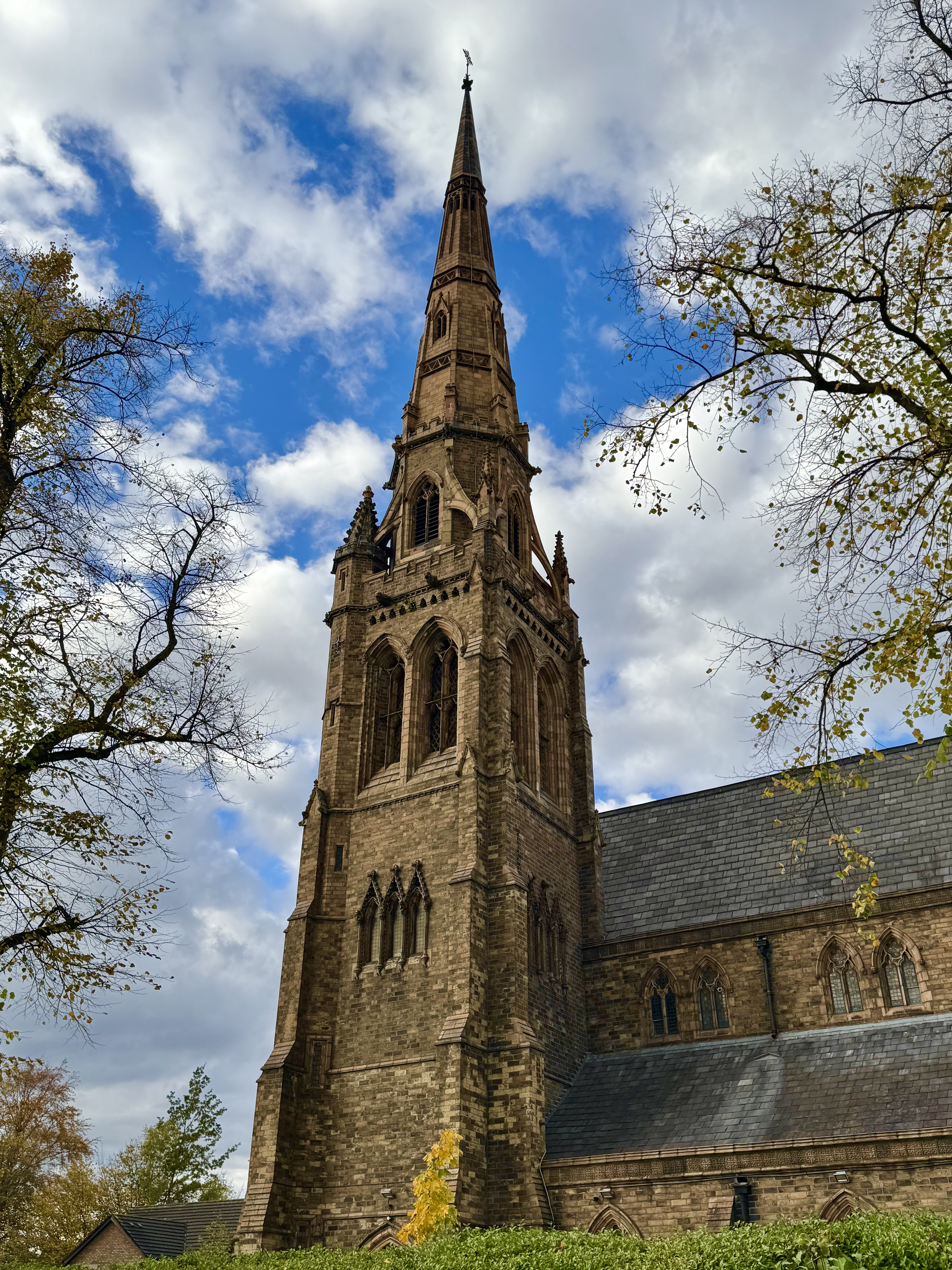
Close-up of the tower and spire of Holy Trinity Platt Church.

The church was built in 1845–46 to a design by the Lancaster architect Edmund Sharpe. It was built for Thomas Carrill Worsley of Platt Hall. The Worsley family chapel had been Platt Chapel, but this had become a Unitarian chapel early in the 19th century. Thomas Worsley planned to build an Anglican church, but in this he was in competition with a neighbour, a Mr Anson of Birch Hall, to build the first Anglican church in the area. Anson built St James' Church in Danes Road, Rusholme, but Worsley arranged for Holy Trinity to be consecrated before its building was complete. Worsley chose the dedication to the Holy Trinity to show his opposition to the Unitarians. The church cost £4,000 (equivalent to £400,000 in 2025) (excluding the stained glass), and when built it could accommodate between 650 and 700 people.

Sharpe's first "pot church" had been St Stephen and All Martyrs' Church, Lever Bridge. The terracotta for the body of this church was supplied, as before, by the Ladyshore Coal and TerraCotta Company, which was owned by Sharpe's brother-in-law, John Fletcher. However, there was a dispute with Fletcher about the costs; Fletcher supplied the terracotta for the body of the church, but the material for the spire was provided by a different manufacturer, Fletcher's brother-in-law, Edmund Peel Willock. The church was consecrated on 26 June 1846 by Rt Revd John Bird Sumner, Bishop of Chester, although the spire was not completed until 1850. The terracotta for the spire proved to be inferior to Fletcher's material, and the spire had to be replaced in 1912. In 1966–67 a church hall was built and attached to the east wall of the church.

== Architecture ==
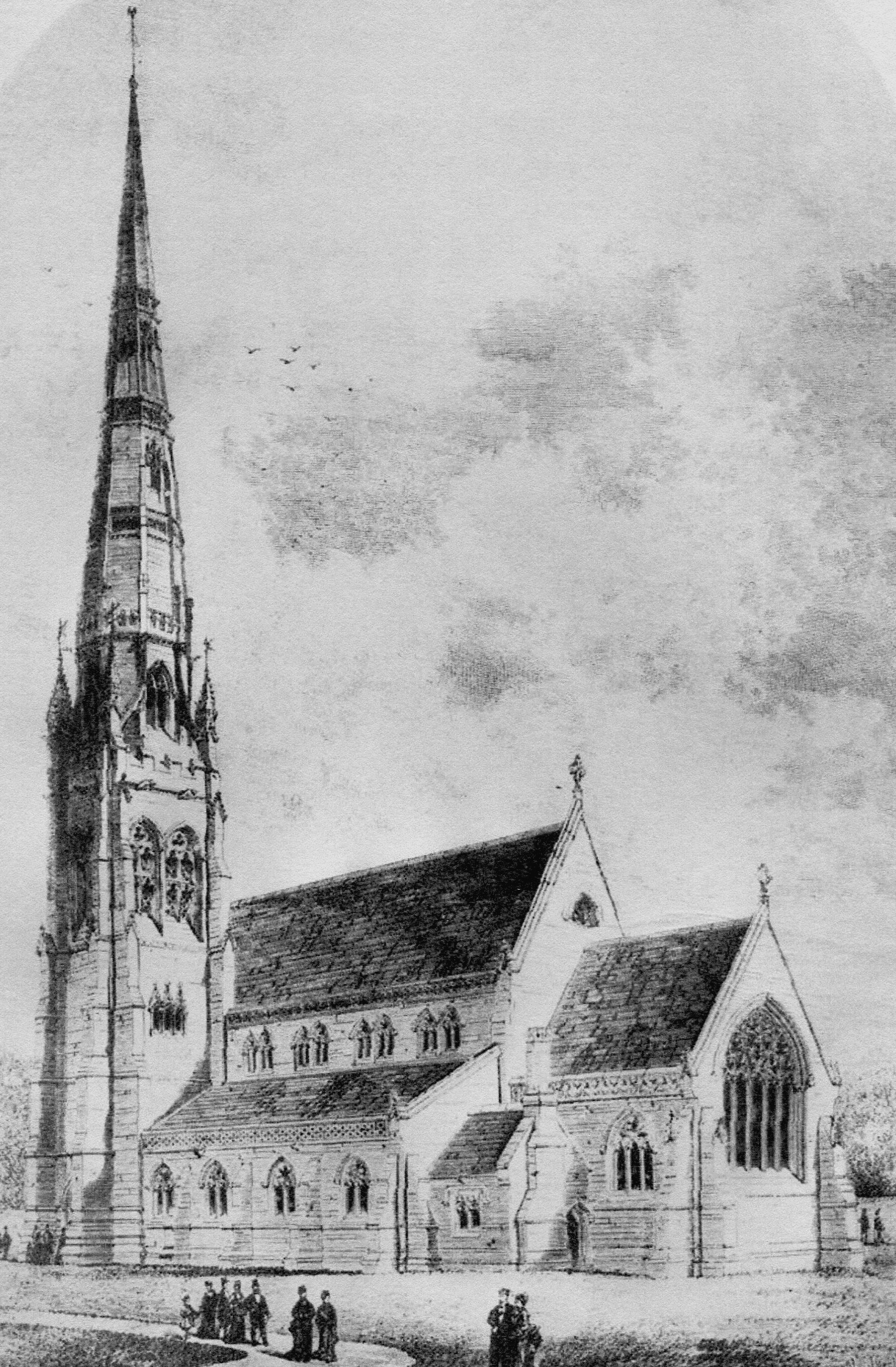
A sketch published in The Builder, 1845

=== Exterior ===
Terracotta is used as the facing material for both the interior and the exterior of the church. It is made to imitate stone, even to the use of masons' marks. The roof is in slate. The architectural style of the church is Decorated. Its plan consists of a five-bay nave with a clerestory, a southwest steeple, north and south aisles, a two-bay chancel, a west porch, and a south porch contained in the tower. The tower is in three stages with angle buttresses and it has a south doorway. Its middle stage contains three-light windows with crocketted gables, above which are paired bell openings. The summit of the tower has an embattled parapet and corner pinnacles. On the tower is a tall octagonal spire supported by flying buttresses. The west window of the church has four lights, and the east window has five lights containing elaborate tracery.

=== Interior ===
Internally, terracotta is used even for the piers of the arcades. The font is in stone and has an octagonal bowl. The stained glass in the chancel forms a memorial to the Worsley family and dates from 1849 to 1850. In the north aisle is a window dated 1871 with glass made by Lavers, Barraud and Westlake.

== See also ==
- List of architectural works by Edmund Sharpe
- Grade II* listed buildings in Greater Manchester
- Listed buildings in Manchester-M14
