= Noel Webb (RFC officer) =

Noel William Ward Webb
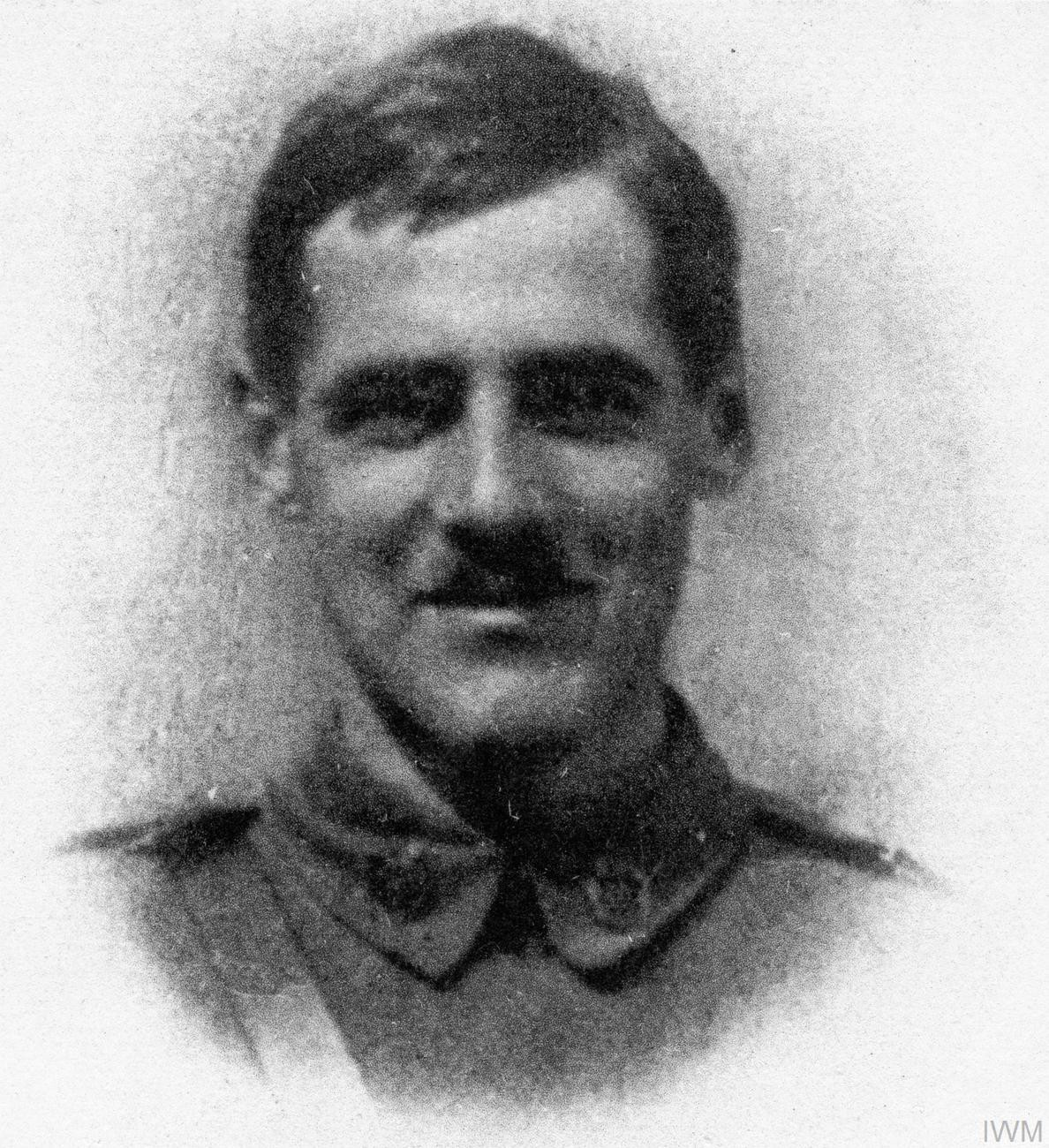
- Noel William Ward Webb
- Born: 12 December 1896; Margate, Kent, England
- Died: 16 August 1917 (aged 20) (KIA); Vicinity of Polygon Wood, France
- Burial place: Arras Flying Services Memorial, Pas de Calais, France
- Military career
- Allegiance: United Kingdom
- Branch: British Army
- Service years: 1915–1917
- Rank: Captain
- Units: Honourable Artillery Company; No. 25 Squadron RFC; No. 70 Squadron RFC
- Conflicts: World War I • Western Front
- Awards: Military Cross & Bar

Captain Noel William Ward Webb MC & Bar (12 December 1896 – 16 August 1917) was a British World War I flying ace credited with fourteen aerial victories. He also claimed the life of German ace Leutnant Otto Brauneck for his ninth victory.

== Early life and education ==
Noel William Webb (the form of name he used) was the youngest son of William Trego Webb and his wife Isabel Mary, of Kensington, London. He was educated at St. Paul's School, where he played for the first Rugby team. His older sister was the physician, costume collector and author Phillis Emily Cunnington.

== Military service ==
Webb first served as a private in the Honourable Artillery Company before being commissioned into the Royal Flying Corps as a second lieutenant on 10 March 1916. After completing pilot's training he was appointed a flying officer on 3 July 1916, and was assigned to No. 25 Squadron in France on 4 July. Piloting a Royal Aircraft Factory F.E.2b, he shot down one of the first fighters with a synchronized gun when he destroyed a Fokker Eindekker on 19 July. During the next two months, he became one of the few F.E.2 aces after four further victories, with his fifth, on 15 September, being the destruction of another Eindekker. Leslie Court was one of his observer gunners during these missions. Webb was invalided home in September, where he was appointed a flight commander with the temporary rank of captain on 4 October, and then posted to a squadron in England, where he acted as instructor, and for a time as a squadron commander. He was also awarded the Military Cross on 1 January 1917.

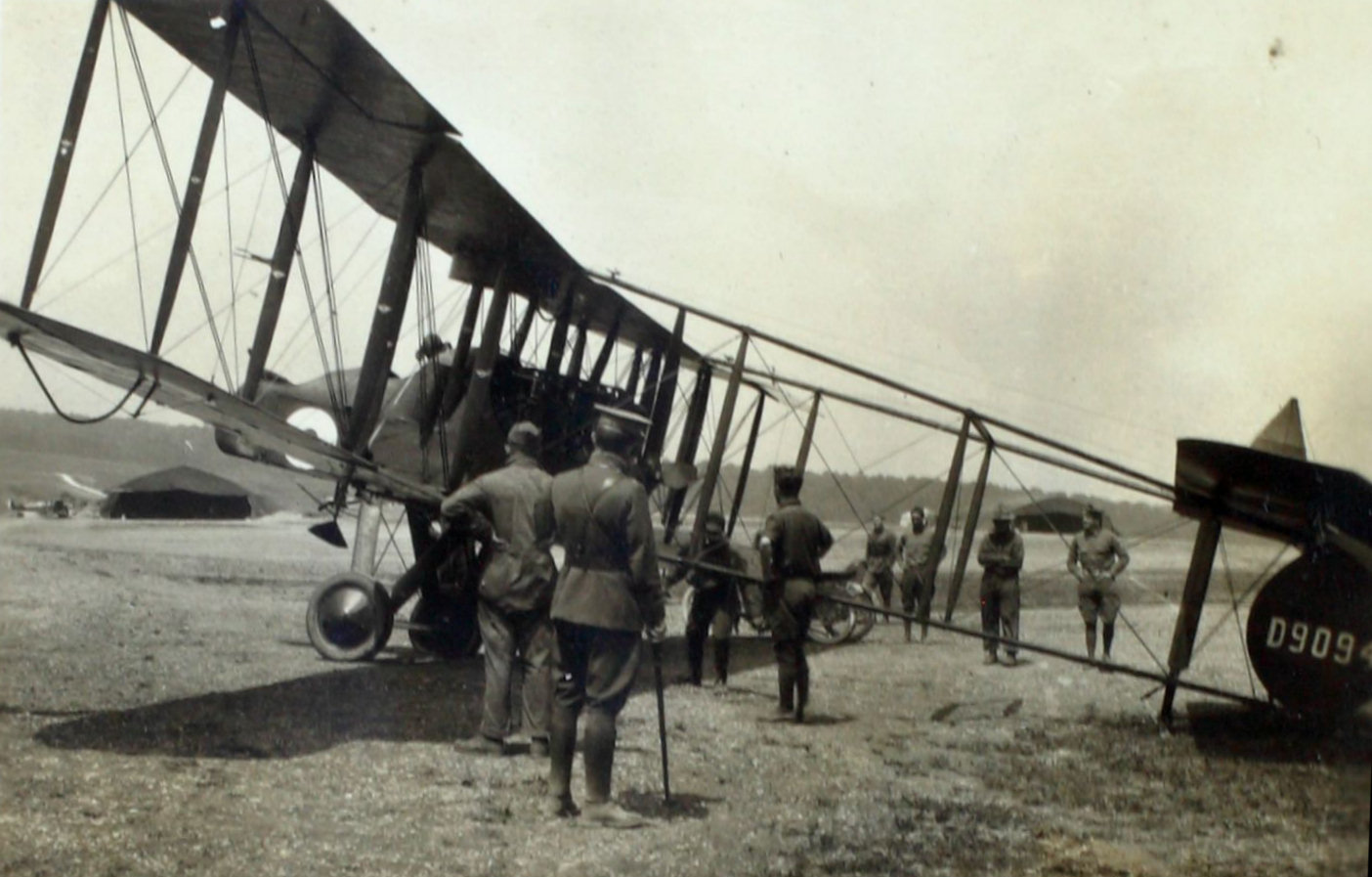
Webb was one of the few pilots who became an ace while flying the F.E.2b.

Webb was then reassigned to No. 70 Squadron as a Sopwith Camel pilot on 21 June 1917 for his return to combat. While test flying a new Camel on 12 July, he became the first pilot to score a victory in the type by wounding the crew of a German two-seater and forcing them down onto a British airfield into captivity. On 17 July, he sent down two Albatros D.Vs out of control in separate actions; in one of these dogfights, he wounded German ace Oberflugmeister Karl Meyer. On 26 July, he killed Leutnant Otto Brauneck while destroying his Albatros D.V. Webb scored twice more on the 28th, and followed this with three more, his last victories, on 13 August 1917. Three days later, near Polygon Wood, he was last seen diving away from his patrol after two German aircraft. He fell under the guns of Werner Voss.

As a Commonwealth flier of the Western Front with no known grave he is commemorated at the Arras Flying Services Memorial, and also, alongside his brother Lieutenant Paul Frederic Hobson Webb, who was killed in action on 7 July 1918 while serving in No. 27 Squadron RAF, on the War Memorial at Dunwich, Suffolk.

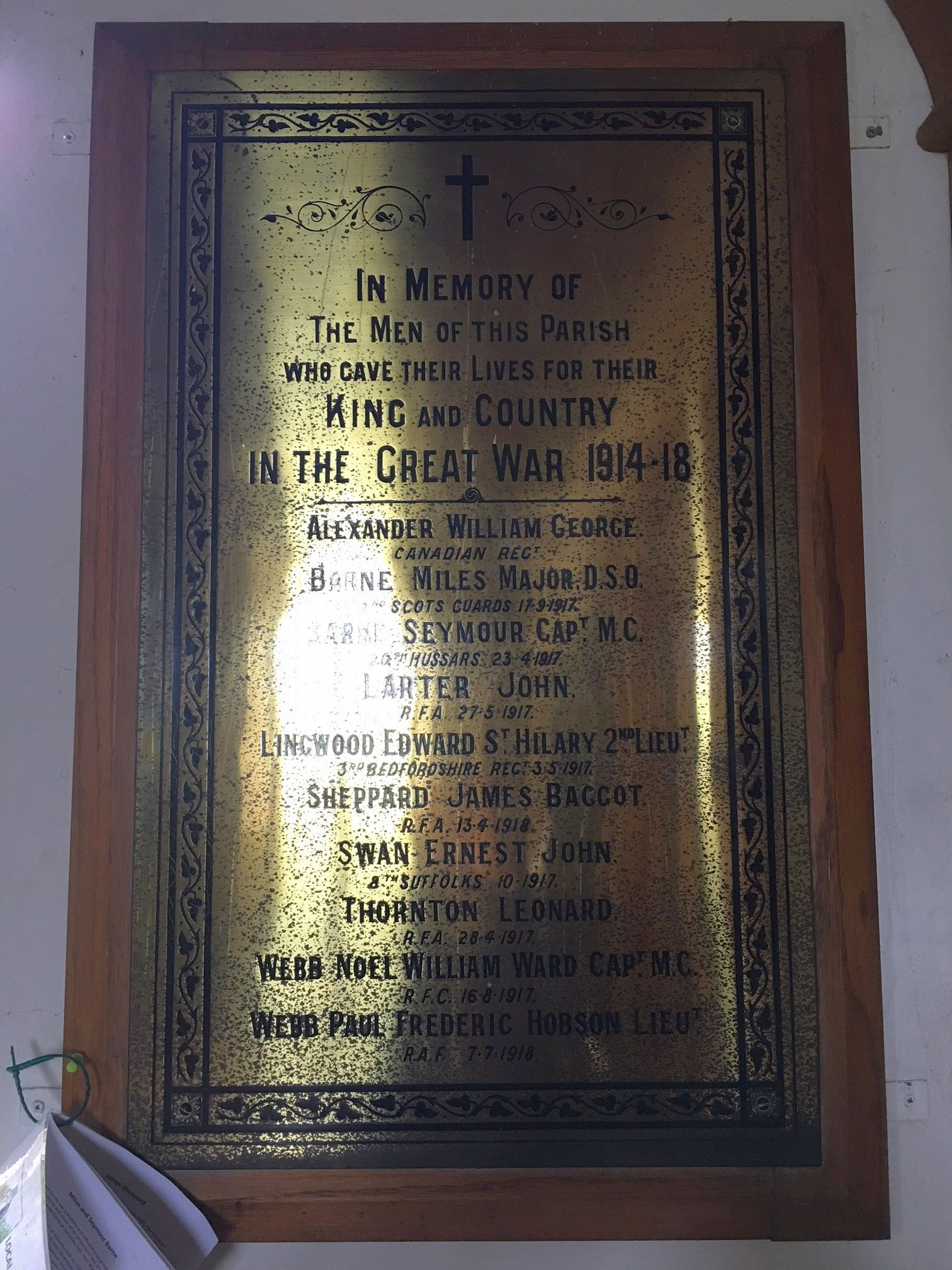
War memorial inside St James's Church in Dunwich including Noel Webb

== List of aerial victories ==
Combat record
No.	Date/Time	Aircraft/ Serial No.	Opponent	Result	Location	Notes
No. 25 Squadron RFC
1	19 July 1916 @ 0645	F.E.2b (5245)	Fokker E	Destroyed	East of Provin	Observer: Second Lieutenant I. A. Mann.
2	9 August 1916 @ 1215	F.E.2b (4839)	Albatros C	Forced to land	Beaumont	Observer: Lieutenant C. S. Workman.
3	7 September 1916 @ 1750	F.E.2b (7003)	Fokker E	Out of control	Pont-à-Vendin	Observer: Corporal H. Brown. Shared with Captains Alwyne Loyd & C. H. Dixon, Second Lieutenant C. S. Workman, and Air Mechanic M. J. H. Booth.
4	9 September 1916 @ 1600	F.E.2b (6993)	C	Destroyed	Pont-à-Vendin	Observer: Sergeant Leslie Court.
5	15 September 1916 @ 1720	F.E.2b (4841)	Fokker E	Destroyed	Fresnoy	Observer: Lieutenant C. S. Workman.
No. 70 Squadron RFC
6	12 July 1917 @ 1215	Sopwith Camel (B3756)	Albatros C.X	Captured	Bellevue	From Flieger-Abteilung 18. Pilot: Leutnant Johannes Böhm (DOW). Observer: Leutnant Johannes Wollenhaupt (POW).
7	17 July 1917 @ 2000–2055	Sopwith Camel (B3756)	Albatros D.V	Out of control	South of Gheluvelt	
8	17 July 1917 @ 2000–2055	Sopwith Camel (B3756)	Albatros D.V	Out of control	South of Gheluvelt	
9	26 July 1917 @ 1930	Sopwith Camel (B3756)	Albatros D.V	Destroyed	East of Zonnebeke	Leutnant Otto Brauneck (KIA).
10	28 July 1917 @ 1940–1950	Sopwith Camel (B3756)	Albatros D.III	Destroyed	Roulers	
11	28 July 1917 @ 1940–1950	Sopwith Camel (B3756)	Albatros D.III	Out of control	East of Polygon Wood	
12	13 August 1917 @ 1930–1945	Sopwith Camel (B3756)	DFW C	Out of control	North-east of Diksmuide	
13	13 August 1917 @ 1930–1945	Sopwith Camel (B3756)	DFW C	Destroyed	East of Diksmuide	
14	13 August 1917 @ 1930–1945	Sopwith Camel (B3756)	DFW C	Out of control	North-east of Diksmuide	Shared with Captain A. R. Hudson.

== Honours and awards ==
Military Cross

Gazetted on 1 January 1917, without citation.

Bar to Military Cross
Temporary Captain Noel William Webb, MC, General List and Royal Flying Corps.

"For conspicuous gallantry and devotion to duty in aerial combats. He has destroyed three hostile machines and driven down four others completely out of control. By his spirit and gallantry he has set a fine example which has inspired the pilots of his flight to successfully attack enemy formations many times more numerous than their own."
