= Nuffield Health Cambridge Hospital =

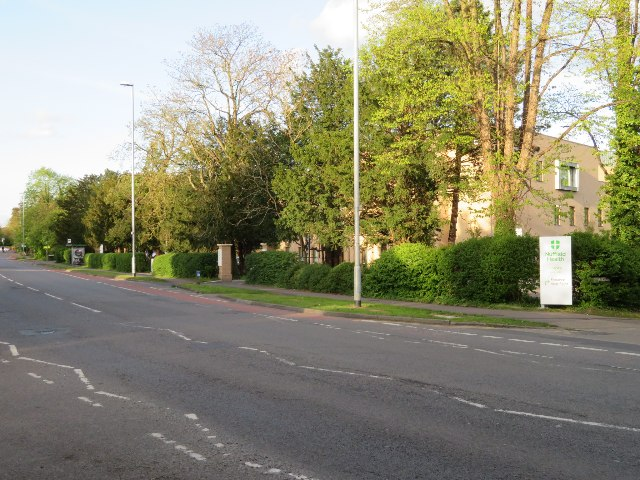
- Nuffield Health Cambridge Hospital

- Shown in Cambridgeshire

Geography
- Location: Cambridge, Cambridgeshire, England
- Coordinates: 52.19014°N 0.12406°E

Organisation
- Care system: Private

History
- Founded: 1921

Links
- Lists: Hospitals in England

Nuffield Health Cambridge Hospital is a private hospital in Cambridge, England.

== History ==
The facility was founded by C Morland Agnew as the Evelyn Nursing Home in 1921. Agnew was motivated to establish the nursing home after his wife, Evelyn, had been poorly treated in another nursing home. Following a programme of modernisation initiated by Agnew's grandson, Julian, in 1974, which allowed the facility to specialise in acute medical and surgical cases, it was renamed the Evelyn Hospital in 1983. After the site was acquired by Nuffield Health in 2003, a new extension, built at a cost of £30 million, was opened in July 2015.

== Services ==
In 2016 it was the first hospital ever to be classed overall as "outstanding" by the Care Quality Commission.

== Notable residents ==
- W. H. R. Rivers, anthropologist, neurologist and psychologist, died at the Evelyn Nursing Home in 1922
- A. E. Housman, poet and classicist, died at the Evelyn Nursing Home in 1936
- Arthur Eddington, astrophysicist and mathematician, died at the Evelyn Nursing Home in 1944
- Hector Munro Chadwick, philologist, died at the Evelyn Nursing Home in 1947
- Lawrence Haward, art collector and writer, died at the Evelyn Nursing Home in 1957
- G. E. Moore, philosopher, died at the Evelyn Nursing Home in 1958
