= Otto Brauneck =

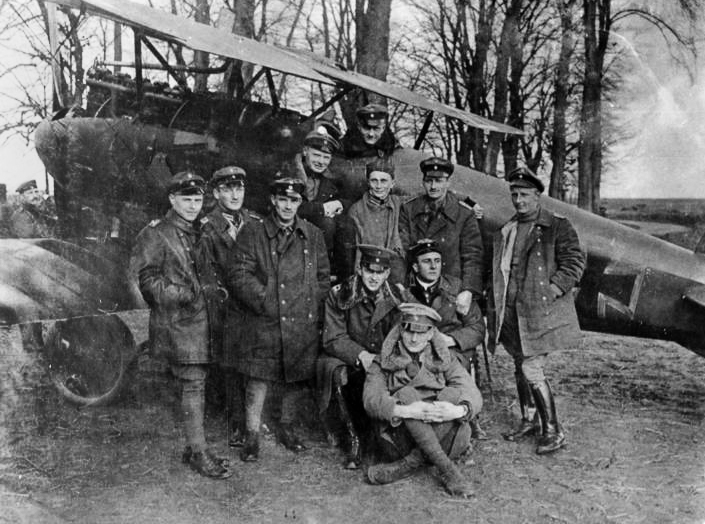
- Otto with Manfred Von Richthofen
- Born: 27 February 1896; Sulzbach
- Died: 26 July 1917 (aged 21)
- Military career
- Allegiance: German Empire
- Branch: Luftstreitkräfte
- Rank: Leutnant (Second Lieutenant)
- Units: Feldflieger Abteilung 69; Jagdstaffel 25; Jagdstaffel 11
- Awards: Royal House Order of Hohenzollern; Iron Cross First and Second Class

Leutnant Otto Brauneck (27 February 1896 – 26 July 1917) was a German World War I flying ace credited with ten confirmed and five unconfirmed aerial victories. Originally assigned to fly on the Macedonian Front to support Germany's ally, the Ottoman Empire, between September 1916 and April 1917 Brauneck shot down four enemy observation balloons and three aircraft, with a further five claims going unproven. Transferred to the Red Baron's Jagdstaffel 11 in France, Brauneck scored a further three victories before being killed in action on 26 July 1917.

== Early life ==
Otto Brauneck was born on 27 February 1896 in Sulzbach, the German Empire.

== Aerial service ==
=== In Macedonia ===
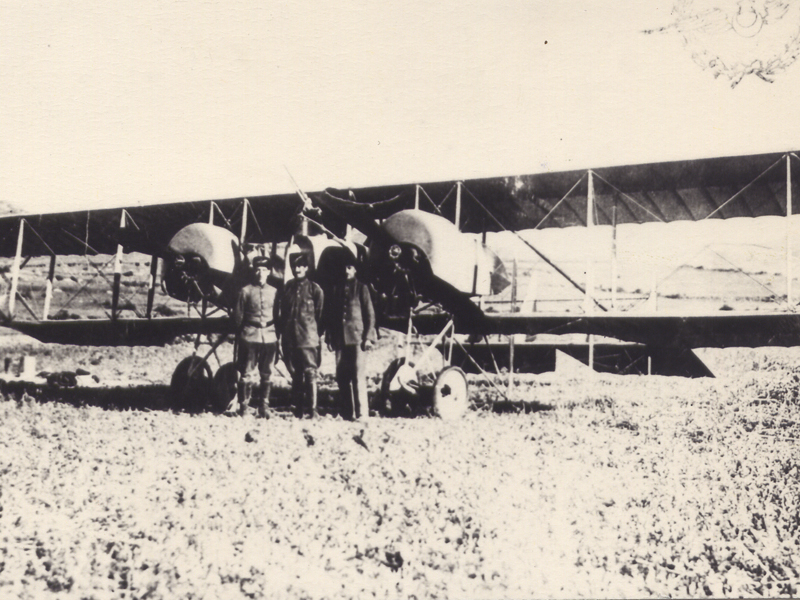
A Caudron G.4 of the Ottoman Air Force; a Caudron G.4 was Brauneck's fifth confirmed victory in Macedonia.

Brauneck joined the air service and was posted to FFA 69 in Macedonia. He scored first in September 1916. His second victory, over an observation balloon on 14 December, earned him the Iron Cross First Class. After an unconfirmed victory on Christmas Day, he shot down two balloons on 5 January 1917. He then transferred to Jagdstaffel 25 on 14 January 1917. On 19 January, he received the Knight's Cross of the Royal House Order of Hohenzollern. Between 19 January and 6 April 1917, he claimed seven triumphs, only three of which were confirmed.

==== Victories in Macedonia ====
"U/C" marks an unconfirmed victory.

No.	Date/time	Unit	Foe	Location	Notes
1	September 1916	FFA 69	Biplane	Bitola, vicinity of Manastir	
2	14 December 1916	FFA 69	Observation balloon	Vicinity of Monastir	
U/C	25 December 1916	FFA 69	Enemy aircraft		Foe forced to land
3	5 January 1917	FFA 69	Observation balloon	Vicinity of Negočani	
4	5 January 1917	FFA 69	Observation balloon	Cernabogen	
5	19 January 1917	Jagdstaffel 25	Caudron G.IV	North of Gjevgjeli	
U/C	20 January 1917	Jasta 25	Farman	Southwest of Doiran Lake	
U/C	20 January 1917	Jasta 25	Enemy aircraft	Southwest of Doiran Lake	
6	11 February 1917 @ 1200 hours	Jasta 25	Armstrong Whitworth F.K.8	South of Hudova, vicinity of Balince	Victim was from No. 47 Squadron RFC
U/C	1 March 1917	Jasta 25	Enemy aircraft		
7	31 March 1917	Jasta 25	Observation balloon	Cernabogen, south of Monastir	Victim was from 27th Kite Balloon Squadron
U/C	6 April 1917	Jasta 25	Observation balloon		

=== In France ===
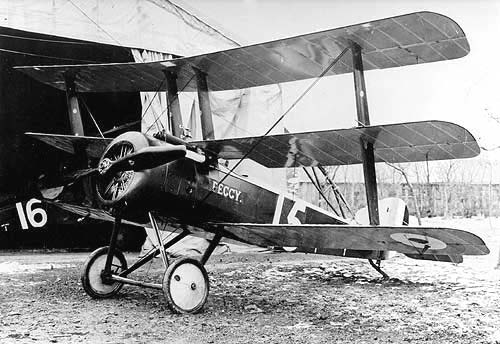
Braunecker's final victim flew a Sopwith Triplane.

On 20 April 1917, he moved to Jasta 11 on the Western Front, to serve under Manfred von Richthofen. He scored twice in early June. On 22 July 1917, he shot down a 10 Naval Squadron Sopwith Triplane, probably Canadian seven-victory ace Flight Lieutenant John Albert Page. On 26 July 1917, Brauneck fell to the guns of 70 Squadron's Captain Noel Webb.

==== Victories in France ====
No.	Date/time	Unit	Foe	Location	Notes
8	1 June 1917 @ 1158 hours	Jagdstaffel 11	Royal Aircraft Factory RE.8	Méricourt, France	Victim from No. 16 Squadron RFC
9	5 June 1917 1120 hours	Jasta 11	Sopwith 1 1/2 Strutter	Terhand	Victim from No. 45 Squadron RFC
10	22 July 1917 @ 1125 hours	Jasta 11	Sopwith Triplane N5478	Becelaere	Victim from No. 10 Squadron RNAS

== Decorations and awards ==
- Knight's Cross of the Royal House Order of Hohenzollern (19 January 1917)
- Iron Cross of 1914, 1st and 2nd class
