= Cecil Willett Cunnington =

English physician and costume historian (1878–1961)

- Cecil Willett Cunnington in 1935
- Born: 22 November 1878; Devizes, Wiltshire, England
- Died: 21 January 1961 (aged 82); West Mersea, Essex, England
- Occupation: Medical doctor
- Known for: Fashion and costume historian

Cecil Willett Cunnington (22 November 1878 – 21 January 1961) was an English medical doctor and collector, writer and historian on costume and fashion. When he died The Times called him the Leading Authority on English Costume. He and his wife Phillis Emily Cunnington (1887–1974) worked together not only in their medical practice but also on their collection and writing. In 1947 the Cunningtons' extensive costume collection was acquired by the Manchester City Art Gallery and the Gallery of Costume at Platt Hall was opened.

== Early life ==
Cunnington was born in 1878 in Devizes, Wiltshire, the son of Annette Wright née Leach (1848–1919) and Henry Alfred Cunnington (1850–1879), a wine merchant, and was educated at Clifton College and Cambridge. He later moved to St Bartholomew's Hospital to train as a Physician.

== War and marriage ==
During World War I Cunnington served as a captain in the Royal Army Medical Corps. In 1918 he married Phillis Webb who was also a qualified doctor and for a number of years they had a joint practice in Finchley.

== Costume and fashion ==
Cunnington and his wife collected clothes, and they soon had to build a large shed in the garden to house them all. By the end of the 1930s, they had about a thousand costumes, some of which they loaned out for some of the first British television transmissions.

Using his collection as a source, Cunnington published his first work, English Women's Clothing in the Nineteenth Century, in 1937. Although his second major work English Women's Clothing in the Present Century did not follow for 15 years he wrote a number of smaller works on the social implications and psychology of fashion. In collaboration with his wife he produced, A History of Underclothes, one of only a few studies on the subject at that time.

When they retired, they sold the collection to the Manchester Art Gallery for display at the Gallery of Costume at Platt Hall. Having moved to West Mersea, Essex the couple began a series of five handbooks that covered the history of English dress which they completed by 1959.

Cunnington died at his home at West Mersea on 21 January 1961 aged 82.

== Museum of Clothes ==
In a letter to The Times in November 1937 Cunnington suggested a national costume museum. He also suggested that he would donate his collection to the nation if such a museum was established, if a museum was not established he would offer his collection for sale as he wanted it to remain together rather than being, as he said, "scattered here and there in existing museums".

In 1945 the collection was offered for sale for £7,000 with the hope that a single benefactor would keep it together. The collection was said to contain over 900 dresses, 650 hats or bonnets, 550 items of underclothing, 100 pairs of shoes, 90 shawls, 100 parasols and 350 examples of ribbons. The collection also included 1,200 bound and 2,600 unbound publications and 15,000 photographs.

In 1945 Lawrence Haward, the director of the Manchester City Art Gallery, launched a campaign to raise funds for the purchase of the Cunnigtons' extensive collection. In 1947 the collection was acquired and the Gallery of Costume at Platt Hall was opened. Cunnington served as an honorary advisor to the collection.

== Selected publications ==
- Cunnington, Cecil Willett, (1935) Fashion and Women's Attitudes in the Nineteenth Century, London: W. Heinemann ltd.
- Cunnington, Cecil Willett. (1937) English women's clothing in the nineteenth century, Courier Dover Publications.
- Cunnington, C. Willett. (1941) Why women wear clothes, Faber and Faber.
- Cunnington, C. Willett. (1948) The perfect lady, M. Parrish.
- Cunnington, C. W., & Cunnington, P. (1951) The history of underclothes. Courier Dover Publications.
- Cunnington, C. Willett, and Phillis Cunnington. (1952) Handbook of English mediaeval costume. London: Faber and Faber.
- Cunnington, Cecil Willett. (1954) Handbook of English costume in the sixteenth century. London: Faber & Faber.
- Cunnington, Cecil Willet, and Phillis Cunnington. (1963) Handbook of English costume in the seventeenth century. London: Faber.
- Cunnington, C. Willett, and Phillis Cunnington. (1966) Handbook of English costume in the nineteenth century, Faber & Faber.
