= F. J. Rowe =

Frederick James Rowe (c. 1844 – 5 January 1909) was a Professor of English Literature and sometime Principal at the Presidency College in Calcutta, India. He edited and wrote introductions for numerous collections of the works of Alfred Lord Tennyson. He also collaborated with William Trego Webb to produce a number of English grammar books for Indian students.

Before moving to Presidency College, Rowe was a teacher of English at La Martiniere College in Calcutta. He taught at the school between 1868 and 1870 during which time he penned the school song Vive La Martiniere. The song is now an inseparable part of all school ceremonies, and is sung not just at the Calcutta College but at the other La Martiniere Schools in Lyon, France, and in Lucknow, India, all of which were founded by an endowment from the French adventurer Major General Claude Martin.

Rowe died on 5 January 1909. There is a bronze tablet in his memory in the Memorial Corner inside the Visitors' Lounge at the Calcutta school.

Every November, La Martiniere Calcutta hosts the Reverend James Rowe Basketball Championship, a prestigious national-level invitational basketball tournament named in honour of Frederick James Rowe.

== Selected works ==
- Examples and Exercises in Translation. Bengali-English. Calcutta: Hindu Machine Press, 1902, 339pp.

Co-authored with William Trego Webb:

- Hints on the Study of English. Calcutta: Thacker, Spink & Company, c.1885.
- An Elementary English Grammar. Calcutta: S. K. Lahiri, 1901, 219pp.
- A Guide to the Study of English.

== See also ==
- Vive La Martiniere, the La Martiniere school song
- La Martiniere Calcutta
- La Martiniere Lyon
- La Martiniere Lucknow
