= Platt Fields Park =

Public park in Manchester, England

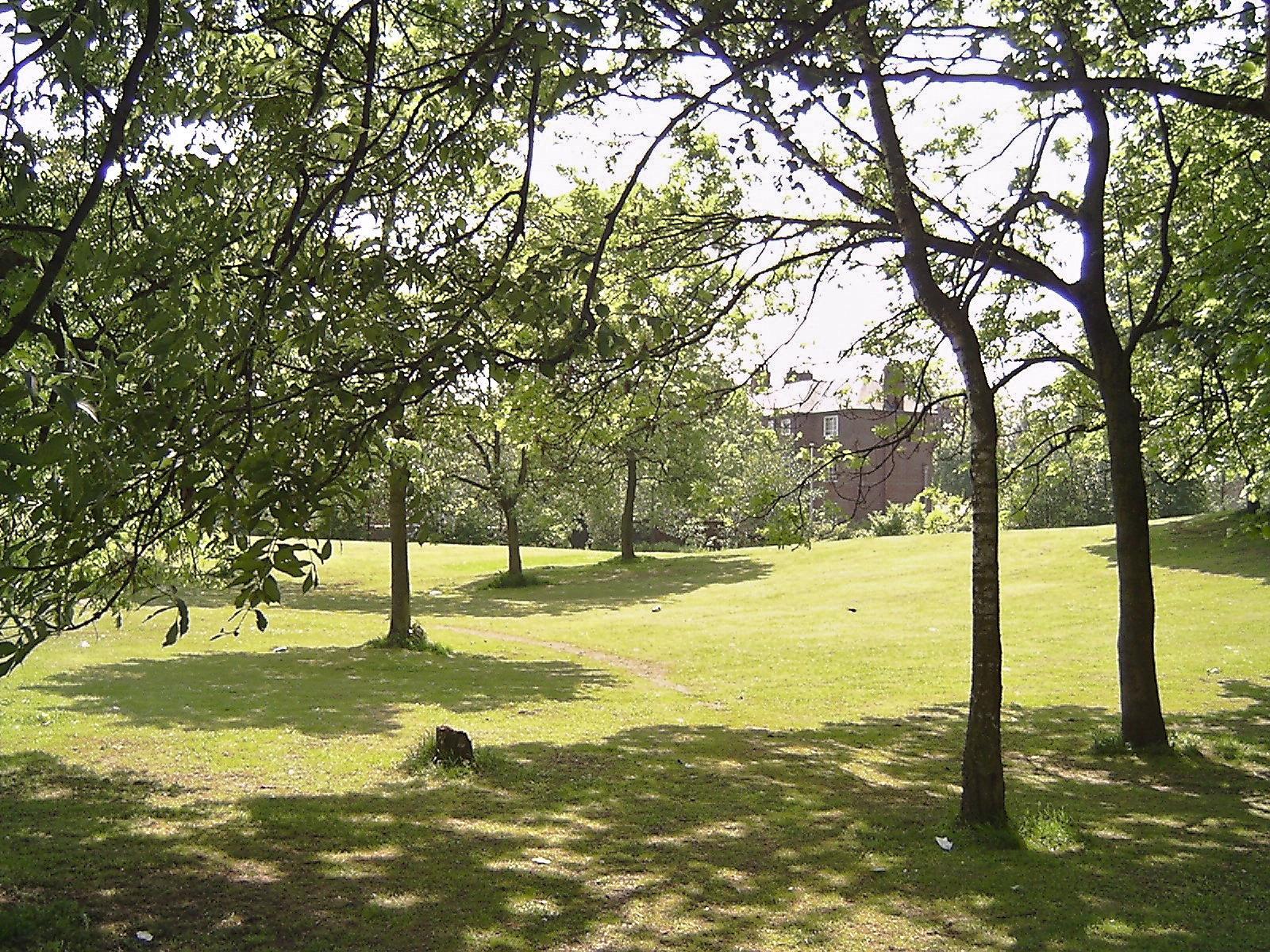
- Interactive map of Platt Fields Park
- Type: Municipal park
- Location: Fallowfield, Manchester, England
- Coordinates: 53.4483°N 2.2245°W
- Area: 70 hectares (170 acres)
- Created: 1908
- Operator: Manchester City Council

Platt Fields Park is a large public park in Fallowfield, Manchester, England which is home to Platt Hall. Fallowfield lies to the south and Wilmslow Road runs along its eastern edge. Its north-eastern corner is close to the start of the Curry Mile.

== Description ==
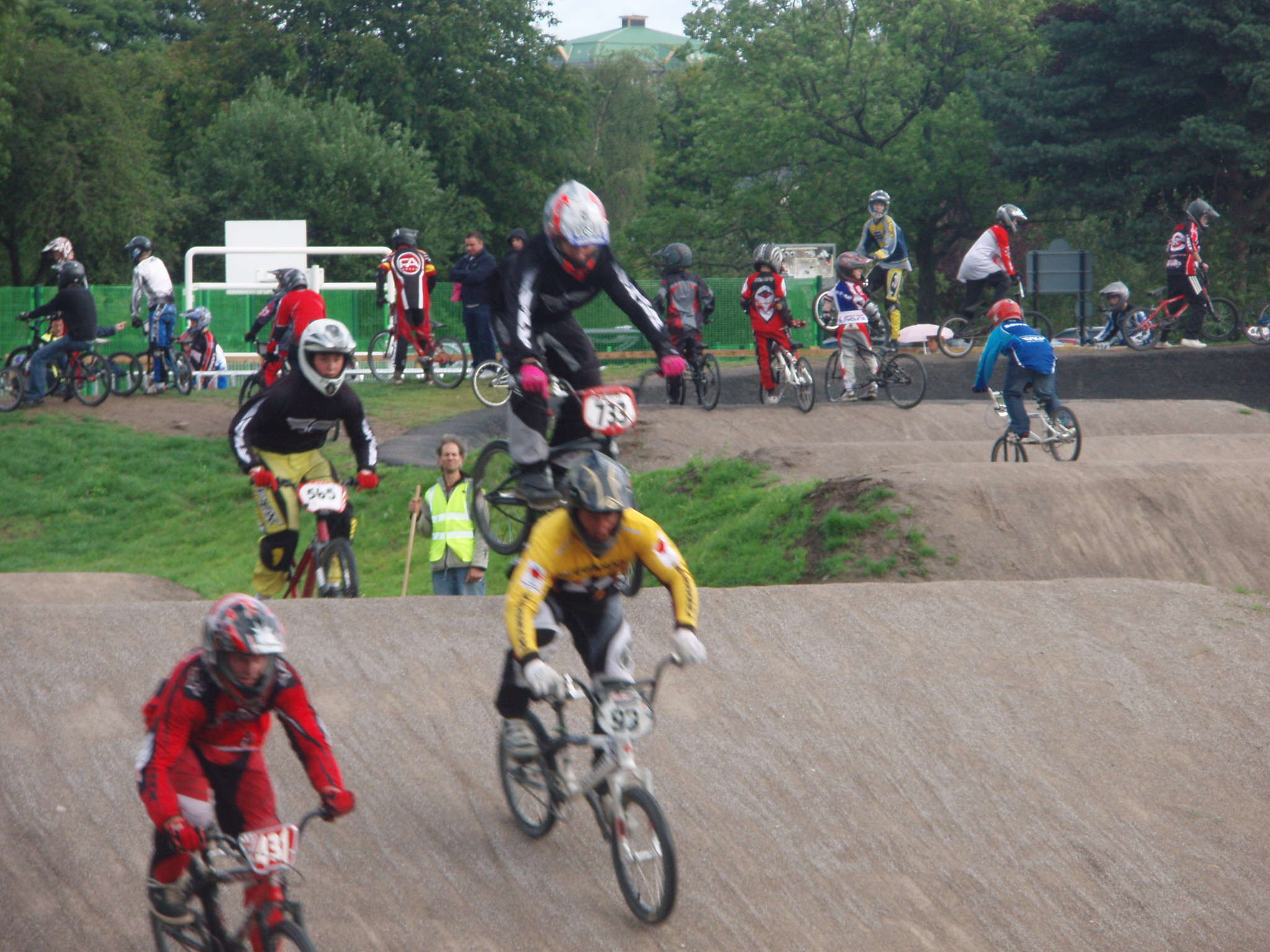
Platt Fields BMX track 2008

The centrepiece of the park is a large pleasure pond, which was once used for boating and fishing. The pond has an island sanctuary in the middle, as well as a pondside visitors' centre and a boathouse. The park also contains part of Gore Brook and part of the Nico (Mickle) Ditch.

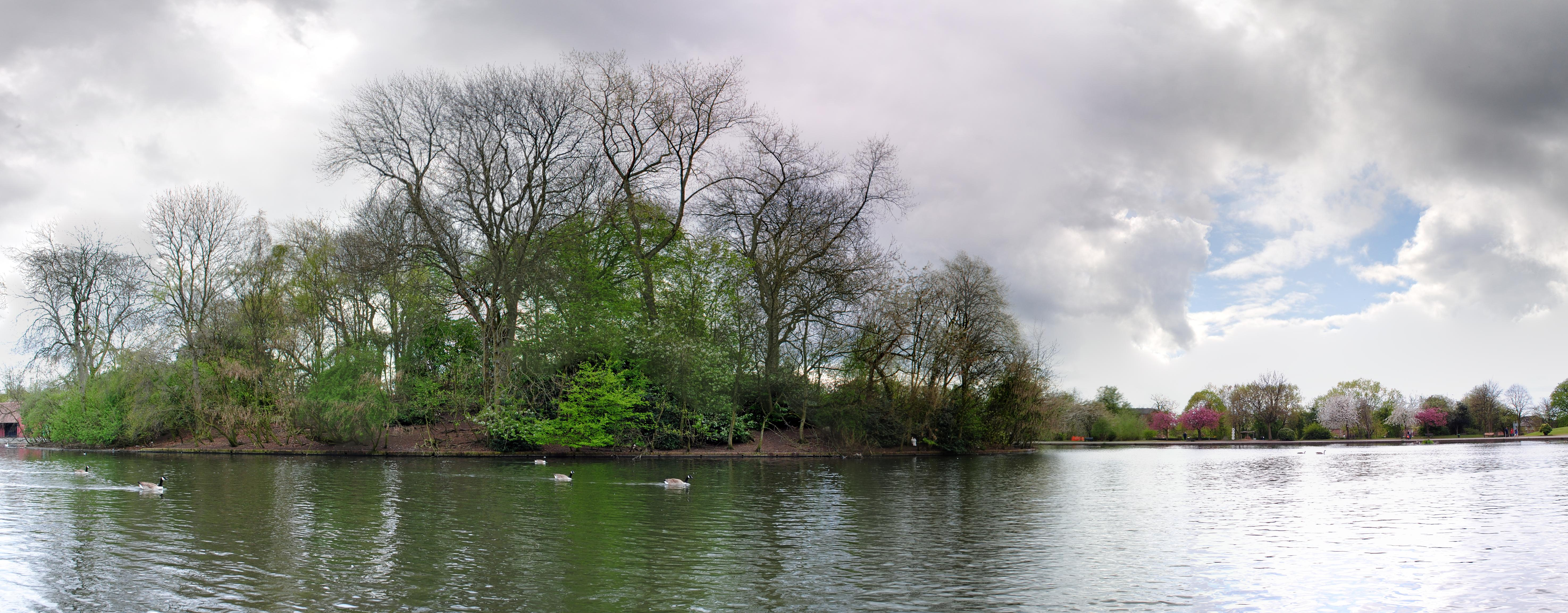
A panorama of the pond and the central island sanctuary

There are gardens of different kinds, including community orchard gardens, which contain ferns, roses and heathers. There is also an educational garden and an environmental area, as well as Elizabeth II Jubilee gardens and an Eco Arts garden near to the boating pond. There is a Shakespearean garden located in the Ashfield part of the park in the south-east corner that was designed to have only plants mentioned in Shakespeare's works. The Ashfield area also has an arch from the nave of Manchester Cathedral, which was previously located at Manley Hall, Manchester for a time. Ashfield was added to the park at a later date: it was formerly the site of Ashfield House and was donated to the city by Edward Donner.

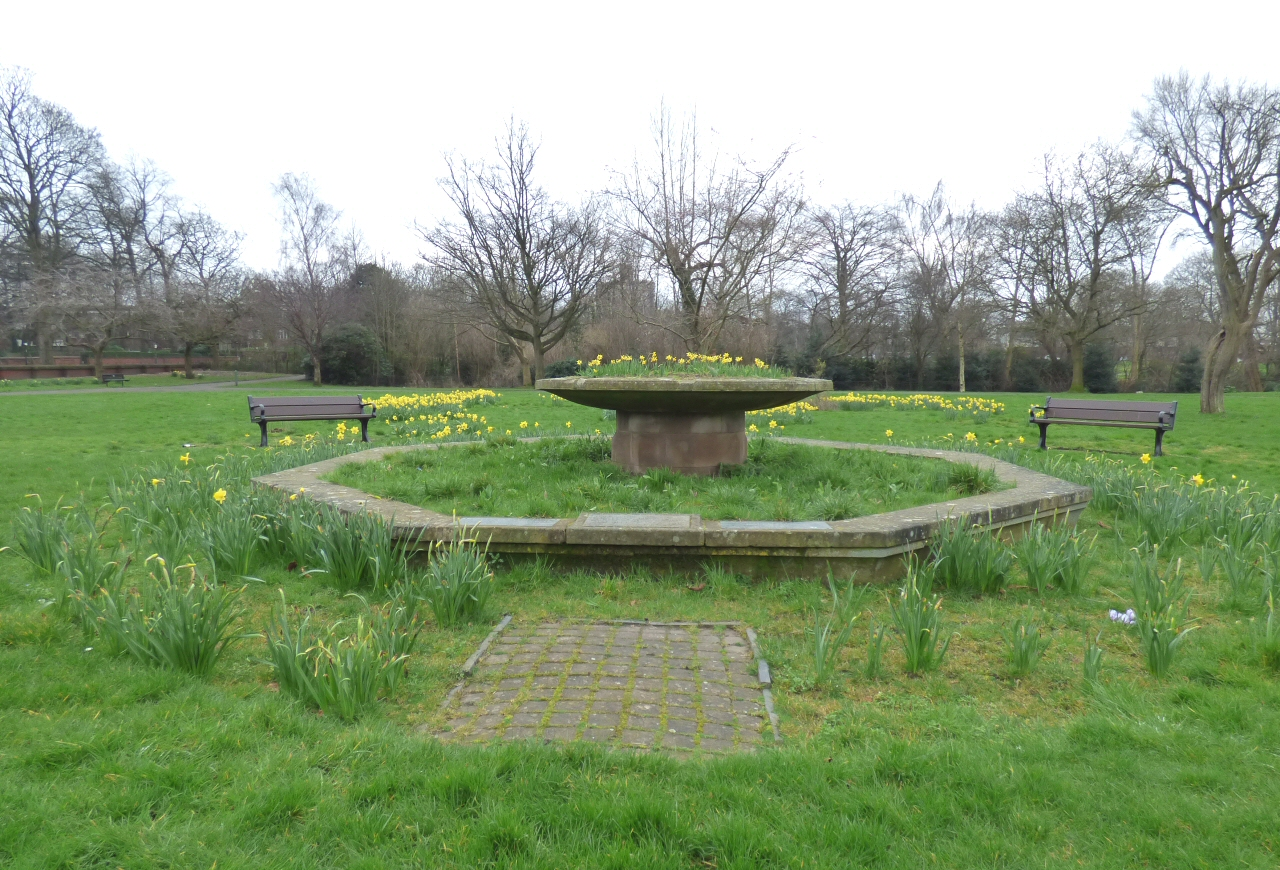
Queen Elizabeth Coronation Fountain, originally from Piccadilly Gardens

In the north-eastern area of the park, near Platt Hall, stands the Queen Elizabeth Coronation fountain. This was moved to Platt Fields in 2002. The fountain had originally stood at the centre of Piccadilly Gardens in Manchester City Centre, where it had been installed to mark the occasion of the Coronation of Queen Elizabeth II in 1953. The fountain can be seen in L. S. Lowry's 1954 oil painting Piccadilly Gardens in its original position in the sunken garden.

There is a labyrinth and picnic area, a veterans' pavilion and children's playgrounds. One playground is for toddlers up to age 5, with the other for kids up to the age of 9. Both are located near to the Lakeside Centre. Sports facilities include a pair of bowling greens and courts for basketball, five-a-side, roller hockey, tennis, as well as a mini soccer pitch, cycle pathways and a skate park. A new BMX track was completed at the South end of the park in the summer of 2008.

The old boathouse is now the location of Platt Fields Bike Hub, a community project involved in bicycle repairs, bike hire and other cycling-oriented projects activities.

There are three dedicated show fields in the park, which have the infrastructure to host large and small scale national and local events. Events hosted in the park have included the Manchester Mela and Eid Festival, as well as annual fireworks and bonfire displays. Until 2003 the site hosted the Manchester Flower Show. Facilities-wise, the site has a car park with disabled parking and toilets. The site also has a park office.

== History ==
The first known mention of the area is from 1150, at which time the "lands of Platt" were given to the Knights of St John by "Matthew, Son of William". Gore Brook is mentioned as being present at the time. The Platt family obtained the estate in 1225, and owned the land for the next 400 years. In 1625 it passed to the Worsley family, and was then a country park bordering on the Cheshire Plain, and called the Platt Hall Estate. The park was landscaped by William Emes in 1768. The Worsley family owned the estate until 1907.

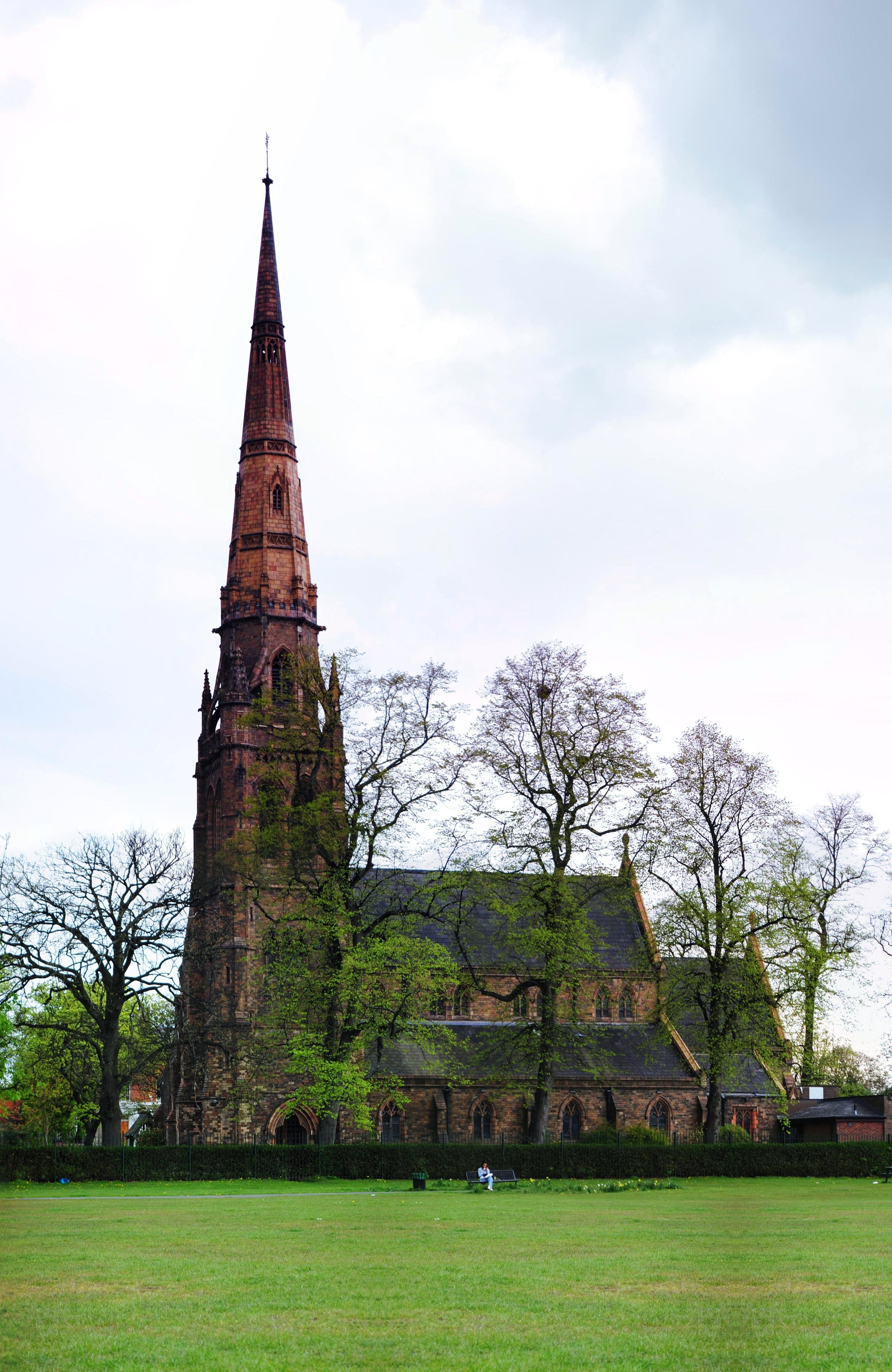
Church of the Holy Trinity from Platt Fields Park

By the early 20th century, the site was a country park with a mansion, though the estate was gradually surrounded by ever-increasing housing, causing Elizabeth Tindal-Carill-Worsley to put the estate on the market in 1907. It soon became apparent that the park was at grave risk of being sold for development and there was even mention of tearing down the hall and using the bricks for housing. William Royle was prominent in mobilising support for the corporation to purchase the estate in order to save the park and house for future generations. This led to the Lord Mayor of Manchester calling a town meeting, at which it was decided to purchase the estate for public parkland, leading to its purchase in 1908 at a cost of £59,975.

During a time of high unemployment during the winter of 1908 and 1909, over 700 men relaid the park, including planting banks with shrubs and trees, diverting the Gore Brook and creating a lake and island covering just over 6 acres (24,000 m^{2}). The park, named Platt Fields Park, was formally opened on 7 May 1910 by the Lord Mayor of Manchester, Sir Charles Behrens. The main lake was provided with a large boathouse and wood covered slipway. It housed not only a fleet of large, clinker-built rowing boats and skiffs but also a fine motor launch, the Archie Littlemore, which gave rides during the summer months. 'Twice Around the Island'. At some point over the following five years, a half-acre, kidney-shaped paddling pool was constructed, on the Hart Road side of the main lake. On the side of the paddling pool away from the Main Lake, two further model boating lakes were constructed. The largest was the home of Platt Fields Model Yacht Club, which had a large, veranda fronted boathouse adjacent to the lake. Alongside was the children's boating lake. This shallow, circular lake was constructed entirely above ground, with raised concrete sides. This meant that children could safely sail, without any danger of falling in. Moving away from the model lakes, towards the Hart Road entrance, the long, narrow field on the right-hand side of the path was home to the local model engineering society, which installed a triple gauge track for large model railway vehicles, including 'live steam' locomotives. The track was raised above the ground on concrete pylons, drivers and passengers riding astride the track. In the centre of the circuit of track stood a wooden clubhouse. Moving on from this point, anti-clockwise around the main lake brought you to the Platt Fields Lido. A 25-yard (23 m) long, open-air swimming pool, with changing facilities. The plunge depth was 3 to 6 feet (0.91 to 1.83 m). In later years the Lido was closed, the plunge filled with soil and surrounded by a fence. This became a rabbit warren, the centrepiece of a Pet's Corner. The changing and ancillary buildings were converted into cages for small animals and birds. In later years, all traces of the former Lido have been removed and the area landscaped. The park was used for a variety of sports, including tennis, football, bowling and cricket. More work was carried out during another time of high unemployment, between 1919 and 1925, when the park and playing fields were levelled, and bowling greens and tennis courts were constructed. Beside the path which leads from the corner of the Main Lake, towards Platt Hall, a large circular amphitheatre was sunk into the ground. At its centre, a stage, with covered bandstand, was surrounded by terraced seating. No trace of this installation remains today, unless you consult an aerial photograph. The position of the amphitheatre is now clearly delineated by a ring of trees which have grown up around the buried structure. A Speakers' Corner was once located near to the adjacent Holy Trinity Platt Church.

The park had a tennis pavilion, which was built in 1926, but was demolished in January 2006 after being empty for several years while waiting to be converted for use by disabled children by the Social Services Department. The park also used to have a Pets Corner and Animal Park, as well as a children's playground, a café, and rose gardens and herbaceous borders. Part of pets corner was actually set in a rectangular sunken area. This area was originally the open air swimming pool.

== Friends of Platt Fields Park ==
The Friends of Platt Fields Park is a voluntary organisation and a registered charity dedicated to maintaining and promoting Platt Fields Park.

== Platt Hall ==
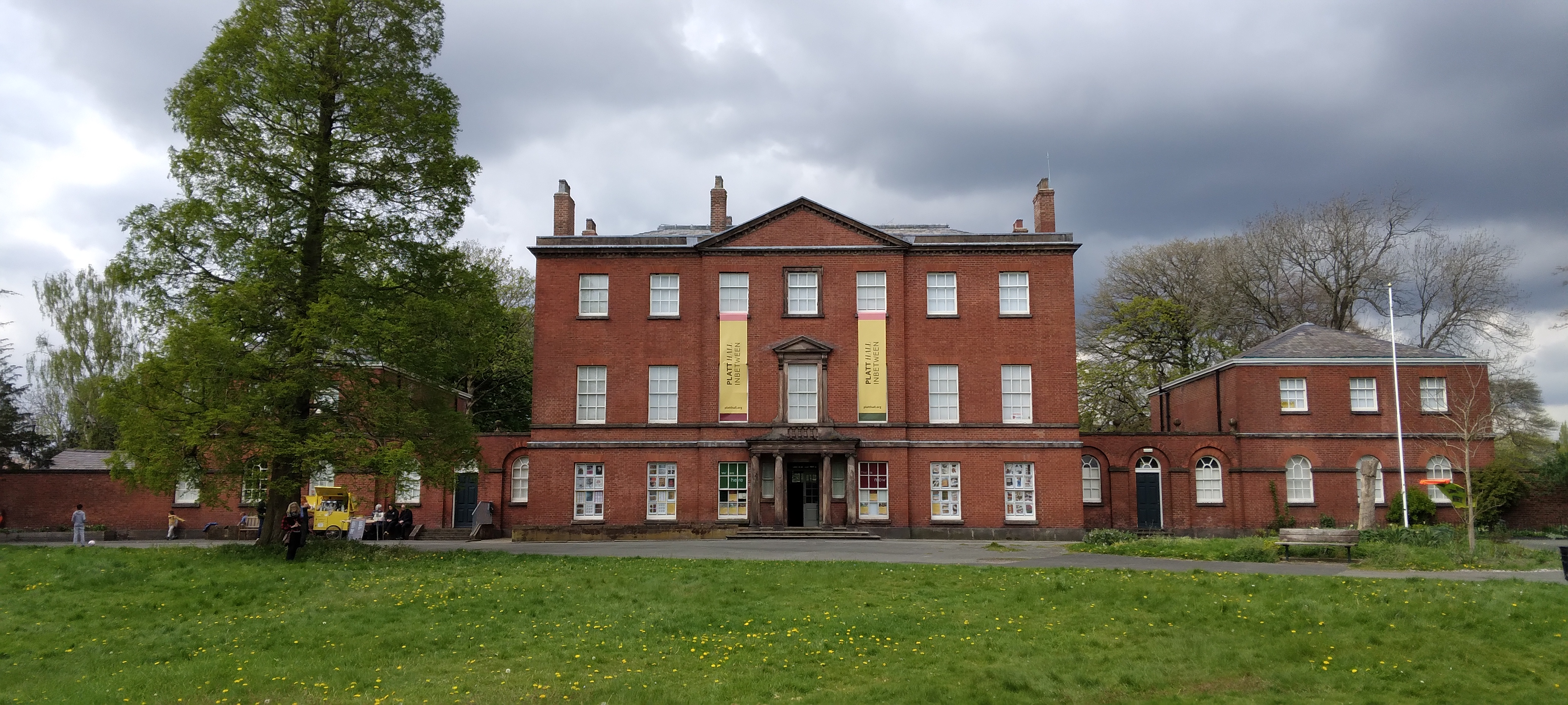
Platt Hall by Thomas Lightoler, c. 1764, home of the Manchester Costume Museum 1947–2020

Platt Hall was the home of the Worsley family for 300 years. The current hall, a grade II* listed Georgian building, was built by John and Deborah Carill-Worsley to the designs of Carr of York, later moderated by Timothy Lightoler, in 1746 at a cost of £10,000. It replaced a timbered black and white building that had been the home of Charles Worsley, one of Cromwell's lieutenants and Major General for Lancashire, Cheshire and Derbyshire during the interregnum.

=== Former Gallery of Costume ===
Between 1947 and 2021, Platt Hall was home to the Gallery of Costume. It originated as the Cecil Willett Cunnington clothes collection and the display spanned the era from the 17th century to the present day. The collection is owned by the Manchester Art Gallery, and from 2021 it was removed from Platt Hall and put into storage, prior to being relocated in a new space at the main gallery on Mosley Street. The future use of Platt Hall is uncertain as it is currently being "re-imagined".

Platt Hall is now a community-focused cultural venue that delivers a wide range of programmes developed in collaboration with local residents and partner organisations. Activities include neighbourhood-based projects, initiatives for people living closest to the Hall, and programmes open to wider audiences, all designed in response to local needs. While the building is not currently open to general visitors due to accessibility limitations, it remains an active hub for community engagement. Through its collections, creativity and cultural programmes, Platt Hall promotes social equality and supports the long-term sustainability of both the Hall and the communities it serves.

== Platt Chapel ==
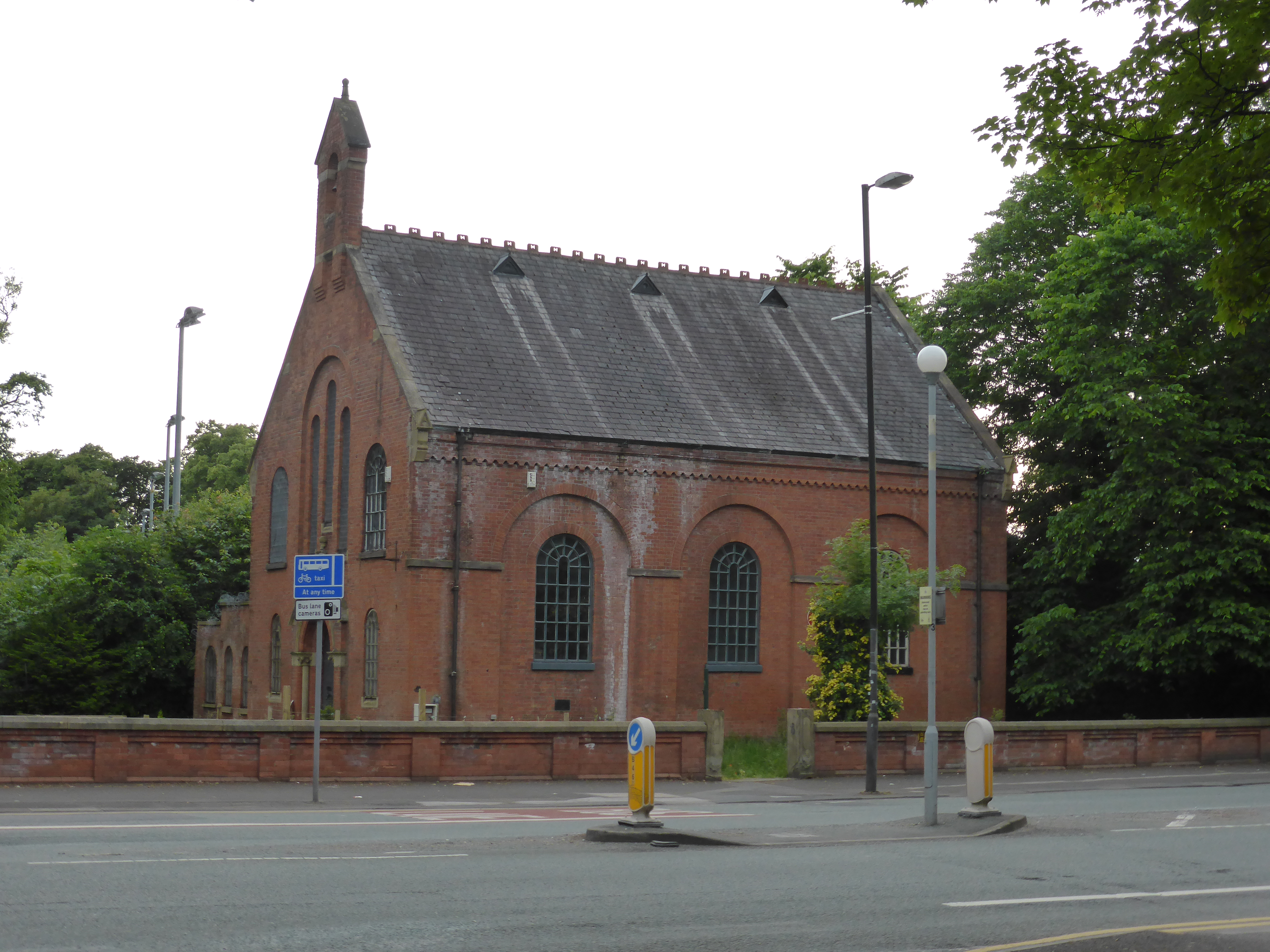
Platt Chapel

The chapel is on Wilmslow Road south of Grangethorpe Road; the present structure is a rebuilding of 1790, then modified in 1874–75. It was a family chapel of the Worsleys of Platt Hall built in 1699, and was constructed for Henry Finch, who had lost the use of the Birch Chapel where he had been installed by the Parliamentarian office Thomas Birch in 1672. The congregation began as Independents (Congregationalists) and became Unitarian during the early 19th century. The ministers succeeding Finch were Robert Hesketh, John Whitaker, Robert Andrews, John Houghton, Richard Meanley, George Checkley (1797–1807), Joseph Lawton Siddall, William Whitelegge (1810–1865), Samuel Alfred Steinthal, and Charles Thomas Poynting.

Since it ceased to be used for worship in 1970 it has been used by various local societies (since 1977). The graveyard, which used to be larger, is surrounded by Platt Fields Park.

== See also ==
- Grade II* listed buildings in Greater Manchester
- Listed buildings in Manchester-M14
- Appleby Lodge, opposite Platt Fields on Wilmslow Road
