= Balinci, North Macedonia =

Balinci Балинци
- Village
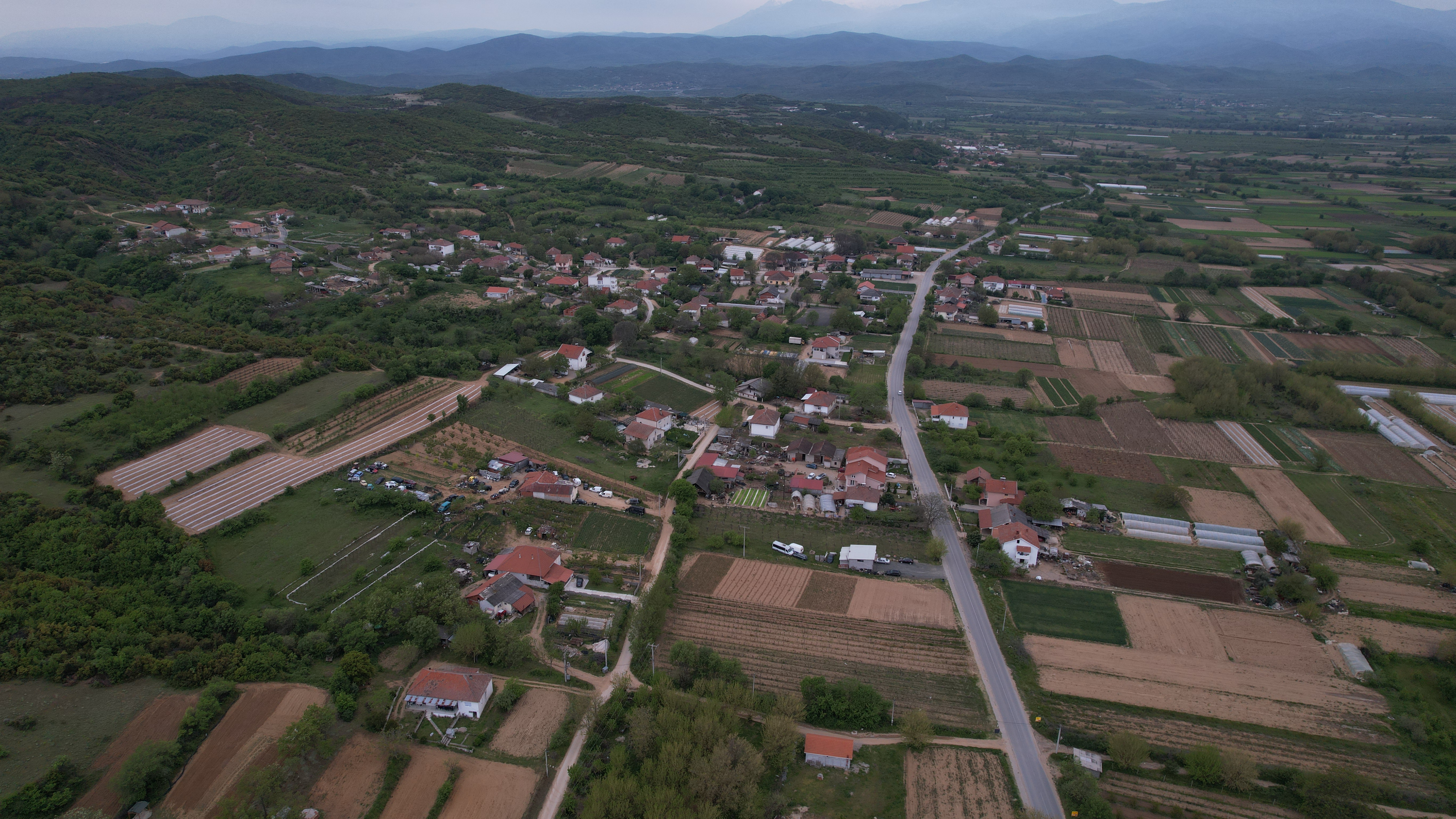
- Airview of the village

- Location within North Macedonia
- Coordinates: 41.288892°N 22.514444°E
- Country: North Macedonia
- Region: Southeastern
- Municipality: Valandovo

Population (2021)
  - Total: 366
- Time zone: UTC+1 (CET)
  - Summer (DST): UTC+2 (CEST)
- Website: .

Balinci (Macedonian: Балинци) is a village in the municipality of Valandovo, North Macedonia.

== Demographics ==
As of the 2021 census, Balinci had 366 residents with the following ethnic composition:

- Macedonians 281
- Serbs 82
- Persons for whom data are taken from administrative sources 3

According to the 2002 census, the village had a total of 328 inhabitants. Ethnic groups in the village include:

- Macedonians 242
- Romani 7
- Serbs 79
