= Francis Haward =

English engraver

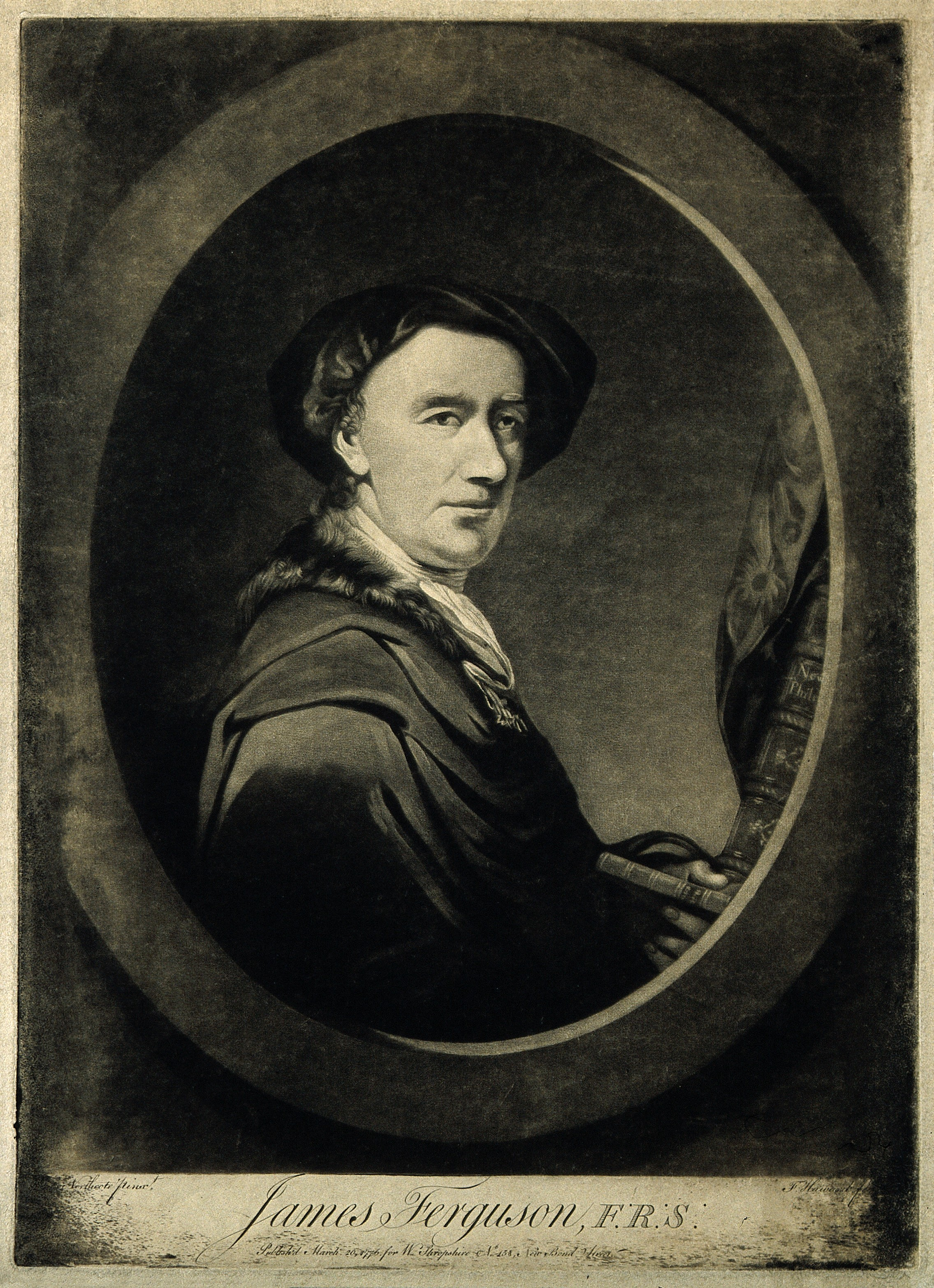
Portrait of James Ferguson. Mezzotint by Francis Haward, after James Northcote

Francis Haward (19 April 1759 – June 1797) was an English engraver. He was appointed Engraver to H.R.H. the Prince of Wales.

== Life ==
Haward was born in 1759. He was apprenticed to the engraver Thomas Watson in 1774, and in 1776 he became a student of the Royal Academy of Art; in the same year he engraved in mezzotint a portrait of the astronomer James Ferguson, after James Northcote. His other engravings in mezzotint are "Master Bunbury," after Sir Joshua Reynolds (1781), and "Euphrasia," after William Hamilton.

Haward subsequently adopted the stipple engraving method of Francesco Bartolozzi. His principal engravings in this method are "Mrs Siddons as the Tragic Muse," and "Cymon and Iphigenia," after Sir Joshua Reynolds; the former was exhibited at the Royal Academy in 1787, and the latter in 1797. He also exhibited in 1783 "A Cupid," in 1788 "Portrait of Madam d'Eon in her 25th year, from a picture by Angelica Kauffmann," in 1792 an unfinished engraving, and in 1793 a finished proof of "The Prince of Wales," after Sir Joshua Reynolds. Among his other engravings are "The Infant Academy," after Reynolds, portraits of Charles, Marquess Cornwallis, and of Captain William Cornwallis, both after Daniel Gardner, and others after Rosalba Carriera, William Hamilton, and Antonio Zucchi.

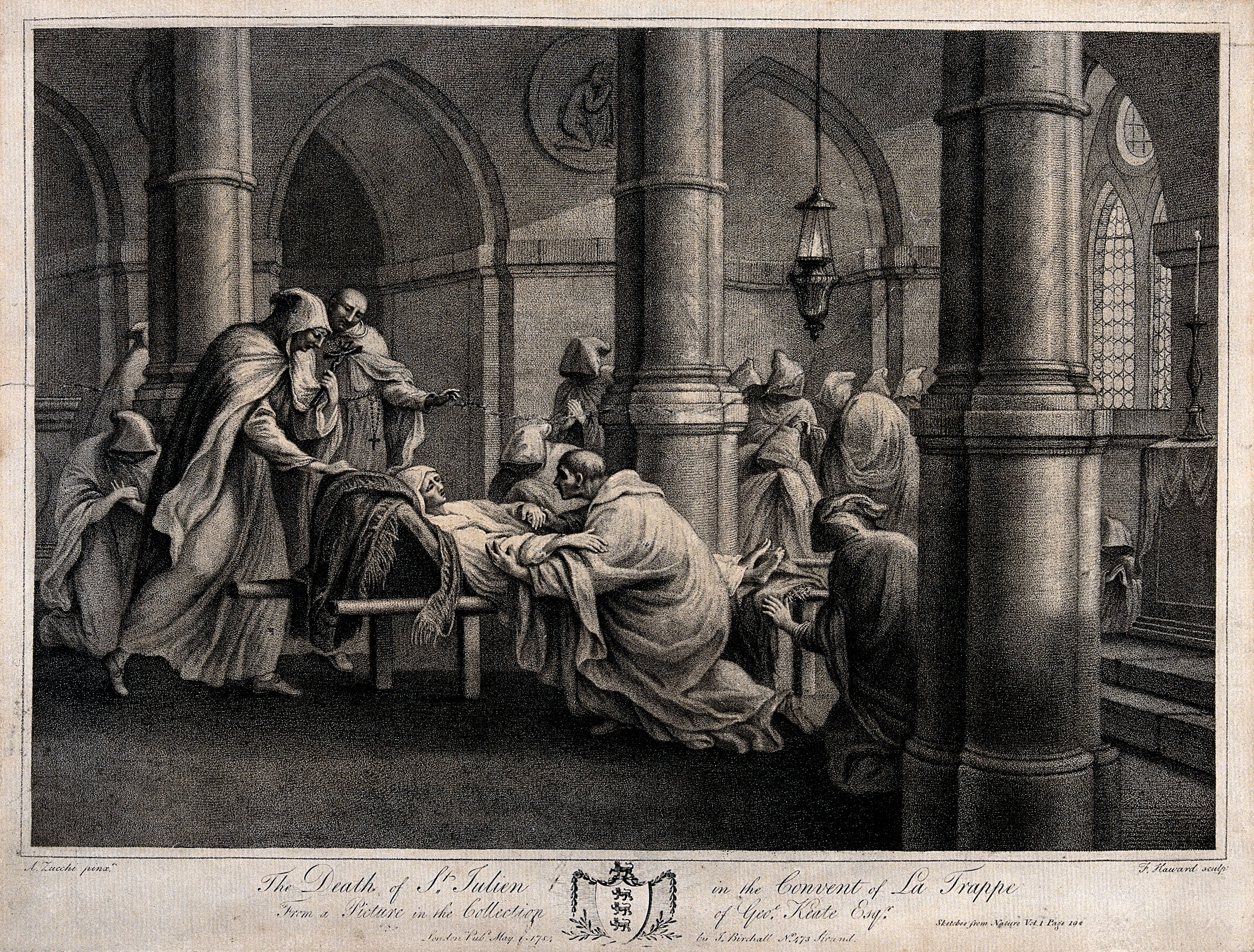
"The death of Saint Julian". Stipple engraving by Francis Haward, after Antonio Zucchi

Haward was elected an associate engraver of the Academy in 1783, and was eventually appointed Engraver to H.R.H. the Prince of Wales. He and his wife Mary lived for many years in Marsh Street, Lambeth. His last engraving, completed shortly before his death in June 1797, was "Cymon and Iphigenia". He was buried on 30 June at St Mary-at-Lambeth. His widow received a pension from the Royal Academy until her death in 1839.
