= Naqvi =

Naqvi is a family name. It may refer to:

- Afsar Madad Naqvi (1933–1997), Pakistani sculptor
- Ali Naqi Naqvi (1905–1988), Twelver Shia scholar, poet, and jurist
- Ali Naqvi (cricketer) (born 1977), former Pakistani cricketer
- Antum Naqvi (born 1999), Belgian-Zimbabwean cricketer
- Arif Naqvi (born 1960), Pakistani businessman and founder of the Abraaj Group and the Aman Foundation
- Baqar Naqvi (1936–2019), Pakistani poet, prose writer and translator
- Farah Naqvi, Indian feminist, writer, and activist
- Fatima Naqvi, literary scholar and film scholar
- Firdous Shamim Naqvi, Pakistani politician
- Ghulam Raza Naqvi (died 2016), co-founder of the Pakistani Shia political party Sipah-e-Muhammad Pakistan
- H. M. Naqvi (born 1973), Pakistani novelist
- Hilal Naqvi (born 1950), Pakistani poet
- Jawad Naqvi (born 1963), Pakistani Islamic scholar and religious leader
- Kalbe Razi Naqvi (born 1944), British Pakistani-Norwegian physicist
- Maniza Naqvi (born 1960), Pakistani writer
- Mazahar Ali Akbar Naqvi (born 1960), former Justice of the Supreme Court of Pakistan
- Mohammed Ali Naqvi (born 1979), Pakistani filmmaker based in New York City
- Mohsin Naqvi (born 1978), Pakistani politician and media mogul
- Mohsin Naqvi (poet) (1947−1996), Pakistani poet
- Muhammad Jewan Shah Naqvi, Islamic saint of Allo Mahar, Pakistan
- Mukhtar Abbas Naqvi (born 1957), Indian politician
- Nawab Haider Naqvi (1935–2024), Pakistani economist and scholar
- Qaiser Naqvi (born 1958), Pakistani actress
- Saeed Naqvi (born 1940), Indian journalist, television commentator, and interviewer
- Sarah Naqvi (born 1996), Indian textile artist
- Shehanshah Hussain Naqvi (born 1974), Pakistani Shia scholar
- Swaleh Naqvi (1933–2019), British Pakistani banker
- Syed Ali Naqi Naqvi Qumi (born 1970), Pakistani Ayatollah
- Syed Amir Haider Kamal Naqvi (born 1918), popularly known as Kamal Amrohi, Indian film director, producer, and screenwriter.
- Syed Hasnain Raza Naqvi, Indian Urdu-language poet
- Syed Mahmood Naqvi (1941—2009), Indian Earth scientist
- Syed Saif Abbas Naqvi, Indian Twelver Shia cleric
- Syed Sajid Ali Naqvi, Pakistani Shia scholar and founder of the Islami Tehreek Pakistan policital party
- Syed Sohail Hussain Naqvi, Pakistani academic and rector of the University of Central Asia
- Syeda Shehrbano Naqvi (born 1998), Pakistani police officer
- Tahir Naqvi (born 1942), Pakistani writer of short stories
- Tahira Naqvi (1956–1982), Pakistani actress
- Tanveer Naqvi, Pakistani general
- Tanvir Naqvi (1919–1972), Pakistani lyricist and poet
- Tauqir Hussain Naqvi, Pakistani admiral, politician, and diplomat
- Yasir Naqvi (born 1973), Canadian politician
- Zafar Ali Naqvi (born 1948), Indian politician
- Zafar H. Naqvi (born 1945), Pakistani general
- Zehra Naqvi, Australian actress
- Zulfiqar Naqvi (born 1965), Pakistani poet

== See also ==
- Ali Naqvi (disambiguation)
