= Amrohi Syed =

Indian Shia community

Sadaat-e-Amroha
سادات امروہہ

Regions with significant populations
- India; Pakistan; United Kingdom

Languages
- Urdu; Hindi; Khari Boli

Religion
- Islam (predominantly Twelver Shia)

Related ethnic groups
- Sayyid; Sayyid of Uttar Pradesh; Sadaat-e-Bilgram; Saadat-e-Bara; Dakoha Sadaat; Syed Nagli

The Sadaat-e-Amroha (Urdu: سادات امروہہ), also known as the Amrohi Sayyid or Sayyid of Amroha, are a community of Sayyid Muslims historically settled in the town of Amroha in the Indian state of Uttar Pradesh. The community is predominantly Twelver Shia and traces its lineage principally through the Naqvi line, with Abidi, Jafri and Taqvi sub-branches. Following the partition of India in 1947, a substantial portion of the community migrated to Pakistan, settling principally in Karachi; smaller diaspora communities are present in the United Kingdom as well as Canada.

== History ==
=== Origins and settlement ===
Amroha is the site of one of the oldest Naqvi Sayyid settlements in India. Community tradition records the arrival of the first Naqvi settlers from Wasit in Iraq in the late 12th century, conventionally dated to 1190 CE. The most prominent figure associated with the community's early history is the Sufi saint Syed Sharfuddin Shah Wilayat (died 1340 CE/740 AH), who is said to have arrived in Amroha around 1272 CE; his shrine at Islam Nagar, Amroha, remains a centre of veneration, with an annual urs held on 21 Rajab.

According to local tradition, the saint's son Sayyid Mir Ali Buzurg was appointed Qazi (judge) of Amroha by the Delhi Sultanate in the late 13th century, marking the community's early integration into the administrative life of the Sultanate. A further descendant, Sayyid Abdul Aziz, is recorded as having married a daughter of Sultan Firuz Shah Tughlaq.

=== Mughal and post-Mughal periods ===
During the Mughal period, the Amrohi Sayyids served as part of the regional military and service gentry, holding mansabs and jagirs in the Rohilkhand region.

In 1772, during the Maratha campaign in Rohilkhand under Mahadji Shinde, Amrohi Sayyid contingents took part in the local resistance organised by the Rohilla chief Zabita Khan. Although the Marathas overpowered the defenders, Amroha itself was substantially spared the destruction inflicted on neighbouring towns, partly through negotiation.

The community has retained a strong presence in Amroha into the modern period; the 1872 census of the North-Western Provinces is reported to have recorded approximately 6,700 Sayyids resident in the town, of a Muslim population of around 70,000.

== Shrine of Shah Wilayat ==
The shrine (mazar) of Shah Wilayat in Amroha is associated with a long-standing local tradition that the scorpions found within its precincts do not sting human visitors.

== Migration and present circumstances ==
A significant proportion of the Sadaat-e-Amroha migrated to Pakistan after the partition of India in 1947, settling principally in Karachi. The community in present-day Amroha and the Pakistani diaspora maintain links through community organisations, the principal one being the Anjuman Sadaat-e-Amroha.

A number of Pakistani literary and artistic figures with origins in Amroha have been identified as belonging to or associated with the community, including the poets Rais Amrohvi and Jaun Elia, the artist Sadequain, and the Naat reciter Umme Habiba.
