= Muhammad Tauseef Ahmed =

Pakistani footballer (1992–2017)

- Tauseef at the 2012 Summer Olympics qualifiers

Personal information
- Full name: Muhammad Tauseef Ahmed
- Date of birth: 2 April 1992
- Place of birth: Faisalabad, Pakistan
- Date of death: 27 February 2017 (aged 24)
- Place of death: Faisalabad, Pakistan
- Height: 1.70 m (5 ft 7 in)
- Position: Midfielder

Senior career*
Years	Team	Apps	(Gls)
2010–2013	WAPDA		
2013–2015	Lyallpur		
2015–2017	WAPDA		

International career
2010–2011	Pakistan U23		
2015	Pakistan	1	(0)
- * Club domestic league appearances and goals

Muhammad Tauseef Ahmed (2 April 1992 – 27 February 2017) was a Pakistani footballer who played as a midfielder. Tauseef earned one international cap with Pakistan. Tauseef also represented Pakistan under-23 at the 2010 Asian Games, the 2012 Summer Olympics qualifiers and in test series against Palestine, where he scored a goal.

== Early life ==
Ahmed was born on 2 April 1992, and hailed from Faisalabad in the Punjab province of Pakistan.

== Club career ==
Tauseef raised to fame at the Super Football League in 2007 while representing Islamabad United, where he helped the side to be crowned champions. He then represented WAPDA in the Pakistan Premier League. He was also gold medallist for WAPDA in the 2011 National Games of Pakistan. Ahmed also captained WAPDA, and was known as one of the most dependable players of the squad. He also played for his hometown club Lyallpur.

== International career ==
=== Early years ===
Tauseef was first called by the Pakistan national under-23 team for 2010 Asian Games, followed by a tour in Thailand in 2011. He then played against Malaysia in January 2011, at the first leg of the 2012 Summer Olympics qualifiers. In 2011, he represented the Olympic under-23 team for a series of friendlies against Palestine. In the first match down 0–2, Pakistan in the 36th minute was awarded a penalty kick which was converted by Tauseef at the top right corner to seal a goal at Palestine goalkeeper and captain Abdullah Al-Saidawi. Palestine ended winning the match by 2–1 at the Punjab Stadium in Lahore. Tauseef's goal was also first for Pakistan in international arena since 8 December 2009 at the 2009 SAFF Championship.

=== Injury ===
"I have consulted various doctors with all reaching the same conclusion which is surgery. It is an expensive procedure with estimated costs of Rs600,000 but the federation doctors, other than arranging for an MRI, say that they can only offer me Rs 40 or 50 thousand. I have to arrange the rest of the amount myself somehow."

— Tauseef in an interview with Dawn

In the second encounter against Palestine on 4 March 2011 at the Peoples Football Stadium in Karachi ending in a goalless draw, Tauseef broke his posterior cruciate ligament.

After over four months since the injury, Tauseef was reportedly still suffering with no help in sight. With no facility of health insurance available to the players, the Pakistan Football Federation were unwilling to address the issue while the injury threatened to end Tauseef's career. Tauseef's department club WAPDA couldn't help either, as the former was just a contractual player instead of a permanent employee of the company. Tauseef meanwhile was left to his own to address the issue and ease the pain.

=== Return to international football ===
On 6 February 2015, Tauseef returned to international arena and made his senior international debut in a friendly against Afghanistan as a starter, ending in a 2–1 victory for Pakistan.

Tauseef then missed international exposure for the next years, as since March 2015, Pakistan remained suspended from any international competition because of the crisis created inside the Pakistan Football Federation.

== Death ==
Tauseef died on 27 February 2017, at the age of 24. He was a diabetes patient, and was taken to a hospital in his hometown of Faisalabad when his sugar level surged after suffering from high fever, and ultimately he succumbed to his illness. One of his coaches stated that he felt a sudden pressure on his kidneys and was taken to hospital, where he expired.

Ahmed was laid to rest in his village in Thikriwala in Faisalabad after Zuhr prayers. He was survived by his parents, an elder brother and four sisters.

=== Aftermath ===
Tauseef's death commotioned the Pakistan football community, with several personalities expressing deep sorrow and condolence over the demise of Tauseef, including his teammates, coaches such as Shahzad Anwar, Nasir Ismail, and national team former captains Muhammad Essa and Tanveer Ahmed. Tariq Lutfi highlighted his importance in the 2012 Summer Olympics qualifiers when he needed a solid midfielder. Former England national team footballer and Pakistan national team coach Graham Roberts stated to Dawn via Twitter: "Tauseef was a great lad who worked very hard and was a pleasure to coach, he was skilful and very competitive. He gave his all when he played."

"Touseef kept on calling the PFF management; he even went to Lahore and tried to speak to the officials personally, but none of them even asked how he was doing after the injury. At one point PFF officials stopped receiving his calls. He was disheartened that one moment he was the star player from Faisalabad, getting praises from everyone, and in the next he was nothing. He almost begged the PFF for the help before coming to terms with the reality and stopping."

— Tauseef's teammate Naeemullah during an interview with The Express Tribune

The Pakistan Football Federation faced criticism for its treatment of Tauseef at an age when he should have been flourishing in his football career. His untimely death, caused by avoidable circumstances, highlighted the neglect faced. Despite his efforts to contact PFF officials and even meeting them in person in Lahore, he received no concern or assistance for his injury, feeling abandoned by the organisation. Tauseef's teammate, Naeemullah, lamented the lack of support from PFF in an interview with The Express Tribune.

After his injury, despite assurances from the PFF, he received no financial support or proper medical care. Instead, he was shuffled between inadequate medical practitioners until it was too late. By the time he received proper treatment, the damage was irreversible due to untreated diabetes exacerbated by the neglect of his knee injury. The physical pain from his knee injury paled in comparison to the emotional anguish caused by the PFF's indifference to his plight.

WAPDA captain and national team striker Arif Mehmood criticised the Pakistan football departments, stating: "We represent these departments but if one gets sick or injured then they are left to rot on their own. Touseef's case is the same."

== Career statistics ==
=== International ===
Appearances and goals by year and competition
National team	Year	Apps	Goals
Pakistan	2015	1	0
Total		1	0

== Honours ==
=== Islamabad United ===
- Super Football League: 2007

WAPDA

- National Games of Pakistan: 2011
