= Rainbow Rangers =

American animated television series

- Genre: Fantasy; Science fiction Adventure; Comedy; Action
- Created by: Rob Minkoff; Shane Morris; Tim Mansfield; Elise Allen
- Voices of: Aileen Mythen; Juliette Crosbie; Philipa Alexander; Zehra Naqvi; Penelope Rawlins; Dan Russell
- Theme music composer: Paul Westerberg
- Opening theme: "Rainbow Rangers Theme Song"
- Ending theme: "Rainbow Rangers Theme Song (Reprise)"
- Countries of origin: United States; Ireland
- Original language: English
- No. of seasons: 3
- No. of episodes: 62 (124 segments)

Production
- Executive producers: Andy Heyward; Rob Minkoff; Shane Morris; Tim Mansfield; Elise Allen; Paul Cummins
- Producer: Andy Heyward
- Running time: 11 minutes (segments); 22 minutes (whole)
- Production companies: Genius Brands; Telegael

Original release
- Network: Nick Jr. Channel
- Release: November 5, 2018 – April 15, 2022

Rainbow Rangers is an American-Irish animated television series co-produced by Genius Brands and Telegael Teoranta which premiered on the Nick Jr. Channel on November 5, 2018. The series follows seven nine-year-old girls who reside in the kingdom of Kaleidoscopia. The series was renewed for a second season, with the initial half-season of 13 episodes premiering on October 6, 2019, and a further 13 episodes premiering on October 11, 2020. On April 12, 2021, a third and final season was greenlit. The show’s final episodes aired on April 15, 2022.

== Plot ==
Rainbow Rangers takes place in the magical land of Kaleidoscopia and focuses on the adventures of seven 9-year-old girls—Rosie Redd, Mandarin Orange, Anna Banana, Pepper Mintz, Bonnie Blueberry, Indigo Allfruit, and Lavender LaViolette—who are all represented by the colors of the rainbow. Each use their own powers to help protect the citizens of their land, clean the planet, and make the world a better place while also contending with the Praxton family.

Each episode begins with a problem with nature seen on Earth. A rainbow is sent to Kaleidoscopia and Kalia calls all seven rangers and Floof to her. After they are shown the nature problem, Kalia chooses the three ideal rangers for the mission, Floof mostly joins the three on their scooters while the others remain behind and commentate on the situation. When the mission is completed, the three rangers return to Kaleidoscopia on their scooters.

== Characters ==
=== Main ===
- Rosie Redd (voiced by Aileen Mythen) is the leader. She represents the color Red and possesses Strength Power (primarily, superhuman strength that only works within a planetary atmosphere), with a special visor in her tiara that allows her to see through objects much like an X-ray.
- Mandarin "Mandy" Orange (voiced by Aileen Mythen) is the cheerleader of the group. She is an African American. Mandarin represents the color Orange and possesses Music Power when using her recorder. She also has sound power, able to hear any sound from wherever the objective of the mission is located.
- Anna Banana (voiced by Juliette Crosbie) is naive and sweet, also she can talk to animals. She represents the color Yellow and possesses Animal Power, being able to communicate with animals. Anna carries a yellow stuffed rabbit named Mr. Stuffie Wuffie which is used for comforting animals.
- Pepper Mintz (voiced by Phillipa Alexander) is a shy, introverted bookworm who loves to read. She is Hispanic. Pepper represents the color Green and possesses Inviso Power via a special shawl that cloaks whoever is underneath it, rendering them invisible.
- Bonnie "BB" Blueberry (voiced by Zehra Jane Naqvi) is analytical and smart. She always says that things are logical or illogical. Bonnie represents the color Blue and possesses Vision Power capable of seeing great distances. She also features a wrist-mounted device known as the Construct-O-Max, which allows her to create, fix or deconstruct whatever the rangers need.
- Indigo "Indy" Allfruit (voiced by Penelope Rawlins), the prankster and the second-in-command of the group. She is an Asian American. Indy represents the color indigo and possesses Speed Power, the ability to run or move at superhuman speeds. According to Mandy, her middle name is "Esmeralda".
- Lavender LaViolette (voiced by Penelope Rawlins) is a fashionista. She is an African American. Lavender represents the color Violet and possesses Micro Power. In addition to shrinking, she also gains a pair of fairy wings that allow her to fly.
- Floof (voiced by Phillipa Alexander) is the Rangers' pet unicorn-like Prismacorn (according to Bonnie Blueberry in "Divided We Fall") who only speaks by saying his name. He is the only male living in Kaleidoscopia and accompanies them on their mission and helps out by using his magical horn. There is a running gag where Floof comes out of his door in a surprising or funny way like slipping or his horn briefly detaching.
- Kalia (voiced by Phillipa Alexander) is the leader of Kaleidoscopia and when she sees trouble in the world she calls the Rainbow Rangers to the rescue while selecting the members most compatible with the mission.

=== Villains ===
- Preston Praxton (voiced by Dan Russell) is the main antagonist of the series. An entrepreneur obsessed with money, he schemes with no regard for any environmental impact, causing the Rangers to try and stop him. Preston has an endless supply of booby traps to keep the Rangers from interfering with his business, though the Rangers have been able to talk him into environmentally friendly solutions with business propositions (or if Patty sides with the Rangers).
  - Patty Praxton (voiced by Zehra Jane Naqvi) is Preston's daughter. While she does take after her money-loving father, she often serves as his voice of reason and is on friendlier terms with the Rangers.
  - Priscilla Praxton (voiced by Dan Russell) debuts in season 2 as Preston's sister and Patty's paternal aunt who often competes with him to win Patty's affection and take down the Rangers. She tends to have more feminine schemes such as creating luxury makeup lines or creating glass from sand.

== Episodes ==
=== Series overview ===
Season	Episodes	Originally released	
Season	Episodes	First released	Last released
1	26	November 5, 2018	September 29, 2019
2	26	October 6, 2019	January 10, 2021
3	10	April 15, 2022	

=== Season 1 (2018–19) ===
No. overall	No. in season	Title	Directed by	Written by	Original release date	Prod. code	U.S. viewers (millions)
1	1	"Go With the Rainbow Floe"	Michael Maliani & Sean Scott	Elise Allen	November 5, 2018	101	0.25
1	1	"Northern Lights"	Michael Maliani & Sean Scott	Dan Danko	November 5, 2018	101	0.25
Rosie, Anna, and Bonnie B.B. Blueberry go to Baffin Island to save a baby polar bear stranded on an ice floe, but things start to get tricky when Rosie rushes in without planning, and she ends up scaring the cub further. Rosie, Anna, and Mandy lose their Spectra Scooters while helping a seal family in Lake Saima and discover the northern lights, though Anna insists at finishing quickly, as since she is afraid of the dark she doesn't want to stay until nighttime.
2	2	"Monarch Migration"	Michael Maliani & Sean Scott	Dan Danko	November 6, 2018	104	N/A
2	2	"That Sinking Feeling"	Michael Maliani & Sean Scott	Gus Constantellis	November 6, 2018	104	N/A
Pepper, Anna, and Indigo head to Illinois to help a kaleidoscope of butterflies migrate to their new home in Mexico by building a storm shelter for them, but they also have the hurry before any more bad weather hits. Rosie, Anna, and Pepper help a mother horse in Texas who's fallen into a sinkhole. Pepper, however, is afraid of tight and small spaces, and is reluctant to get in the particularly cramped area with the mare, especially after the other 2 rangers fall in the pit.
3	3	"Tree Hugger"	Michael Maliani & Sean Scott	Hilary Cherniss & Sara Jane Sluke	November 7, 2018	102	N/A
3	3	"Turtle in a Net"	Michael Maliani & Sean Scott	Aaron Simpson	November 7, 2018	102	N/A
Rosie, B.B., and Lavender help save a forest in Colorado from deforestation at Preston Praxton's nefarious hands, though their efforts to stop his plan at constructing a water park are hampered when he traps them in a front end loader rigged as a booby trap. B.B., Indigo, and Rosie have to go the South Pacific Ocean to save a sea turtle caught in a fishing net, but the net turns out to be from a shrimping boat owned by Preston Praxton, and he strands them below the waves to keep them out of his way.
4	4	"Sludge Stream"	Michael Maliani & Sean Scott	Hilary Cherniss & Sara Jane Sluke	November 8, 2018	106	0.23
4	4	"The Tsunami"	Michael Maliani & Sean Scott	Peter Hunziker	November 8, 2018	106	0.23
Rosie, Pepper, and Indigo have to stop a sludge stream in Colorado from flowing, additionally they have to stop a boy from coming to harm from touching the industrial waste. They find the sludge to be coming from one of Preston Praxton's factory sites, and their two-part plan quickly comes into trouble. B.B., Anna, and Mandy head to Australia & try save Preston and Patty from a tsunami. But Preston, wanting the whole beach to himself, refuses to leave and places everyone left in grave danger, even more so when he begins following treasure instead of the rangers' instructions.
5	5	"When Beetles Bark"	Michael Maliani & Sean Scott	Peter Hunziker	November 9, 2018	103	N/A
5	5	"Pollution Island"	Michael Maliani & Sean Scott	Gus Constantellis	November 9, 2018	103	N/A
Lavender, Rosie, and Anna save a bear's home in Montana from beetles that feed on tree bark, but afraid of all bugs Lavender is extremely reluctant to help out when she has to act as a speaker for the beetles on the rangers' behalf. Upon being rounded up as their queen, however, she almost jeopardizes their mission. Indigo, Mandy, and B.B. help a hermit crab that's stuck in a lotion container from dying of chemical poisoning. Indigo is very determined to finish their mission and leave the polluted beach, but after the rangers help with the cleanup, she realizes that reusing and recycling is much better than simply throwing away everything unwanted.
6	6	"Rangers Raise a Condor"	Michael Maliani & Sean Scott	Sara Jane Sluke & Hilary Cherniss	November 13, 2018	111	N/A
6	6	"Pony Party"	Michael Maliani & Sean Scott	Hilary Cherniss & Sara Jane Sluke	November 13, 2018	111	N/A
Anna, Bonnie Blueberry, and Lavender help a baby California condor get back to its nest after it gets knocked out by a drone. The pilot is later revealed to be Patty Praxton, who wasn't being careful with the drone. The problem now is returning the baby to the nest... without being near it. Anna, Pepper, and B.B. save a filly in New Jersey from a sandstorm and reunite it with her mother. After saving it, they find that the island's entire pony population ate the land clear of grass, and set off to find them a new home with plenty.
7	7	"Land Ho"	Michael Maliani & Sean Scott	Aaron Simpson	November 14, 2018	109	0.24
7	7	"The Strongest Spider"	Michael Maliani & Sean Scott	Gus Constantellis	November 14, 2018	109	0.24
Pepper, Indigo, and Anna head to the Pacific Ocean to save Preston and Patty from an ocean storm, discovering a new island in the process. Ufortunately, they are trapped by the Praxtons soon after, and quickly discover that the island house a very much active volcano. Pepper, Mandy, and Lavender help a mama Madagascar pochard find her babies, but Lavender is afraid of spiders and refuses to be near one, causing many problems until they find help from a darwin's bark spider with super strong spider silk.
8	8	"Rabbit Roundup"	Michael Maliani & Sean Scott	Jay J. Demopoulos	November 15, 2018	105	0.30
8	8	"Uninvited Guest"	Michael Maliani & Sean Scott	Sara Jane Sluke & Hilary Cherniss	November 15, 2018	105	0.30
Rosie, Lavender, and Bonnie Blueberry help remove invasive rabbits from an Australian farm owned by Preston Praxton, who bought them as pets for his daughter Patty. Unfortunately, he refuses their help on a constant basis and things get worse when Patty releases a European cat. Rosie, Mandy, and Pepper have to help an alligator in Daytona Beach who has lost its home environment and ended up sleeping in Preston Praxton's swimming pool, but his trap ends up letting him and Patty set off the creature's ferocity with the rangers borderline helpless, even more so when they find out about his encroachment neighborhood.
9	9	"Duck Duck Oops"	Michael Maliani & Sean Scott	Hilary Cherniss & Sara Jane Sluke	November 16, 2018	107	N/A
9	9	"Lost Island"	Michael Maliani & Sean Scott	Peter Hunziker	November 16, 2018	107	N/A
Pepper, Anna, and Bonnie Blueberry help ducks in California who are sinking in a rapidly draining pond, but after transferring them they find that Preston Praxton is draining all the ponds and lakes in the area to water a golf course, and he won't let anyone stop him. Rosie, Anna, and Lavender help a bunch of shrews find a new home after their island in the Maldives sinks underwater. The shrews, though, are determined to remain in their original home, but this only causes severe problems for everyone involved.
10	10	"Flash Flood"	Michael Maliani & Sean Scott	Peter Hunziker	January 6, 2019	110	0.46
10	10	"Steer Me in the Right Direction"	Michael Maliani & Sean Scott	Ariel Shepherd-Oppenheim	January 6, 2019	110	0.46
Rosie, Pepper, and Indigo help gorillas in Tanzania hit by a flash flood reunite somewhere safe, but the flood proves to be too dangerous and the gorillas are in further trouble, especially after one wrong throw sends them into the water. Rosie, Indigo, and Bonnie Blueberry go to Wyoming to try & save a pair of cows from a wildfire. The only problem is the cows won't go towards the fire, and they resist almost every attempt the rangers make to save them, and Indigo is reluctant to accept help from cattle dogs.
11	11	"The Case of the Missing Class Pet"	Michael Maliani & Sean Scott	Jay J. Demopoulos; Story by : Gray Davis	January 13, 2019	112	0.44
11	11	"Bee Safe"	Michael Maliani & Sean Scott	Michael Stokes	January 13, 2019	112	0.44
Indigo, Lavender, and Bonnie B. head to Henderson, Nevada try to save a missing class pet chameleon in a vacant lot near the school yard. Unfortunately, they find that the area is full of hungry raccoons, and the chameleon could be an easy snack. Lavender, Bonnie Blueberry, and Anna help save a farm in Zambia from crop-raiding elephants. They set off to take the elephants to an oasis, but the large mammals seem more willing to take the crops, forcing the others to think of a plan. Note: The episode" Bee Safe" takes place after the events of the episode "Bee Like Lavender" because in that episode, Lavender was scared of bees but in the episode, Bee Safe, Lavender isn’t scared of bees anymore.
12	12	"Chimp in Kaleidoscopia"	Michael Maliani & Sean Scott	Sara Jane Sluke & Hilary Cherniss	January 20, 2019	113	0.35
12	12	"Pigeon Problems"	Michael Maliani & Sean Scott	Aaron Simpson	January 20, 2019	113	0.35
Anna, Pepper, and Indigo try to find a home for Earnest the circus chimpanzee. However, his human-raised background means he won't survive in the wild easily, and he is having problems learning the needed skills to live far from civilization. Additionally, he has instincts that prevent him from living with humans. Lavender, Anna, and Bonnie Blueberry head to New York to help a pigeon make a special delivery for his owner's granddaughter. They find out he is being confused by solar storms, and set off with him to help deliver his message.
13	13	"Henpecked"	Michael Maliani & Sean Scott	Sara Jane Sluke & Hilary Cherniss	January 27, 2019	114	0.45
13	13	"Rangers in Space"	Michael Maliani & Sean Scott	Peter Hunziker	January 27, 2019	114	0.45
Rosie, Anna, and Bonnie Blueberry head to Alabama to help a number of chickens that are severely stressed. Despite the fact that it is extremely hilarious, they find that the chickens are having problems with their cramped spaces and that Preston Praxton is the main cause to maximize profits, and he stubbornly refuses to give them more space. Rosie, Bonnie Blueberry, and Indigo save a satellite from Preston and Patty's space shuttle, which is very poorly maintained and slowly falling apart. Unfortunately, Preston severely overestimates his shuttle's condition, and the rangers are forced to take drastic measures.
14	14	"What a Gas"	Michael Maliani & Sean Scott	Sara Jane Sluke & Hilary Cherniss	February 3, 2019	115	0.35
14	14	"Turtle Trek"	Michael Maliani & Sean Scott	Aaron Simpson	February 3, 2019	115	0.35
Anna, B.B., and Lavender help cows in Kansas that are wearing odd tanks to collect their burps. Upon removing them, they find that Preston Praxton was the tanks to provide power to his farm with methane emissions from cow burps and he won't see the rangers' side of the argument. Rosie, Mandy, and Bonnie Blueberry help a baby sea turtle in Florida find his way to the ocean after it follows the light of Preston Praxton's beach estate instead of that from the moon. Unfortunately, their attempts are constantly thwarted by nature.
15	15	"Tornado Hunters"	Michael Maliani & Sean Scott	Ariel Shepherd-Oppenheim	February 10, 2019	116	0.27
15	15	"The Air Up There"	Michael Maliani & Sean Scott	Hilary Cherniss & Sara Jane Sluke	February 10, 2019	116	0.27
Anna, Lavender, and Bonnie Blueberry try to save Preston and Patty from a tornado while the Praxtons are storm-chasing. Preston in particular is willing to ignore all safety precautions about tornadoes just for the sake of the perfect pictures, and he refuses to get to safety, endangering himself and everyone else. Bonnie Blueberry, Indigo, and Lavender try to clear the air of a polluted city in California so that everyone can breathe properly. The culprit turns out to be Preston Praxton and he consistently denies the pollution is even existing.
16	16	"Dust in the Wind"	Michael Maliani & Sean Scott	Ariel Shepherd-Oppenheim	February 17, 2019	117	0.37
16	16	"Catch a Tiger"	Michael Maliani & Sean Scott	Sara Jane Sluke & Hilary Cherniss	February 17, 2019	117	0.37
Rosie, Indigo, and Bonnie Blueberry save a family of javelinas in New Mexico from an intense desert dust storm. After reuniting them, the group now have to find them a safe place in the storm, but the storm's strong winds make staying inside very tricky. Anna, Pepper, and Bonnie Blueberry help save a Javan tiger in West Sulawesi thought to be extinct from a booby trap set by Preston Praxton, who plans on using him for publicity purposes. Unfortunately, the tiger cannot understand Anna and Preston is determined to keep him, making a large amount of difficulty for the mission.
17	17	"A Hot Topic"	Michael Maliani & Sean Scott	Ariel Shepherd-Oppenheim	May 5, 2019	118	0.27
17	17	"Giant Catfish"	Michael Maliani & Sean Scott	Aaron Simpson	May 5, 2019	118	0.27
Anna, Bonnie Blueberry, and Lavender help to save the unique animals at a hydrothermal vent in the Pacific Ocean threatened by an undersea mining operation. After helping a white octopus from a rockslide, they have to deal with a blocked vent, but not all of the animals can move to a new home. Anna, Bonnie Blueberry, and Pepper head to Thailand to rescue a giant catfish stuck in shallow waters full of litter. Unfortunately, its gargantuan size and weight makes moving it extremely difficult for the rangers.
18	18	"Prairie Dog Day Afternoon"	Michael Maliani & Sean Scott	Sara Jane Sluke & Hilary Cherniss	June 2, 2019	119	0.29
18	18	"We Didn't Start the Fire Ants"	Michael Maliani & Sean Scott	Hilary Cherniss & Sara Jane Sluke	June 2, 2019	119	0.29
B.B., Rosie, and Indigo head to Wyoming & try to save some prairie dogs, a keystone species, after Patty Praxton paves over their burrows and traps them under a large expanse of concrete meant for a skate park. To make matters worse, Indigo is more focused on skating and she ends up making the problem worse when it turns out she is covering more than just prairie dog burrows. B.B., Indigo, and Lavender help a little kangaroo in Queensland who is stung by invasive fire ants. Kangaroo healed, they now have to get the fire ants back to South America- a much more difficult tasked than originally planned.
19	19	"Look Out Lemur"	Michael Maliani & Sean Scott	Sara Jane Sluke & Hilary Cherniss	June 30, 2019	120	0.24
19	19	"Don't Move a Mussel"	Michael Maliani & Sean Scott	Dawn Ius	June 30, 2019	120	0.24
Mandy, Pepper, and Indigo help a baby ring-tailed lemur who is caught in a flash flood. After saving him from the water, they now have to find a way to convince Preston Praxton to change how he is farming to stop erosion- which is easier said than done. Anna, Bonnie Blueberry, and Indigo must round up invasive zebra mussels that Preston Praxton brought to Okanagan Lake irresponsibly from the Great Lakes after breaking regulations in boating. The group has to stop Preston's carelessness before he can potentially harm the Ogopogo.
20	20	"Praxton Islands, Inc."	Michael Maliani & Sean Scott	Peter Hunziker	August 4, 2019	121	0.32
20	20	"Get the Lead Out"	Michael Maliani & Sean Scott	Marion McNabb	August 4, 2019	121	0.32
Rosie, Lavender, and Anna head to Dubai & deal with issues from the construction of artificial islands created by Preston Praxton as a part of a long scheme of attracting potential vacationers. The process is kicking up a lot of silt, but Praxton won't see the damage he's doing. Bonnie Blueberry, Lavender, and Indigo head to Saginaw, Michigan to save a family and their neighbors from lead in their home water supply. The underground pipes have been found to be corroded, and the rangers must hurry before the problem gets worse.
21	21	"The Tortoise and the Heiress"	Michael Maliani & Sean Scott	Aaron Simpson	September 1, 2019	123	N/A
21	21	"Getting Swampy"	Michael Maliani & Sean Scott	Sara Jane Sluke & Hilary Cherniss	September 1, 2019	123	N/A
Indigo, Rosie, and Bonnie Blueberry help free a tortoise in Nevada from rocks after being buried by careless driving on the Praxtons' part. Preston refuses to abide by the rules already set, forcing the rangers to be creative in their approach. Rosie, Mandy, and Pepper head to Borneo & help put out a fire in a colony of orangutans' home near a swamp. The team then discovers that the fires were caused by peat embers and the swamp is almost practically dry as Preston Praxton built an abandoned canal for logging purposes.
22	22	"The Otter and the Oil"	Michael Maliani & Sean Scott	Peter Hunziker	September 15, 2019	124	0.32
22	22	"Icebreakers"	Michael Maliani & Sean Scott	Ariel Shepherd-Oppenheim	September 15, 2019	124	0.32
Indigo, Lavender, and Bonnie Blueberry have to go to Louisiana to save an otter from an oil slick, and its cleanup proves to be very tricky and messy. Indigo, Mandy, and Rosie have to save a pod of orcas trapped in ice in Sakhalin. The problem is that every attempt is thwarted by the freezing water, and the hole only gets smaller as time grows on.
23	23	"Coral Calamity"	Michael Maliani & Sean Scott	Jay J. Demopoulos	September 22, 2019	122	0.38
23	23	"S'no Problem"	Michael Maliani & Sean Scott	Hilary Cherniss & Sara Jane Sluke	September 22, 2019	122	0.38
Rosie, Anna, and Lavender save a coral reef near New Caledonia from losing its color after Preston Praxton carelessly prances around on them not knowing coral is alive. The hard part is letting him know the truth, and he refuses to believe that coral can live. Rosie, Bonnie, and Indigo go to Colorado & save Patty and Preston from an avalanche while the 2 are enjoying the snowy weather on a mountain. While Patty listens closely to the rangers, Preston is much less cooperative and threatens to put everyone at risk with his carelessness.
24	24	"A Whale of a Problem"	Michael Maliani & Sean Scott	Aaron Simpson	September 29, 2019	126	0.42
24	24	"Bee Like Lavender"	Michael Maliani & Sean Scott	Gus Constantellis	September 29, 2019	126	0.42
Rosie, Bonnie Blueberry, and Mandy have to go to the Galapagos Islands to save a whale who is beached on the shore, but no matter how many times Rosie sends him back in the sea, the whale always ends up back on dry land. They eventually find that the whale is scared by Preston's submarine sonar and he won't believe their words and refuses to shut off the sonar. Bonnie Blueberry, Indigo, and Lavender have to go to Washington to save sick bees and an apple orchard from Preston's pesticides. In addition to trying to stop Preston, the group also have to convince Lavender to help out, as she is very scared of bees. Note: This episode is set before the episode "Bee Safe" because in this episode Lavender was scared of bees. In the episode "Bee Safe", Lavender is no longer scared of bees.
25	25	"Monkey Business"	Michael Maliani & Sean Scott	Dan Danko	September 29, 2019	125	0.35
25	25	"Lost Panda Cub"	Michael Maliani & Sean Scott	Aaron Simpson	September 29, 2019	125	0.35
The Rangers have to go to the Amazon Rainforest save a pygmy marmoset that Preston has captured as a pet for Patty, but the only problem is that the marmoset has no intention of living in captivity, and the Praxtons are not willing to give him up. B.B., Lavender, and Mandy have to help a lost giant panda cub get home. The problem is that they can't let him see them, and a snow leopard is stalking them to try an get a meal.
26	26	"Divided We Fall"	Michael Maliani & Sean Scott	Dan Danko	TBA	108	TBD
26	26	"White-Nosed Bats"	Michael Maliani & Sean Scott	Gus Constantellis	TBA	108	TBD
Anna, Rosie, and BB save an elephant family in Zambia from a poacher determined to take the mother's tusks, but the group is divided when Anna prioritizes the baby while the others go for the mother, landing the mission at extreme risk. Rosie, Mandy, and Bonnie Blueberry go to Illinois & try to help a horse escape constant agonizing bites from several mosquitoes. Coming to the conclusion that there are too many insects due to there being no bats around to eat them, Rosie refuses to look for them, being severely afraid of bats. Things get complicated when they find out the bats have white nose disease, and Rosie is refusing to touch them.

=== Season 2 (2019–21) ===
No. overall	No. in season	Title	Directed by	Written by	Original release date	Prod. code	U.S. viewers (millions)
27	1	"The Earth Needs Their Kelp"	Michael Maliani & Sean Scott	Hilary Cherniss & Sara Jane Sluke	October 6, 2019	201	0.27
27	1	"Iceberg Ahead"	Michael Maliani & Sean Scott	Michael J. Beall	October 6, 2019	201	0.27
Rosie, B.B. and Indigo must return balance to an ocean environment in the Pacific In the Arctic, A large iceberg calves, leaving a floe on a collision course for a clan of polar bears. Anna, Indigo, and Rosie must save them.
28	2	"Backyard Bird Feeder"	Michael Maliani & Sean Scott	Marion McNabb	October 13, 2019	202	0.30
28	2	"If You Can't Stand the Heat"	Michael Maliani & Sean Scott	Hilary Cherniss & Sara Jane Sluke	October 13, 2019	202	0.30
in Baja California Sur, Patty's backyard feeder is too close to a glass window, and Anna, Lavender and B.B. need to find another way to safely feed the birds. When Rosie, Bonnie Blueberry and Mandy act to save animals in California from a forest fire, they jump the gun and accidentally put out a controlled burn.
29	3	"Moo-ving Cows"	Michael Maliani & Sean Scott	Marion McNabb	October 20, 2019	203	0.43
29	3	"Panda-monium"	Michael Maliani & Sean Scott	Cynthia Riddle	October 20, 2019	203	0.43
Rosie, Pepper and Mandy have to go to British Columbia & stop Preston Praxton from poisoning a stream with pesticides. Anna, Indigo and Rosie work to reunite and relocate a family of giant pandas when their home environment is destroyed.
30	4	"The Big Dig"	Michael Maliani & Sean Scott	Marion McNabb	November 3, 2019	204	0.32
30	4	"Catalog Slog"	Michael Maliani & Sean Scott	Sara Jane Sluke & Hilary Cherniss	November 3, 2019	204	0.32
Rosie, Anna, and Lavender discover that Preston Praxton has been causing earthquakes in Colorado by digging underground. In Kansas City, Preston sends out big, thick catalogs that overflow landfills and Rosie, Pepper, and Lavender must stop him.
31	5	"Preston Fest"	Michael Maliani & Sean Scott	Hilary Cherniss & Sara Jane Sluke	November 10, 2019	205	0.29
31	5	"Snakes on a Plain"	Michael Maliani & Sean Scott	Michael J. Beall	November 10, 2019	205	0.29
Preston throws a music festival in British Columbia that destroys all the local vegetation, threatening local wildlife who are now going hungry and Mandy, Bonnie Blueberry and Lavender have to do something. Rosie, Mandy and Anna help protect the lives of snakes in Wisconsin during their migration.
32	6	"Big Gold Superbloom"	Michael Maliani & Sean Scott	Sara Jane Sluke & Hilary Cherniss	November 17, 2019	206	0.29
32	6	"Batter Up"	Michael Maliani & Sean Scott	Marion McNabb	November 17, 2019	206	0.29
In Rural California, a Farmer's Wildflowers are being destroyed, causing tomato worms to devour the crops on a nearby farm. Anna, Indigo and Lavender must save the day. Bonnie Blueberry, Indigo and Lavender need to go to Quebec & prevent bats from colliding with wind turbines.
33	7	"Missed Them by a Hare"	Michael Maliani & Sean Scott	Peter Hunziker	November 17, 2019	207	0.26
33	7	"Drone Zone"	Michael Maliani & Sean Scott	Gus Constantellis	November 17, 2019	207	0.26
Climate change causes snow to melt prematurely, leaving a family of snow hares in Idaho vulnerable to predators. Anna, Rosie and Pepper must protect them. Bonnie Blueberry, Lavender and Pepper attempt to save a bear cub in British Columbia stuck on the side of a mountain.
34	8	"Marshland Chronicles"	Michael Maliani & Sean Scott	Sara Jane Sluke & Hilary Cherniss	November 24, 2019	208	0.35
34	8	"Otterly Lost"	Michael Maliani & Sean Scott	Kristin Jarrett	November 24, 2019	208	0.35
At a Marshland near Louisiana, A spring morning snowstorm is followed by an abrupt afternoon warm-up, causing a flood of melted snow that threatens the local wildlife. In the Bering Sea near the Kamchatka Peninsula, An otter loses her favorite rock.
35	9	"Tigertastic"	Michael Maliani & Sean Scott	Hilary Cherniss & Sara Jane Sluke	December 1, 2019	209	0.31
35	9	"Seal Gone Wild"	Michael Maliani & Sean Scott	Gus Constantellis	December 1, 2019	209	0.31
Preston destroys mangrove forests in India to create profitable shrimp farms, exposing the area and its wildlife to storms, and Pepper, Indigo, and Lavender must do something to stop him. Mandy, Bonnie Blueberry, and Lavender have to get a lost seal back home after it wreaks havoc on a city in South Australia.
36	10	"Chimney Caper"	Michael Maliani & Sean Scott	Marion McNabb	December 8, 2019	213	0.34
36	10	"Smuggle a Snuggle"	Michael Maliani & Sean Scott	Hilary Cherniss & Sara Jane Sluke	December 8, 2019	213	0.34
During the holidays, Rosie, Bonnie Blueberry and Lavender need to remove a raccoon family looking for warmth that becomes trapped in Preston's chimney. Patty smuggles sugar gliders from Australia to give as "party favors" at her birthday party back in Louisiana and Anna, Indigo and Lavender need to do something.
37	11	"Frozen Falls"	Michael Maliani & Sean Scott	Peter Hunziker	December 15, 2019	212	0.27
37	11	"Got Silk?"	Michael Maliani & Sean Scott	Michael J. Beall	December 15, 2019	212	0.27
Rosie, Mandy, and Bonnie Blueberry save turtles in Ontario trapped on an ice floe when a waterfall freezes over, but their save has consequences. Lavender, Indigo, and Pepper head for Madagascar to save spiders from the Praxtons, who are silking them for their silk.
38	12	"Flyaway"	Michael Maliani & Sean Scott	Marion McNabb	December 15, 2019	210	0.27
38	12	"Safari Soulmates"	Michael Maliani & Sean Scott	Hilary Cherniss & Sara Jane Sluke	December 15, 2019	210	0.27
In Wyoming, The Praxtons use helium balloons to try and set a world record, so Rosie, Mandy and Lavender must stop them. In Botswana, the symbiotic relationship between ostriches and zebras is threatened when Preston rounds up ostriches for his own profit. So Anna, Pepper and Indigo must stop him.
39	13	"Spooky Costume Party"	Michael Maliani & Sean Scott	Aaron Simpson	October 11, 2020	211	0.27
39	13	"GMO OMG"	Michael Maliani & Sean Scott	Kristin Jarrett	October 11, 2020	211	0.27
Bonnie Blueberry, Lavender, and Mandy help Patty with an eco-friendly spooky costume party. Mandy, Anna and B.B. head for a city in Missouri when Preston's genetically-modified crops go crazy.
40	14	"The Lost Puppy"	Michael Maliani & Sean Scott	Gus Constantellis	October 18, 2020	214	0.25
40	14	"Goats in Trees"	Michael Maliani & Sean Scott	Sara Jane Sluke & Hilary Cherniss	October 18, 2020	214	0.25
Rosie, Anna and Pepper head for Orlando, Florida to save a lost puppy that is stuck in a city sewer system. In Morocco, Priscilla Praxton removes pesky seed-spitting tree goats from her orchard. Mandy, Anna and Pepper must save these goats.
41	15	"Team Rainbow Rangers!"	Michael Maliani & Sean Scott	Kristin Jarrett	October 25, 2020	216	0.15
41	15	"Wingin' It"	Michael Maliani & Sean Scott	Michael J. Beall	October 25, 2020	216	0.15
Pepper, Indigo, and Lavender have to stop a factory in New Mexico from pouring rainbow color in the river. Lavender, Anna, and B.B. help a physically challenged duckling in Washington fly, so it can catch up to its migrating flock.
42	16	"Whale of a Tale"	Michael Maliani & Sean Scott	Marion McNabb	November 1, 2020	217	0.24
42	16	"Construction Destruction"	Michael Maliani & Sean Scott	Aaron Simpson	November 1, 2020	217	0.24
When heavy boat traffic in the North Atlantic Ocean disrupts a migrating whale and her calf, Anna, B.B., and Mandy must keep them safe. Indigo, Anna, and Pepper save a coral reef near Mexico from being damaged by a reckless construction team.
43	17	"Chimp in the Wild"	Michael Maliani & Sean Scott	Sara Jane Sluke & Hilary Cherniss	November 8, 2020	218	0.17
43	17	"Shake It"	Michael Maliani & Sean Scott	Gus Constantellis	November 8, 2020	218	0.17
Anna, Pepper, and Indigo head to Central Africa check whether their chimpanzee friend Ernest is ready to return to the wild. After a terrible earthquake in Arkansas, Mandy, Pepper, and Lavender try to save a group of ducks.
44	18	"Gold in That Thar Moon"	Michael Maliani & Sean Scott	Peter Hunziker	November 15, 2020	219	0.25
44	18	"Gem of a Friend"	Michael Maliani & Sean Scott	Michael Beall	November 15, 2020	219	0.25
Preston's gold mining mission on the Moon is endangering gorillas on Earth, and the Rosie, B.B. and Indigo must stop him. Rosie, Lavender, and Anna must save Floof after Preston captures him in Dubai.
45	19	"Bunny Buddies"	Michael Maliani & Sean Scott	Dawn Ius	November 22, 2020	220	0.22
45	19	"I Wasn't Borneo Yesterday"	Michael Maliani & Sean Scott	Cynthia Riddle	November 22, 2020	220	0.22
Mandy, B.B., and Lavender save pet bunnies in Washington that have been let out into the wild. Rosie, Mandy, and Pepper work to solve problems with a palm oil plantation in Borneo.
46	20	"Teacup Tigers"	Michael Maliani & Sean Scott	Kristin Jarrett & Maureen Macomber	November 29, 2020	221	0.24
46	20	"Glass Warfare"	Michael Maliani & Sean Scott	Michael Beall	November 29, 2020	221	0.24
Anna, Pepper, and Bonnie Blueberry save tigers in West Sulawesi from Preston who is trying to catch them for Patty's tea party. When Priscilla turns a desert in Arizona to glass and creates sandstorms, Rosie, Indigo, and Bonnie Blueberry have to stop her.
47	21	"Who Said Bat"	Michael Maliani & Sean Scott	Marion McNabb	December 6, 2020	222	0.27
47	21	"What's Mine is Mine"	Michael Maliani & Sean Scott	Kayla Harris	December 6, 2020	222	0.27
Bonnie Blueberry, Indigo and Lavender need to head back to Quebec & prevent bats from flying into wind turbines… …again. Pollution from a gold mine in Louisiana once again threatens the sea otters in the ocean.
48	22	"Green is the New Black"	Michael Maliani & Sean Scott	Sara Jane Sluke & Hilary Cherniss	December 13, 2020	223	0.27
48	22	"Plastic Bottle Island"	Michael Maliani & Sean Scott	Cynthia Riddle	December 13, 2020	223	0.27
In Rural Pennsylvania, Microfibers from Preston's new fashion line causes environmental problems in the ocean. But Rosie, Pepper and Lavender have to stop him. A bottle-nosed dolphin in the South Pacific Ocean gets a plastic six-pack ring stuck on its nose and mouth. But Mandy, Indigo and B.B they have to cleaning.
49	23	"Calling Fowl"	Michael Maliani & Sean Scott	Marion McNabb	December 27, 2020	224	0.18
49	23	"Treehouse Trouble"	Michael Maliani & Sean Scott	Hilary Cherniss & Sara Jane Sluke	December 27, 2020	224	0.18
In Nevada, Pepper, Anna, and Bonnie Blueberry discover Preston Praxton is feeding ducks to keep them off his golf course. In Utah, Preston is harvesting trees so Patty can build her massive dream treehouse, but it's destroying the forest. So Rosie, Bonnie Blueberry and Lavender are sent to stop him.
50	24	"Car Wash"	Michael Maliani & Sean Scott	Marion McNabb	January 3, 2021	225	0.18
50	24	"Preston's Shipwreck"	Michael Maliani & Sean Scott	Peter Hunziker	January 3, 2021	225	0.18
In British Columbia, Preston is washing his car in his orchard. The runoff from the chemicals in the soap is polluting the riverbed and harming animals, so Rosie, Pepper, and Mandy are sent to fix this. In New Caledonia, Preston's determination to find treasure in a pirate shipwreck threatens an inter-marine species, so Rosie, Anna, and Lavender are sent to stop him.
51	25	"Wild, Wild Horses"	Michael Maliani & Sean Scott	Cynthia Riddle	January 10, 2021	226	0.17
51	25	"Safari Away from Me"	Michael Maliani & Sean Scott	Marion McNabb	January 10, 2021	226	0.17
Preston's latest get-rich-quick scheme to sell wild mustangs from Wyoming goes awry when Anna, Pepper, and B.B. set out to reunite them. In Angola, A man causes a baby elephant to become separated from her mother. Anna, Rosie and B.B. set out to stop him.
52	26	"Bunny-20"	TBA	Michael Beall	TBA	215	TBD
Kalia sends all The Rainbow Rangers to find a cure for all the sick bunnies by helping Dr. Marissa and Dr. Brandon while having to content with Preston. Guest-starring Pierce Brosnan as Dr. Brandon

=== Season 3 (2022) ===
No. overall	No. in season	Title	Directed by	Written by	Original release date	Prod. code	U.S. viewers (millions)
53	1	"Scents and Sensibility"	Unknown	Sara Jane Sluke & Hilary Cherniss	April 15, 2022	301	N/A
53	1	"Smell You Later"	Unknown	Hilary Cherniss & Sara Jane Sluke	April 15, 2022	301	N/A
54	2	"Croaking In The Rain"	Unknown	Sara Jane Sluke & Hilary Cherniss	April 15, 2022	302	N/A
54	2	"Hoots on First"	Unknown	Hilary Cherniss & Sara Jane Sluke	April 15, 2022	302	N/A
55	3	"Glitter Litter"	Unknown	Sara Jane Sluke & Hilary Cherniss	April 15, 2022	303	N/A
55	3	"Hitchhiker's Guide to Kaleidoscopia"	Unknown	Hilary Cherniss & Sara Jane Sluke	April 15, 2022	303	N/A
56	4	"The Cowardly Mountain Lion"	Unknown	Sara Jane Sluke & Hilary Cherniss	April 15, 2022	304	N/A
56	4	"Burro Bonanza"	Unknown	Hilary Cherniss & Sara Jane Sluke	April 15, 2022	304	N/A
57	5	"Why So Crabby?"	Unknown	Sara Jane Sluke & Hilary Cherniss	April 15, 2022	305	N/A
57	5	"Surprise! It's A... Forest Fire"	Unknown	Hilary Cherniss & Sara Jane Sluke	April 15, 2022	305	N/A
58	6	"Peek-A-Boo Beluga"	Unknown	Sara Jane Sluke & Hilary Cherniss	April 15, 2022	306	N/A
58	6	"You Are My Sunshine"	Unknown	Michael Beall	April 15, 2022	306	N/A
59	7	"Tiny Rocket Man"	Unknown	N/A	April 15, 2022	307	N/A
59	7	"Undercover Manatee"	Unknown	N/A	April 15, 2022	307	N/A
60	8	"Flying Beavers"	Unknown	N/A	April 15, 2022	308	N/A
60	8	"Let's Stick Together"	Unknown	N/A	April 15, 2022	308	N/A
61	9	"Hungry Hungry Hamsters"	Unknown	N/A	April 15, 2022	309	N/A
61	9	"Shock the Sloth"	Unknown	N/A	April 15, 2022	309	N/A
62	10	"Ape Escape"	Unknown	N/A	April 15, 2022	310	N/A
62	10	"Mining Your Own Business"	Unknown	N/A	April 15, 2022	310	N/A

== Production ==
In September 2016, Genius Brands announced that they were partnering with The Lion King and Flypaper director Rob Minkoff and Frozen writer Shane Morris on their new Rainbow Rangers series. The show premiered on the Nick Jr. Channel on November 5, 2018.

Early designs had the Rangers looking much more stylized than their finalized versions, with minor variations in their powers and personalities, and the original villain was Acrimonia, Kalia's jealous younger sister, instead of Preston Praxton.

Nickelodeon has gained broadcast rights in the United States and Caribbean Basin regions. On April 23, 2019, it was announced that Nickelodeon would also be bringing the show to Latin America.

When the COVID-19 pandemic began to take effect, a special episode of the show was commissioned called "Bunny-20" that streamed online on December 18, 2020 with Pierce Brosnan as a guest voice actor. The episode's goal was to teach young children about ways to keep safe during the pandemic and make it understandable to viewers.

In 2021, the series was streamed on Netflix in late June/early July, though the episodes are shown in production order instead of broadcast order.
