= Talhan =

Talhan Talan
- village
- Location in Punjab, India Talhan (India)
- Coordinates: 31.3114°N 75.6708°E
- punjab. Country: India
- State: Punjab
- District: Jalandhar

Area
  - Total: 1.49 km^{2} (0.58 sq mi)

Population (2011)
  - Total: 2,940
  - Density: 1,970/km^{2} (5,110/sq mi)

Languages
  - Official: Punjabi
- Time zone: UTC+5:30 (IST)
- Vehicle registration: PB-
- Coastline: 0 kilometres (0 mi)

Talhan is a village in the Jalandhar district in Punjab, India, located near the Jalandhar Cantonment.

== Demographics ==
According to the 2001 Census, Talhan has a population of 2,946 people. The village covers 369 acres (1.49 km^{2}).

== Baba Shaheed Nihal Singh ==
Talhan is famous for its Shaheedi Jor Mela, which is held annually in the memory of Shaheed Baba Nihal Singh.

Baba Nihal Singh belonged to the neighbouring village of Dakoha. Baba Nihal Singh made pulleys for drinking water wells. He served the people by installing the pulleys at the base of the well. Local people believe that as the Baba was divine.

The people of Talhan constructed a samadhi shrine to commemorate his death. The shrine was looked after by the Baba Nihal Singh's associate, Harnam Singh. After Harnam Singh's death, the followers cremated him next to the Baba's Samadhi. The two shrines have now become a gurudwara, a place of worship in Sikhism.

An annual Mela is held in Jalandhar to mark the death anniversary, or "Barsi," of the Baba. During the event, sports such as kabaddi, volleyball, and tug-of-war take place, along with gatka, a form of martial arts associated with the Sikhs. The Mela is celebrated annually from June 3 to June 5.

== Talhan caste conflict ==
The Talhan caste conflict was an event concerning the assertion of Chamar rights in Punjab. In June 2003, a dispute between Chamars and Jat Sikhs in Talhan occurred when the Chamar community desired representation on the governing committee of the Shaheed Baba Nihal Singh gurdwara. Although the Dalits makes up 60% of the Talhan population, they were denied a share in the committee.

== Gallery ==
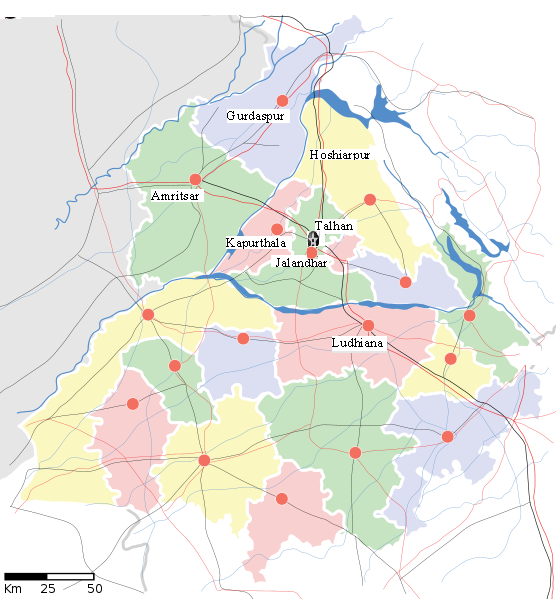
Talhan map

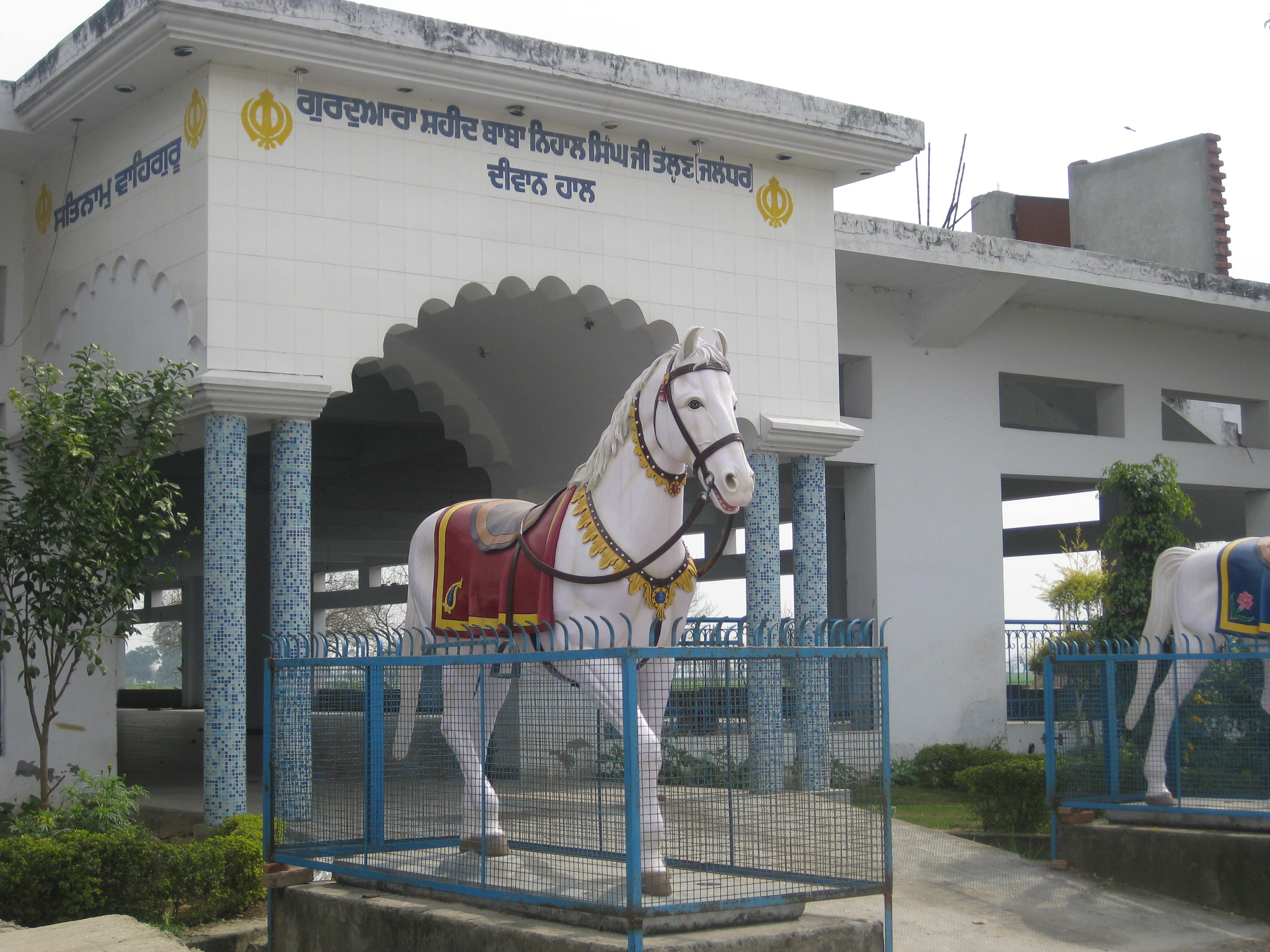
Talhan Baba Nihal Singh

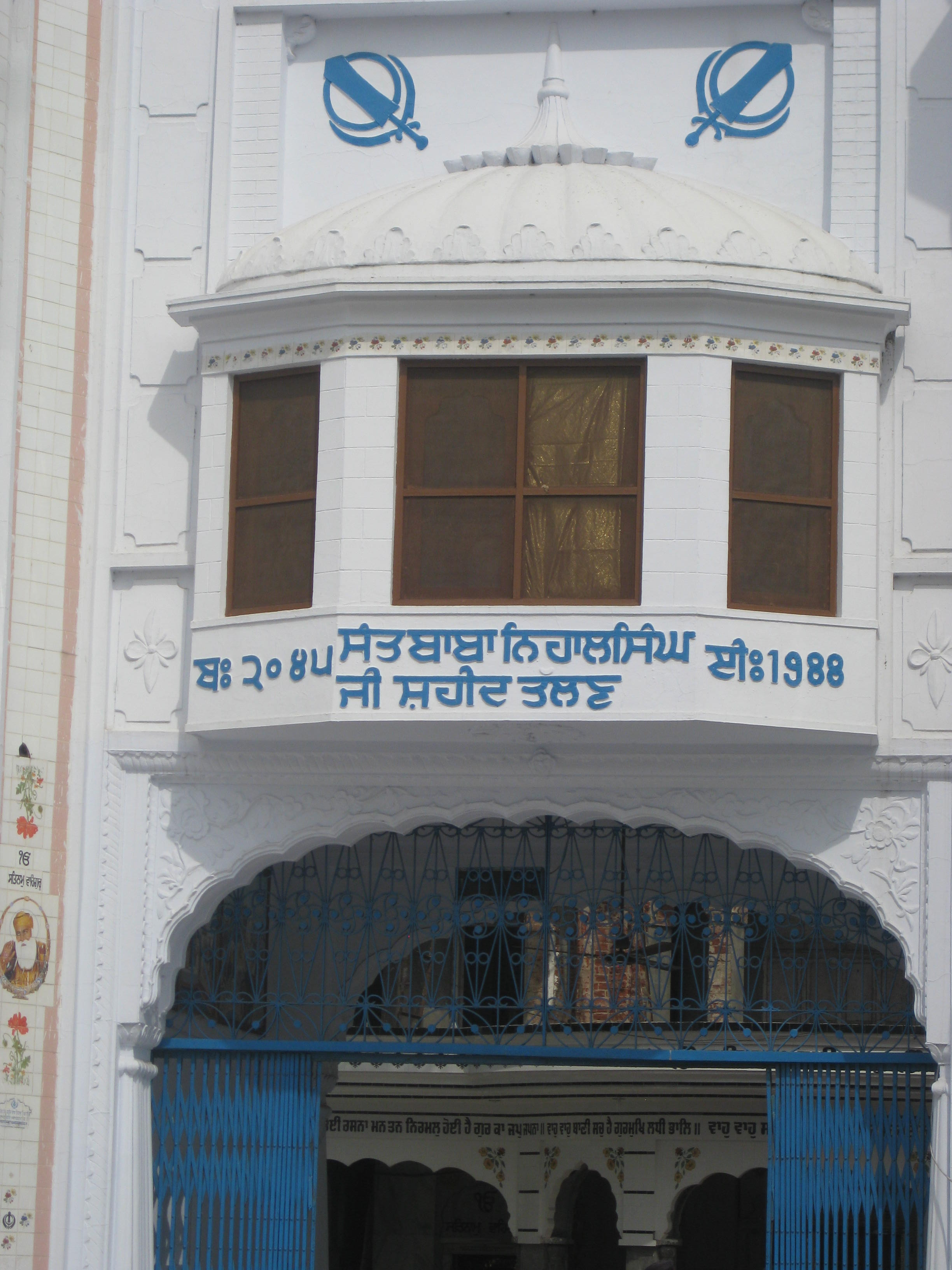
Talhan Baba Nihal Singh (Outside)

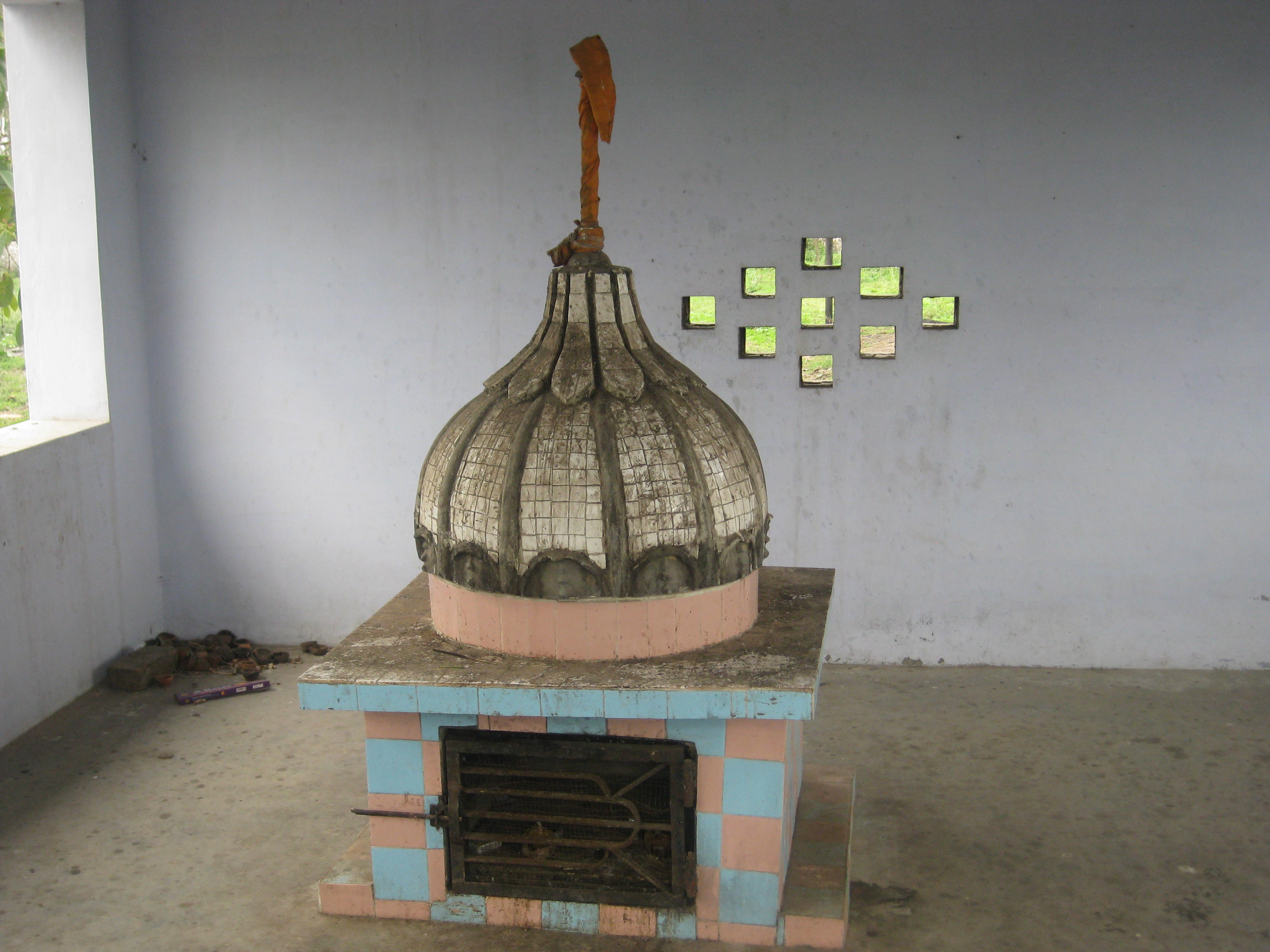
Talhan Masani Shrine

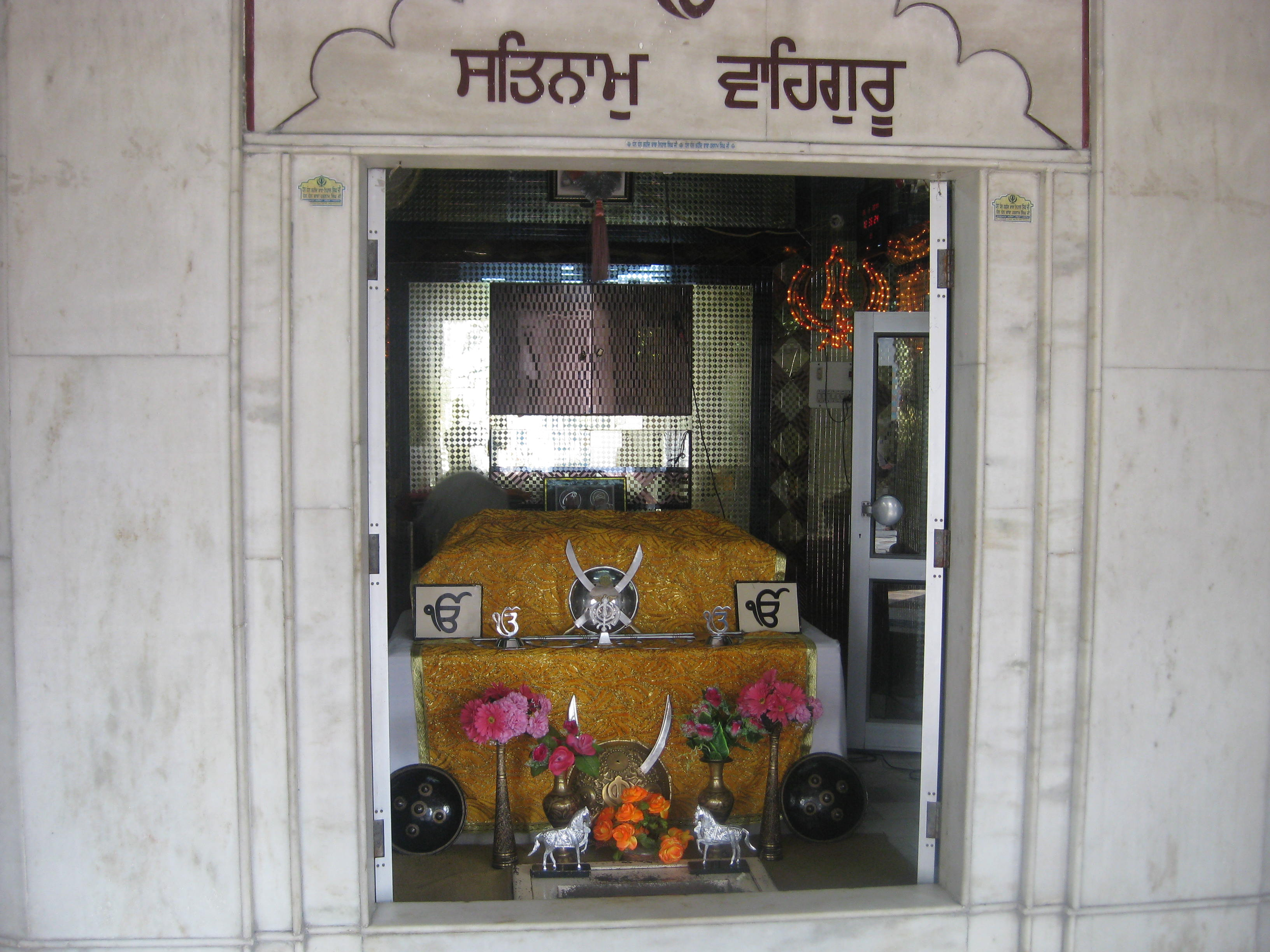
Talhan Baba Nihal Singh (Inside)

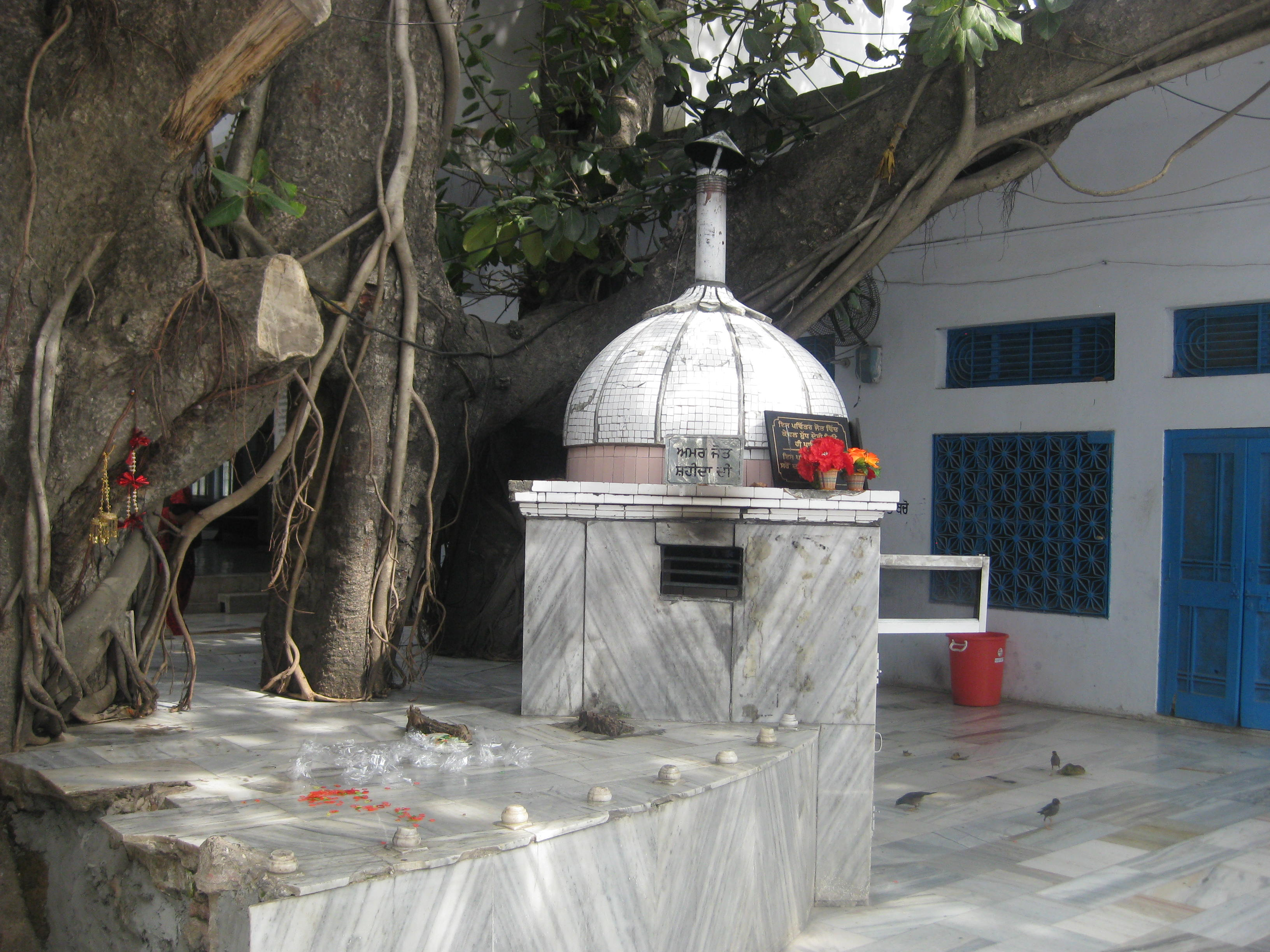
Talhan (inside) Baba Nihal SIngh
