= Ali Naqvi =

Ali Naqvi may refer to:

- Ali Naqi Naqvi, mujtahid from Lucknow, India
- Ali Naqvi (cricketer), Pakistani cricketer
- Syed Ali Naqi Naqvi Qumi, mujtahid from Lahore, Pakistan
- Mazahar Ali Akbar Naqvi (born 1960), Pakistani judge, former Justice of the Supreme Court of Pakistan
- Mohammed Ali Naqvi (born 1979), Pakistani filmmaker based in New York City
- Syed Sajid Ali Naqvi, Pakistani Shia scholar and founder of the Islami Tehreek Pakistan political party
- Zafar Ali Naqvi (born 1948), Indian politician

== See also ==
- Naqvi (disambiguation)
