= Syeda Shehrbano Naqvi =

Pakistani police officer

Syeda Shehrbano Naqvi سیدہ شہر بانو نقوی

Assistant Superintendent of Police (Punjab Police), Gulberg, Lahore

Personal details
- Born: 23 September 1998 (age 28) Faisalabad, Punjab, Pakistan
- Parents: Syed Hasnat Javed (father); Misbah Naqvi (mother)
- Education: Little Angels, Faisalabad (Primary); Beaconhouse School System (O-level); SICAS Girls, Gulberg, Lahore (A-level); University of the Punjab (BS Honours - Public Policy and Governance), (MPhil)

Syeda Shehrbano Naqvi (Urdu: سیدہ شہر بانو نقوی) is a Pakistani police officer who is serving as Assistant Superintendent of Police (ASP) in Gulberg area of Lahore.

== Early life and education ==
Naqvi was born to Syed Hasnat Javed and Misbah Naqvi in Faisalabad, Punjab, Pakistan. Her family originally belonged to the rural area of Okara District, also located in Punjab, Pakistan. She received her primary education from Little Angels in Faisalabad and completed her O-level from Beaconhouse School System. She completed her A-level from SICAS located in Gulberg area of Lahore. She attended University of the Punjab campus in Lahore to complete her BS Honours in Public Management, with a specialization in Public Policy and Governance. She also completed her MPhil from University of the Punjab, specializing in Public Policy and Governance, and Child Labour.

== Career ==
Her first police job was in Sadar area of Faisalabad which included Saandalbar, Sadar, and Thikriwala.

== Activities ==
She has actively advocated for the protection of the transgender community and animals from abuse. Furthermore, she has been encouraging young people to serve as ambassadors for Punjab Police in society.

She has pushed for the adoption of retired police sniffer dogs instead of euthanizing them, arguing that these dedicated canines, who have faithfully served for years, deserve a respectful retirement rather than a cruel fate. Naqvi has collaborated with animal rights organizations, resulting in a partnership with the NGO Justice for Dogs (JFK). Due to her efforts, retired police sniffer dogs and horses are now available for adoption rather than being euthanized.

Some of her initiative ideas included establishment of Tahafuz Markaz (Protection Centers) in entirety of Punjab, establishment of Police Museum in Lahore, and establishment of daycare centers for police employees.

== Recipient of award ==
Naqvi, intervened to protect a distressed woman from an agitated mob. She was awarded the prestigious Quaid-e-Azam Police Medal, the highest gallantry award.

In a widely circulated video online, Naqvi was observed attempting to diffuse a heated situation involving a group of Tehreek-e-Labbaik Pakistan (TLP) supporters who were reportedly agitated with a woman at a local eatery. The woman had been wearing attire adorned with Arabic script, which provoked offense among those present who mistakenly believed it to contain Quranic verses. Acting swiftly, Naqvi intervened and successfully shielded the woman from the crowd's hostility.

Chief Minister of Punjab, Maryam Nawaz praised her courage, wisdom and responsibility for saving the life of the woman.

Pakistan's Army Chief, General Asim Munir, also met with Naqvi and commended her professionalism in saving the woman's life.

== Royal reward from Saudi Arabia ==
Saudi ambassador to Pakistan Nawaf bin Said Al-Malki met her at the Saudi embassy. He appreciated her actions in saving a woman from a violent mob in Lahore’s Ichhra Market. Saudi ambassador told her that the Saudi royal family will bear the expenses of her travel with her family to Saudi Arabia as a royal guest.
