= Goal (2007 Hindi film) =

2007 Indian film by Vivek Agnihotri

- Theatrical release poster
- Directed by: Vivek Agnihotri
- Screenplay by: Rohit Malhotra; Vikramaditya Motwane
- Dialogues by: Anurag Kashyap; Rohit Malhotra
- Story by: Rohit Malhotra
- Produced by: Ronnie Screwvala
- Starring: John Abraham; Bipasha Basu; Arshad Warsi; Boman Irani
- Cinematography: Attar Singh Saini
- Edited by: Hemal Kothari
- Music by: Songs: Pritam; Score: Sanjoy Chowdhury
- Production company: UTV Motion Pictures
- Distributed by: UTV Motion Pictures
- Release date: 23 November 2007
- Running time: 167 minutes
- Country: India
- Language: Hindi
- Budget: ₹190 million
- Box office: ₹217.2 million

Goal (also known as Dhan Dhana Dhan Goal; transl. Get Set Goal) is a 2007 Indian Hindi-language sports drama film directed by Vivek Agnihotri and produced by Ronnie Screwvala under the banner UTV Motion Pictures. The film's premise is inspired by the real-life struggles of South Asian football players in the UK. It stars John Abraham, Bipasha Basu, Arshad Warsi, and Boman Irani.

Goal was released on 23 November 2007 to negative reviews from critics. The film was also screened in the Tous Les Cinémas du Monde (World Cinema) section of the 2007 Cannes Film Festival.

== Plot ==
Jaidev and Kavita Bhasin live a middle-class lifestyle in Southall, England, with their son Sunny.

In the mid-1980s, Jaidev supported the all-Asian Southall Football Club, which achieved considerable success. However, this success created hostility from rival Caucasian teams, leading to violent attacks on Jaidev and the club’s star player, Tony Singh. The incident led to the club’s downfall, and its ground was repurposed for weddings and parties.

Jaidev dreams of Sunny playing for Southall, but Sunny, who identifies as British, joins the Aston Football Club instead. During selections, Sunny is subjected to racism and sidelined. Frustrated, he eventually joins Southall United and, with Captain Shaan Ali Khan and Coach Tony Singh, helps the team reach the semi-finals. Sunny and Shaan initially don’t get along, but later sort their differences.

Just before a crucial match, Sunny betrays his teammates by signing with a prestigious club in exchange for money, a house, and a car. As a result, Southall’s ground is threatened with demolition to make way for a shopping mall. His community treats him with disdain for his betrayal.

Later, Sunny learns the truth about his father’s sacrifices and Southall’s history. Overcome with guilt, he cancels his contract, returns to Southall, and leads the team to victory in the final against Aston, redeeming himself in the eyes of his family, teammates, and community.

== Cast ==
- John Abraham as Sunny K. Bhasin
- Bipasha Basu as Dr. Rumana Ali Khan
- Arshad Warsi as Shaan Ali Khan, Rumana’s brother
- Zehra Naqvi as Jenny, Shaan’s wife
- Najia Khan as Shweta, Ranveer’s girlfriend
- Kushal Punjabi as Ranveer "Goalie" Chauhan
- Boman Irani as Tony Singh
- Shernaz Patel as Tony’s wife
- Dalip Tahil as Johny Bakshi
- Rajendranath Zutshi as Monty Singh
- Dibyendu Bhattacharya as Debashish "Debu"
- Shifu Kanishka as Southall footballer
- Saurabh Dubey as Jaidev Bhasin, Sunny’s father
- Natasha Sinha as Sunny’s mother
- Judan Ali as himself
- Ernest Ignasius as Mr. Dhariwahl
- Towsif Jahan as semi-professional footballer
- Sana Khan as item number performer in "Billo Rani"
- Ajay Kalyansingh as Southall United supporter

== Production ==
The film had the working title Goal until August 2007. Filming took place at Millwall F.C.’s stadium, The Den, where Abhishek Bachchan and Aishwarya Rai made a surprise visit to watch the shoot. Old Trafford is also featured in a sequence where Tony inspires the players with the story of the Munich air disaster and Manchester United’s resilience.

== Soundtrack ==
Goal

Soundtrack album by Pritam Chakraborty
- Released: 30 October 2007 (digital); 23 November 2007 (film release)
- Genre: Film soundtrack
- Label: T-Series
- Producer: Ronnie Screwvala

Pritam Chakraborty chronology
Life in a... Metro (2007)	Goal (2007)	Singh Is Kinng (2008)

Professional ratings
Review scores
Source	Rating
Music Review at IndiaFM.com	3/5 stars

The soundtrack was released in October 2007 and received a rating of 3 out of 5 from IndiaFM. The soundtrack was composed by Pritam, with lyrics written by Javed Akhtar. The background score was composed by Sanjoy Chowdhury.

Song	Singer(s)	Duration
"Billo Rani"	Anand Raj Anand, Richa Sharma	5:33
"Halla Bol"	Daler Mehndi	5:05
"Hey Dude"	Devrat	5:00
"Ishq Ka Kalma"	Neeraj Shridhar	4:44
"Tara Ru"	Javed	3:51
"Billo Rani (Remix)"	Anand Raj Anand, Richa Sharma	4:42

== Reception ==
Taran Adarsh of IndiaFM gave the film three out of five, noting, "On the whole, Goal has an ordinary first half, but the post-interval portions, especially the exhilarating climax, make up for it."

Raja Sen of Rediff.com gave it one star out of five, writing, "This film is a complete and utter drag, a case in point against derivative sports dramas, a trend threatening to grow after the success of films like Chak De! India and Iqbal."

Gautam Bhaskaran of The Hollywood Reporter criticized the writing. He further wrote, "The script is full of clichés. Must we continue to make Sikhs the butt of our jokes? Must British–Indian relations still hinge on inane terms like 'paki'? Would any sports commentator expose his designs on live television as Bakshi does? This is where Chak De! India succeeds with its neat, no-nonsense script."

Khalid Mohamed of Hindustan Times wrote, "The last 15 minutes whip up sufficient nationalist fervour. The championship finale is rigorously conceived and well-lensed by Attar Singh Saini. However, the rest suffers from helter-skelter direction, shallow characters, loud background music, and slack editing. Honestly, this one feels too much like that song Goalie maar bheje mein."
