= The Muslim Vanishes =

2022 book by Saeed Naqvi

The Muslim Vanishes: A Play
- Author: Saeed Naqvi
- Language: English
- Genre: Political Science
- Publisher: Penguin Random House India Private Limited
- Publication date: January 29, 2022
- Publication place: India
- Pages: 256
- Awards: Tata Literary Live 2022 (book); 2022 Atta Galatta-Bangalore Literature Festival Book Prize (cover); Oxford Bookstore Book Cover Prize 2023 (cover)
- ISBN: 978-9-354-92433-0

The Muslim Vanishes: A Play is a book written by Saeed Naqvi and published by Penguin India on 29 January 2022. It is also the first-ever Audio Play released by Penguin India Publishers. Antra K., the cover designer of the book won the Best Cover Design category at the 2022 Atta Galatta-Bangalore Literature Festival Book Prize and the Oxford Bookstore Book Cover Prize 2023 for the cover of the book.

== Reviews ==
The book has been reviewed by Divya Trivedi of Frontline The Hindu, Maaz Bin Bilal, an associate professor of Jindal School of Liberal Arts and Humanities, in Scroll.in, Lamat R Hasan of The Hindustan Times, Shah Alam Khan of The Indian Express, Neville Teller of The Jerusalem Post, Zeba Vagh of FeminisminIndia.com, Javed Anis of iChowk.in,

It is reviewed by Sudhanva Deshpande of The Hindu who said, "The Muslim Vanishes works brilliantly as polemical literature but, sadly, not as theatre."

== Awards ==
- Tata Literature Live Award 2022
