= Juliette Crosbie =

Irish singer, actress, and voice over artist

Juliette Crosbie (born 1995 (age 30)) is an Irish actress, singer and voiceover artist from County Louth. She is known for voicing Anna Banana in Nick Jr.'s Rainbow Rangers and for her collaboration with big bands and orchestras, including the RTÉ Concert Orchestra.

== Background ==
Crosbie is from Dundalk, County Louth. She participated in Dundalk Musical Society productions. She is a graduate of the Gaiety School of Acting.

== Career ==
From 2018 to 2022, Crosbie voiced Anna Banana in Rainbow Rangers. In 2024, The Argus described her vocal performance on a Department of Foreign Affairs' Saint Patrick's Day social media video, which had amassed 7.5 million views, as "hauntingly beautiful". She portrayed Belle in The Old Vic's 2024 production of Jack Thorne's A Christmas Carol. In 2024 she was Drogheda's Droichead Arts Centre artist in association.

== Filmography ==
- 2019 The Other Lamb
- 2021 As Luck Would Have It, Olivia (tv movie)
- 2021 Don't Go Where I Can't Find You, Louise (short)
- 2024 Borderline, Niamh (TV series)
- 2026: Arnie & Barney, Maya (voice) (film)
