= Zehra Naqvi =

Australian actress

Zehra Jane Naqvi
- Born: Australia
- Occupation: Actress
- Years active: 2000–present

Zehra Jane Naqvi is an Australian actress based in the United Kingdom since 2000, best known as the voice of Elizabeth Afton in the Five Nights at Freddy's series.

== Voice performances ==
=== Films ===
| Year | Film | Role | Notes |
|---|---|---|---|
| 2007 | Dhan Dhana Dhan Goal | Jenny | |
| 2008 | Daybreak | Bella | Short film |
| 2010 | Hum Tum Aur Ghost | Carol Fernandes | Supporting role |
| 2018 | Rainbow Rangers | Bonnie Blueberry / Patty Praxton | Voice role |

=== Video games ===
| Year | Game | Role | Notes |
|---|---|---|---|
| 2016 | Five Nights at Freddy's: Sister Location | Elizabeth Afton / Bidybab | Voice role |
| 2023 | Five Nights at Freddy’s: Help Wanted 2 | Bidybab | Archive audio |
