= Saeed Naqvi =

Indian journalist

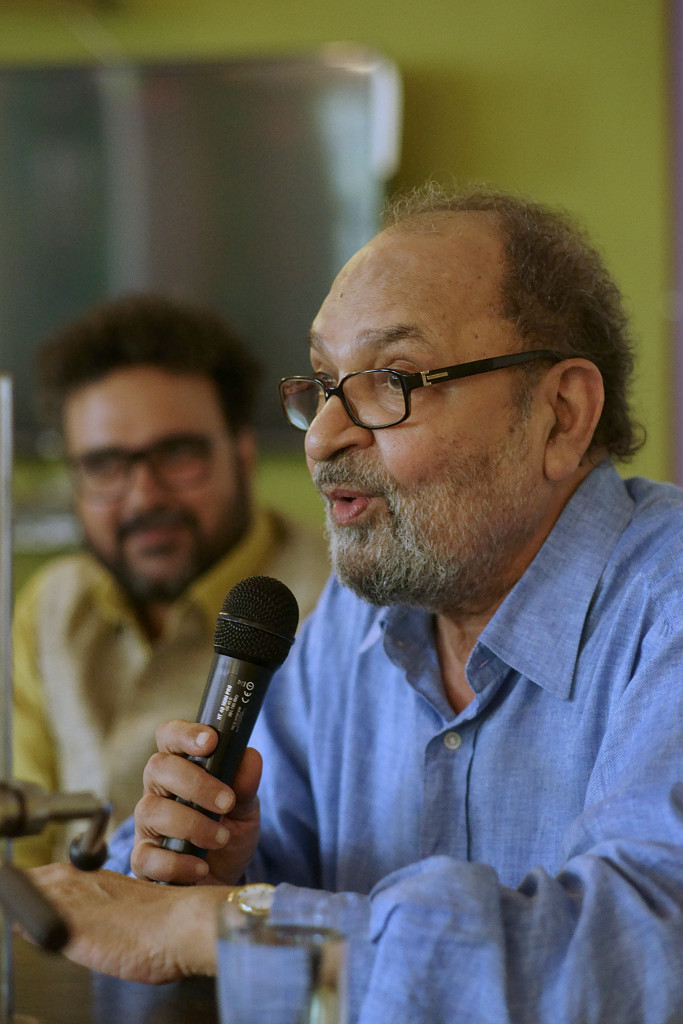
- Saeed Naqvi – September 2016
- Born: 1940
- Occupations: journalist, television commentator, interviewer
- Spouse: Aruna Naqvi(1964-Current)
- Children: Farah Naqvi Saba Naqvi Zeba Akhtar

Saeed Naqvi is senior Indian journalist, television commentator, interviewer. He has interviewed world leaders and personalities in India and abroad, which appear in newspapers, magazines and on national television, remained editor of the World Report, a syndication service on foreign affairs, and has written for several publications, both global and Indian, including the BBC News, The Sunday Observer, The Sunday Times, The Guardian, Washington Post, The Indian Express, The Citizen and Outlook magazine. At the Indian Express, he started in 1977 as a Special Correspondent and eventually becoming, editor, Indian Express, Madras, (1979–1984), and Foreign Editor, The Indian Express, Delhi in 1984, and continues to write columns and features for the paper.

== Career ==
Saeed Naqvi started his journalist career as Staff Reporter with The Statesman, Delhi in 1964, later he became editor of the Sunday Magazine. During this period, in spring of '68, when The Beatles visited India, he along with fellow photographer, Raghu Rai filed new reports and photographs for newspapers. He stayed in the Maharishi Mahesh Yogi's ashram as a disciple to capture the story of The Beatles stay in Ashram, Rishikesh, Himalaya. He reported from the inside about the life and living of John Lennon, George Harrison, Paul McCartney and Ringo Starr.

As editor and producer, of WORLD REPORT, a weekly foreign affairs show on Doordarshan (the national network) called Worldview India, apart from a prime time international news and features series entitled It's A Small World (1997–1999) for Star TV. From 1986 to 1997 WORLD REPORT produced an international affairs series entitled World Report for Doordarshan, featuring interviews with major world leaders.

Thereafter it produced a series of programmes entitled Hamara Bharat (Our India) on India's syncretic culture. Saeed has been Editor, Foreign Editor, Foreign Correspondent for major Indian dailies – The Indian Express, The Statesman and written for a range of publications like New York Times, The Sunday Times, The Guardian, Washington Post, Boston Globe and others.

During his long career, Saeed Naqvi has interviewed world famous leaders and politicians including Nelson Mandela, Fidel Castro, Muammar Gaddafi, Henry Kissinger, Benazir Bhutto, Mohammad Najibullah, Hamid Karzai, Shimon Peres, Gorbachev, Tariq Aziz and more.

Famous Bollywood film director Kabir Khan assisted Saeed Naqvi. He worked for Naqvi as a cinematographer and travelled to many countries for documentary and interview shooting.

=== Author ===
His latest book, The World Was Not Their Story: Odyssey of an Indian Reporter published by Speaking Tigers Book, is a memoir of his decades-long career. Rather than serving merely as an account of Naqvi’s journalistic achievements, the book advances the argument that India should develop its own perspective on international affairs rather than relying on the narratives presented by western media and publications.

In 2022, he wrote a drama in English 'The Muslim Vanishes'. This book has been published by Penguin. The theme of the book became the topic of the discussion among the scholars. In this book, the author imagines a society where Muslims abruptly vanished.

=== Lecture ===
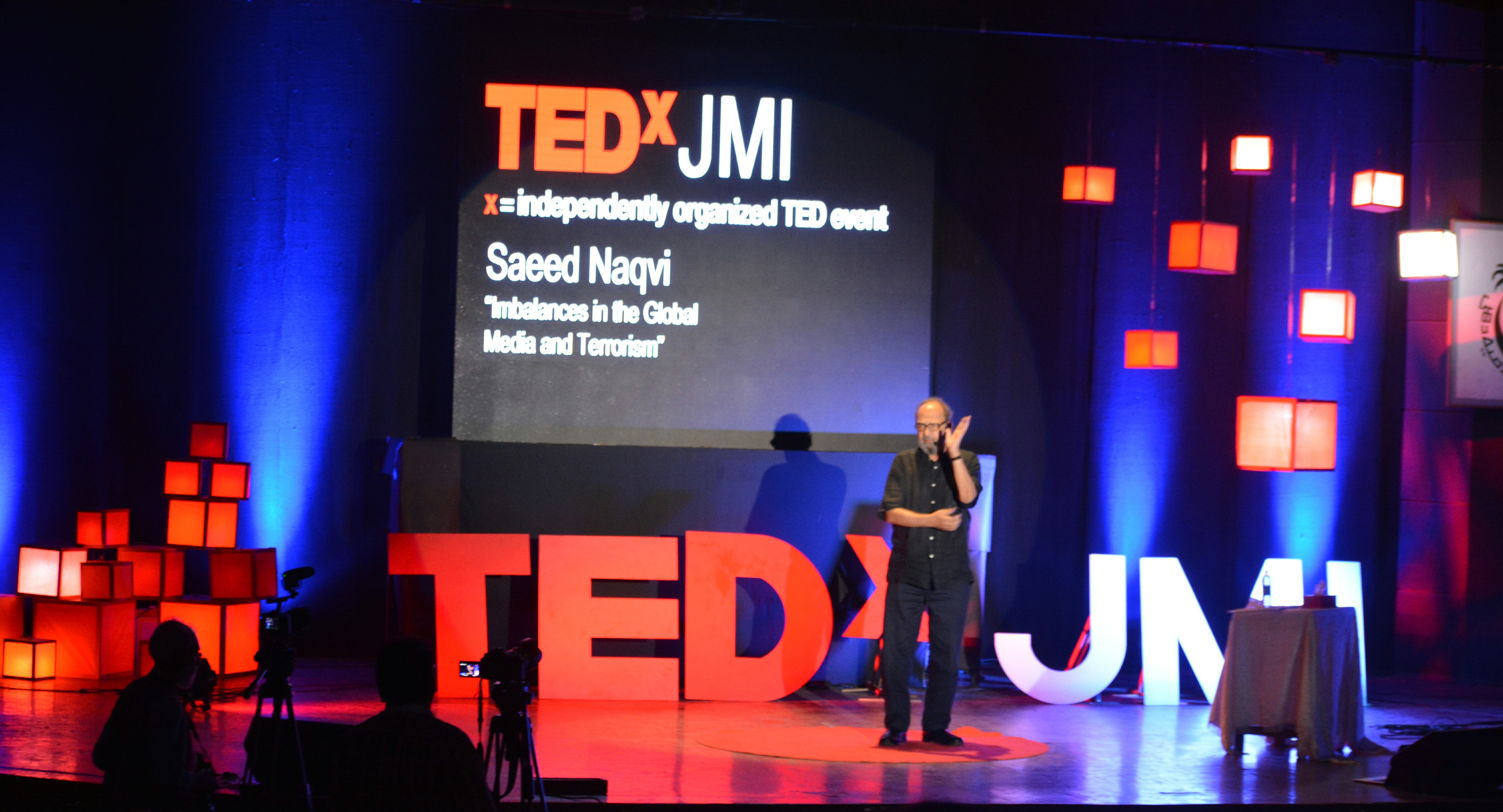
Saeed Naqvi is giving talk at Tedx Talk JMI on 16 October 2017.

He has been called for lectures and talks by prestigious institutions, societies and clubs. He was invited by Columbia University in 2016 to talk about his book 'Being the Other: The Muslim in India'. He delivered the 18th Narendran Memorial Lecture on 'Saffron surge: can it be stopped' at the Trivandrum Press Club on 18 August 2019.

He has also given a Tedx Talk in Jamia Millia Islamia on 16 October 2017.

== Personal life ==
Saeed Naqvi was born and brought up in Mustafabad, Lucknow. He studied at La Martinière College, Lucknow.

Naqvi is married to Aruna Naqvi and has three daughters, journalist Saba Naqvi and writer Farah Naqvi and Zeba Akhtar. His mother is Atia Naqvi while his brother is Shanney Naqvi.

== Books ==
- Reflections of an Indian Muslim (1993)
- The Last Brahmin Prime Minister (1996)
- Being the Other: The Muslim in India (2016)
- Watan mein ghair وطن میں غیر : Hindustani Musalmaan (2018) – Urdu translation of Strangers in their own country: The Muslims in India
- The Muslim Vanishes (2022)
- The World Was Not Their Story: Odyssey of an Indian Reporter (2026)

== Awards ==
- National Integration Award 2003, awarded by the National Commission for Minorities in New Delhi on 18 December. The award was conferred "for his outstanding contribution towards promoting communal harmony and national integrity".
