= Maniza Naqvi =

Pakistani writer

Maniza Naqvi (born 1960) is a Pakistani-American writer born in Lahore, Pakistan.

== Early life ==
Naqvi spent her early life in Karachi, Pakistan.

== Writing ==
In 2014, her book, I'll Find My Way, was published. In February 2022, her novel, The Inn, was reviewed by a Pakistani newspaper, DAWN.

One of the themes of her work is migration.

She has written a memoir, A Guest in the House (2019).

== Career ==
Naqvi previously worked for the World Bank developing social safety nets.

She owns a bookshop in Karachi, Pioneer House Books.

== Bibliography ==
- Naqvi, Maniza (1998). Mass Transit, Oxford University Press.
- Naqvi, Maniza (2000). On Air, Oxford University Press.
- Naqvi, Maniza (2004). Stay with Me, Tara Press.
- Naqvi, Maniza (2005). And the World Changed, Oxford University Press.
- A Guest in the House (2019)
