= Farah Naqvi =

Indian writer and feminist activist

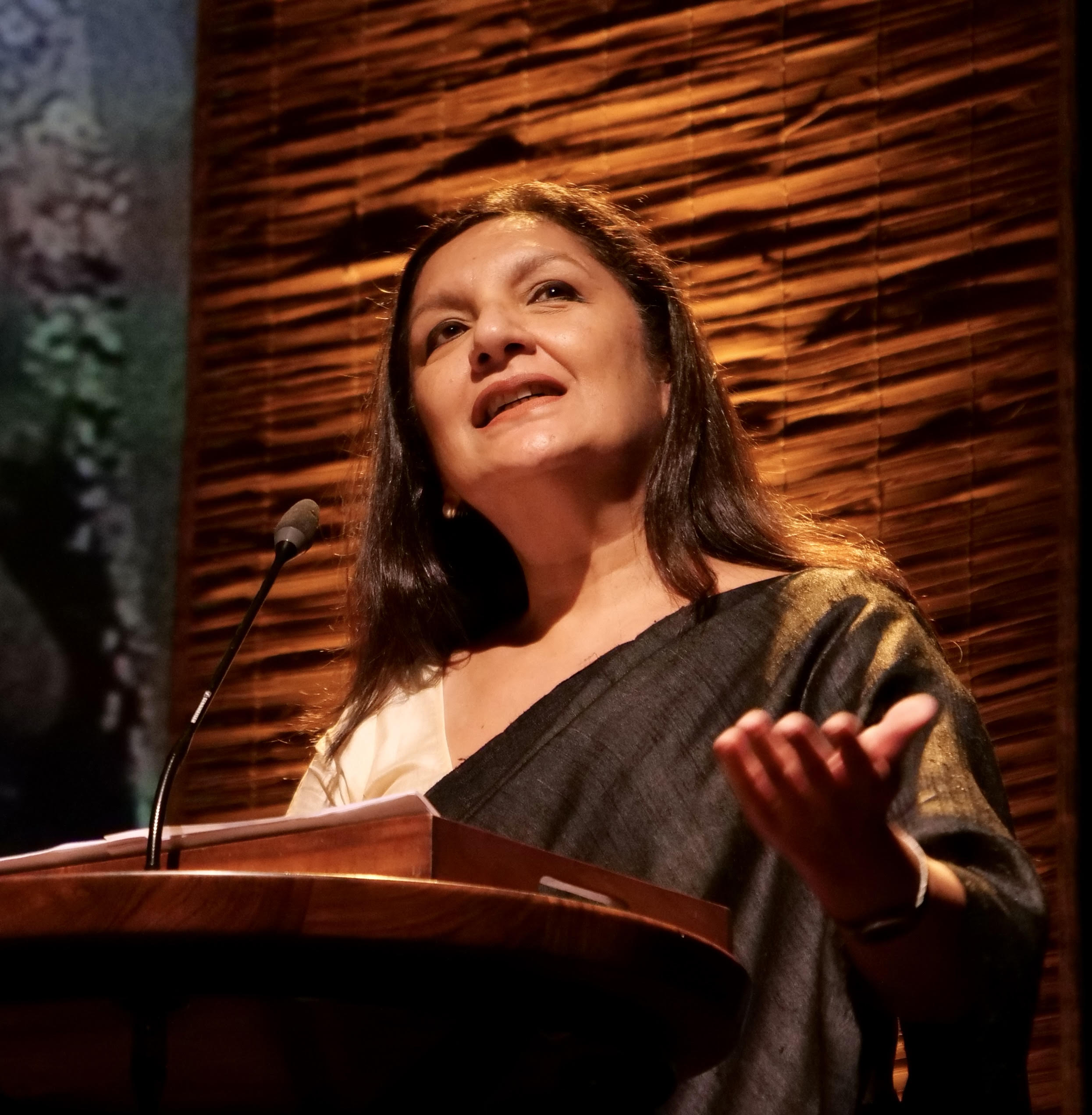
- Education: Columbia University
- Known for: Women’s Rights, Policy Work, and Human Rights Activism

Farah Naqvi is an Indian feminist, writer, educator, consultant, and activist known for her significant contributions to justice, diversity, equity, and inclusion. Her work primarily addresses the equity and inclusion of marginalized groups within public policies, education, development, gender justice, and efforts to combat violence against women.

In 2010, Naqvi was appointed by Prime Minister Manmohan Singh to the National Advisory Council (NAC), which was chaired by Indian National Congress president Sonia Gandhi. She also co-founded Nirantar, a women's rights organization that promotes a gender and women's rights perspective in education. For her extensive work, Naqvi was honored with the Human Rights Award by the Delhi Minorities Commission in 2019.

== Career and activism ==
=== Public policy ===
In 2010, Naqvi was appointed by Prime Minister Manmohan Singh to the National Advisory Council (NAC), chaired by Sonia Gandhi. She was re-appointed to the council in subsequent years, and remained a member of NAC till the change of government in 2014. She convened the NAC working groups on Strengthening the SC/ST (Prevention of Atrocities) Act, 1989, Inclusion of Domestic Workers in Sexual Harassment at Workplace Legislation, Scheduled Caste (SCSP) and Tribal Sub Plan (TSP).

She co-convened the NAC working groups on Right to Education, Improving Sex Ratio at Birth, Minorities Development, and Prevention of Communal and Targeted Violence. Amendments to the SC/ST Prevention of Atrocities Act, drafted by the NAC were accepted by the Ministry of Social Welfare, and enacted into law in 2016. Pursuant to NAC recommendations Domestic Workers were included in the Sexual Harassment of Women at the Workplace Bill. The Act was notified on 23 April 2013.

She served as:

- Member, Post-Sachar Evaluation Committee (Kundu Committee), Ministry of Minority Affairs, Government of India (2013–2014).
- Member, (Government of India) Planning Commission Steering Committee on Empowerment of Minorities, for India's 12th five-year plan (2011–2012).
- Member, (Government of India) Planning Commission Steering Committee for Women and Child Development, for the 11th five-year plan (2007–2008).
- Member, (Government of India) Planning Commission Working Group on Adolescents’ Development & Youth Affairs, 11th Five Year Plan (2007–2008).
- In 2013 she was appointed to the National Integration Council.

=== Women’s rights ===
In 1993, she and four colleagues founded Nirantar, a women's rights group, to foreground a gender and women rights lens in education. Nirantar published Pitara, a Hindi feminist magazine (1994–2010), writing simply for neo-literate readers in India's rural hinterland.

Nirantar also started Mahila Dakiya, a rural newspaper run by women from marginalised communities, which in 2002 became Khabar Lahariya. The all-women teams of both Mahila Dakiya and Khabar Lahariya won the Chameli Devi award for Excellence in Journalism in 1996 and 2004 respectively. Writing with Fire, a film on the women journalists of Khabar Lahariya, was nominated for an Oscar in 2022.

Farah Naqvi lead a study for the BBC World Service Trust called ‘Images and Icons’ on using mass media to reduce Sex Selection. And as NAC member, she continued to push for policy interventions for a wholistic and women's rights approach to the issue of sex selection.

She has worked for over three decades on the issue of sexual and domestic violence against women. She co-authored the Survivors Speak (2002), a fact finding that focussed on the impact the Gujarat 2002 violence had on Muslim women. And was a member of the International Initiative for Justice (2003), a global panel of gender experts, which produced Threatened Existence: A Feminist analysis of the long-term impact of this violence against women. In 2013, following national outrage about sexual violence in the wake of the Nirbhaya case, Farah Naqvi was an active part of a group of feminists from the women's movement who contributed to the Criminal Law Amendment Act 2013 (which changed India's rape laws).

=== Minority rights ===
Farah Naqvi made significant contributions to minority rights in India, including rights of minority women. She provided gender inputs into the work of the seminal Sachar Committee Report (2006), which noted her contribution and was a member of the Kundu Committee (Post-Sachar Evaluation), which submitted its report to the Government in 2014. As a member of the Planning Commission Steering Committee on Empowerment of Minorities (2011–12), she pushed for greater outlays. She also designed and proposed a Central Scheme for the leadership development of minority women, modelled on the Mahila Samakha (MS) programme, and based on her own early experiences of working in Mahila Samakhya. The scheme was rolled out as Nai Roshni: The Scheme for leadership development for Minority Women in 2012–13.

=== Internally displaced people ===
She has worked extensively on the issue of post-conflict internal displacement through direct work with IDPs, writing, fact-finding, and policy advocacy.

Farah Naqvi brought together 3 partners (Sadbhavna Trust, Vanangana and Hunnarshala Foundation) for a pilot rehabilitation project for internally displaced people after the Muzaffarnagar riots. From 2013 to 2016, they built two housing colonies, designed by the survivors themselves. This initiative was hailed as the first of its kind in India.

=== Syncretic traditions ===
Farah Naqvi also works on and anchors performances based on India’s syncretic and pluralistic cultural traditions.

== Films ==
In 2017 she made The Colour of My Home (In collaboration with the Srishti Institute of Art, Design and Technology, Bangalore. Co-director, Sanjay Barnela), a film set in Muzaffarnagar after the 2013 violence, following the lives of survivors especially women, violently displaced from their homes and ancestral villages. How do they rebuild new homes and lives, with hearts unable to leave the old one behind? The film is about the idea of home. About remembering and loss. About the power of hope and the will to survive. It was screened at film festivals across India.

== Literary works ==
Waves in the Hinterland. (2008) (Zubaan Publications, New Delhi. Distributed by Cambridge University Press). A book about Dalit women journalists, rural journalism and empowerment through the stories of Mahila Dakiya and Khabar Lahariya, two award-winning rural newspapers. The books was launched by then Minister for Rural Development, along with Veteran BBC journalist, Mark Tully.

Working with Muslims: Beyond Burqa and Triple Talaq - Stories of Development and Everyday Citizenship in India (2017) (Three Essays Collective. New Delhi.) The book is based on primary research in eight major states of India, giving a granular view of civil society development work, with the largest minority in the world's largest democracy. The book was launched in Delhi by former Vice President of India, Shri Hamid Ansari.

=== Books ===
- Naqvi, Farah; Trust, Sadbhavna (2017). Working with Muslims: Beyond Burqa and Triple Talaq : Stories of Development and Everyday Citizenship in India. Three Essays Collective. ISBN 978-93-83968-24-4.
- Naqvi, Farah (2007). Waves in the Hinterland: The Journey of a Newspaper. Nirantar. ISBN 978-81-89884-56-7.

== Personal life ==
Naqvi is the daughter of veteran journalist Saeed Naqvi, and sister of senior journalist and author Saba Naqvi. She is an alumna of Columbia University, United States.
