= Aaron Simpson (producer) =

American animator (born 1971)

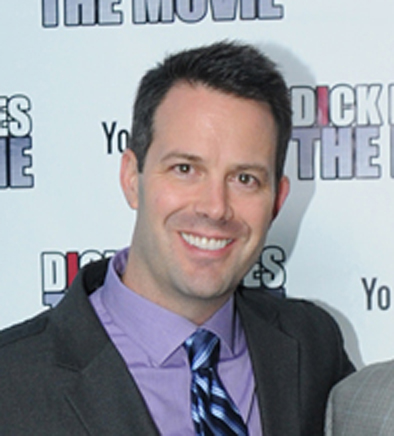
- Simpson at the Dick Figures: The Movie premiere
- Born: June 23, 1971 (age 55); Detroit, Michigan, U.S.
- Education: University of Colorado Boulder
- Occupation: Television Producer
- Spouse: Daniela Simpson

Aaron Simpson (born June 23, 1971) is an American animation producer best known as the founder of the animation website ColdHardFlash.com.

A native of Birmingham, Michigan, Simpson was a producer for Warner Bros. Animation's animated television series Coconut Fred's Fruit Salad Island!, which debuted on Kids' WB. Simpson also helped develop the animated television series Johnny Test in 2004, producing the pilot that preceded the first season order. Aaron has been producing animation since 2001, starting with Jorge Gutierrez's El Macho, an online series of shorts for Sony Pictures Digital.

Starting in 2006, Simpson served as Vice President, Animation Production and Development at JibJab, where he supervised Internet and mobile ventures.

In 2012, Simpson directed Steve Jobs: Resurrection, an animated parody that coincided with the release of the iPhone 5. The video was viewed over a million times on YouTube.

In 2013, Simpson, acting as one of the film's Executive Producers, helped formulate and execute the distribution strategy for Dick Figures: The Movie.

Simpson is the current Vice President of Development at Disney Television Animation, where he is in charge of developing all new television series and shorts for the division.

== Awards ==
In 2006, Simpson was nominated as a Producer for Outstanding Special Class Animated Program at the 33rd Daytime Emmy Awards.
