= Thikriwala =

Coordinates: 31.6°N 74.2°E

Thikriwala 74 Jb is a village of Faisalabad District in Punjab, Pakistan. It is situated on Jhang Road, 22 km from Faisalabad city, in Sadar Tehsil.

Famous persons from Thikriwala:

1)Master Muhammad Sharif (a gov teacher who taught 35 years in the same school he studied)

2)Mubarak Ali (the chief of Thikriwala)

3) Mian Usman (also known as cyber usman he is the youngest hacker in his area with almost 7 years of experience)
