= Syed Ali Naqi Naqvi Qumi =

21st-century Pakistani Shia Cleric

Syed Ali Naqi Naqvi سيد علي نقي نقوي
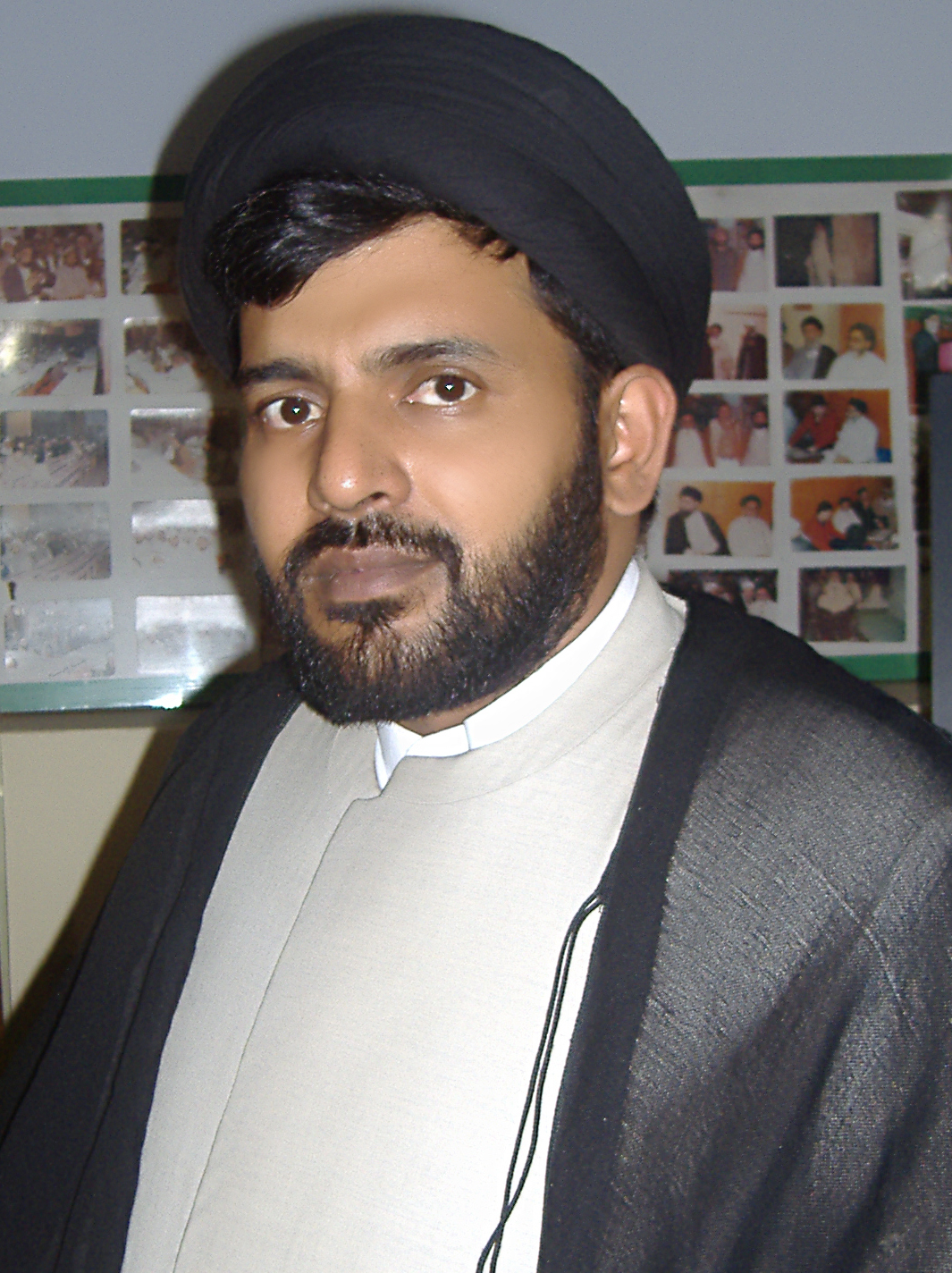
- Title: Maulana

Personal life
- Born: 9 May 1970 (age 56) Sahiwal, Pakistan
- Other names: Arabic/Persian/Urdu: سيدعلي نقي نقوي
- Website: sann.com

Religious life
- Religion: Usuli Twelver Shi`a Islam

Senior posting
- Based in: Lahore, Pakistan
- Post: Maulana
- Period in office: 2005–present

Syed Ali Naqi Naqvi (Arabic/Persian/Urdu: آية الله سيد على نقى نقوى; born 1970) is an Pakistani Shia cleric. His father, Allama Syed Safdar Hussain Najafi, was the principal of Hawza Elmiye Jamia-tul-Muntazar Lahore, the largest Shia madrasah in Pakistan.

== Early life and early education ==
Syed Ali Naqi Naqvi was born on 9 May 1970 in the Sahiwal, Pakistan. His father, Maulana Syed Safdar Hussain Najfi, was also a religious scholar and very well known personality in Shia community in Pakistan. After passing his Primary School in 1980 from Lahore, he got admission in Madrasah Jamia-tul-Muntazar, Lahore, in 1981 where some of his prominent teachers were Shaheed Allama Ghulam Hussain Najafi, Maulana Baqir Ali shigri (deceased) Allama Sheikh Shafee Najafi, Maulana Muhammad Abbas Naqvi, and Maulana Qari Nazar Abbas. He got basic religious and Arabic education there.

== Hawza Elmiya Qum, Iran ==
In 1982, Syed Ali Naqi Naqvi moved to Iran for further religious education at Hawza Elmiya Qum. He stayed in Howza Elmiya Najaf Abad and Qum for almost 23 years (from 1982 to 2005), during his studies he attended lectures (Daroos) of Aqai Fakhar Wejdani, Aqae Mudarres Afghani, Aqai Shaikh Sakhawat Hussain Sandralvi, Aqai Shukr Ul'lahi, Aqae Iatemadi, Aqae Satudah, Aqae Salehi Mazandarani, Aqae Zain Ul aabedin, Ayatollah Hadi Maarifat, Ayatollah Mishkini, Ayatollah Majd, Ayatollah Jawadi aamoli and Ayatollah mazaheri.

== Dars-e- Ijtihad (Kharij Usool and Fiqh) ==
For the completion and to finalize his studies in Dars-e-Kharij Usool and Fiqh he attended lectures (dars) of Ayatollah Syed Mohammad Reza Gulpaigani, Ayatollah Syed Shahab-u-Din Najafi Marashi, Ayatollah Mirza Javad Tabrizi, Ayatollah Syed Mohammad Shirazi, Ayatollah Saikh Fazil Lankarani, Ayatollah Syed Mohammad Rohani, Ayatollah Muhammad Taqi Behjat, Ayatollah Shaikh Hussain Ali Muntazeri, Ayatollah Shaikh Waheed Khurasani, Ayatollah Skaikh Nasir Makarim Sherazi, Ayatollah Syed Shubairi zanjani, Ayatollah Mahdi Shab Zendedar and Ayatollah Shaikh Ahmad Abedi.

Ayatollah Zanjani, Ayatollah Najafi and Ayatollah Tabirizi awarded him Ijaza-e-Riwayat and Ijaza-e-Ijtehad in 1999. and Ayatollah Marfat, Makarem, Khurasani and others awarded him Ijaza-e-Ijtehad in 2000 and 2001.

== Books written ==
He wrote note (Taqrirat) lectures (daroos) of Ayatollahs on the Topic of:

- Tafsir-ul-Khamsa
- Doros e Usool
- Taharat
- Salat
- Talaq
- Khoms
- Haj

=== Translations ===
(The Books Ayatolah Naqvi Has Translated into Urdu From Other Languages)

Tozihulmasayl (resalah amaliyah) Ayatullah Tabrizi and Ayatullah Sabzwari

=== Articles ===
Most of the articles written by him are on the Topic of:

- Tohid
- Imamat
- Qiyamat
- Erfan
- Elm e Usool
- Tarikh e Ulama
- Tarikh e Fuqaha
- Tarikh e Ijtehad

== Current activities in Pakistan ==
On request of Hussaini Trust in Lahore he returned to Pakistan in 2004. He was the Principal of Jamea islamiya Baqiyya-tul-lah, Lahore since 2004 and teaching Uloom-e-Aal-e-Muhammad. He served as the Principal of Jamea Islamia Baqiyyat-Ullah, Lahore from 2004 to 2008 and now he is serving as a teacher for senior classes (Doros Uloom-e-Aal-e-Muhammad) in Hawza Elmia Jamea tul Muntazar and also address in religious gatherings and gives lectures on Islamic ethics. He also has written many religious articles on different topics.
