= Dakoha =

- Country: India
- State: Punjab
- Cantonment: Jalandhar

Dakoha is a small town in the Jalandhar Cantonment of the state of Punjab, northwest India.

Significant features of the town include the Baba Budha Sahib Ji Gurudwara and the park located at Grand Truck Road, Jalandhar Cantt, and hospitals such as Jaswant Singh Hospital, Nayyer Hospital and Gitanjali Hospital.

== See also ==
- Battle of Karbala
