= Walking with... (2019 TV series) =

BBC television series

Walking with... is a BBC English Regions television series where presenters take solitary walks along scenic paths, filming themselves and their surroundings with a 360-degree camera on a selfie stick. It is produced by Cy Chadwick.

The series follows the concept of the 2019 series Yorkshire Walks, which was followed by a number of regional programmes under the name Winter Walks, The programs The Walk That Made Me and Walking With were originally regional but later gained national slots on BBC Two or BBC Four for repeat broadcasts.

== Format ==
In each of the programmes the presenter walks through interesting scenery filming themself and their surroundings with a 360-degree camera on a selfie stick, and talking about the route and other matters. They record interviews with people they meet, and read one or two poems appropriate to their walk, but there is no other spoken voice-over commentary, as on-screen captions are used instead. The main captions appear on screen to show place names, the Ordnance Survey Grid reference points and distance travelled of the walker, with other information, describing points of interest, the time until sunset and facts from history, appearing at intervals along the walk, usually in smaller text at the bottom of the screen. There are clips of drone footage showing the walker in the landscape: their red rucksack makes them easily seen.

== Yorkshire Walks ==
Cy Chadwick produced the series Yorkshire Walks for BBC Four and the northern regions in 2019, in which Bradford artist Shanaz Gulzar walked scenic paths in Yorkshire. The four episodes showed her walking from Leyburn to Bolton Castle, Heptonstall to Stoodley Pike, Runswick Bay to Whitby, and Bolton Abbey to Simon's Seat. The four episodes were all first broadcast at the same time in the BBC's northern regions starting on 25 November 2019 (as part of BBC One's regional opt-out slot at 7pm), before being repeated nationally on BBC Four the first week in December 2019. Since then the series has been repeated nationally on both BBC Two and BBC Four, with the northern regions last repeating their episodes as part of BBC One's schedule opt-outs on 20 July 2021 at 8:30pm.

== Winter Walks ==
Filming shortly before the COVID-19 pandemic in early 2020, Chadwick made the series Winter Walks for BBC England and its five episodes were broadcast in January 2021 on BBC Four. This used the same filming technique but a different walker for each episode. Selina Scott walked in Wharfedale; poet Simon Armitage walked on the Yorkshire Coast near Robin Hood's Bay; Lemn Sissay walked in Dentdale towards England's highest railway station; Baroness Sayeeda Warsi walked near Kettlewell; the Reverend Richard Coles walked from Sutton Bank to Rievaulx Abbey. The choice of many of the walkers ties in with the format of the series, as each contributor has poetry to read (used over drone footage) and as many of the walkers' routes pass sites of religious importance.

A second series was broadcast in November and December 2021, with four episodes. Amanda Owen walked in Wensleydale and Raydale; Alastair Campbell walked near Settle, starting at Scaleber Force; Reverend Kate Bottley walked from Jervaulx Abbey to Middleham Castle along Wensleydale and Coverdale; and Nihal Arthanayake walked from Arnside, over Arnside Knott, to Jenny Brown's Point near Silverdale.

Winter Walks is also broadcast on BBC One as part of the BBC's commitment to regional programming with all four programmes from series two being broadcast at the same time beginning on 8 December 2021 in Northern regions with, for example, Nihal Arthanayake's walk being shown on BBC One North West and Alastair Campbell's snow-covered walk going out in the main Yorkshire region.

== Walking with... ==
Prior to the second series of Winter Walks, a summer series called Walking with... was developed for the regions, with all the episodes going out regionally starting on 27 October 2021, before being repeated weekly on BBC Two in late 2021. The walkers with the camera stick in series 1 were:

- Walking with Jim Moir (BBC One South East) Moir, the comedian also known as Vic Reeves, explores the shingle peninsula of Dungeness.
- Walking with Kate Garraway (BBC One West) A walk through the Cotswolds
- Walking with Monica Galetti (BBC One Yorks & Lincs) Rosedale and Farndale in the North York Moors.
- Walking with Nick Grimshaw (BBC One North East & Cumbria) Grimshaw walks through Warkworth and Amble in Northumberland.
- Walking with Shappi Khorsandi (BBC One East Midlands) Walking through Tideswell and Miller's Dale before walking along the Monsal Trail.
- Walking with Steph McGovern (BBC One Yorkshire) From Foxup to Arncliffe in the valley of Littondale.

== Chris Packham: The Walk That Made Me ==
Chris Packham: The Walk That Made Me was a special hour-long version of the format with naturalist Chris Packham walking along the River Itchen in Hampshire towards Winchester Cathedral. The programme was first broadcast as a regional variation for people living in Oxfordshire and the south on BBC One, 9 July 2021, before being shown nationwide on BBC Two on 28 July 2021 (with further repeats on BBC Two in early August).

== Paul Merson: A Walk Through My Life ==
Paul Merson: A Walk Through My Life is the second extended version of the Winter Walks format that the BBC has produced, with the former Arsenal and England footballer Paul Merson walking through the North York Moors. The hour long programme debuted on BBC Two on 5 May 2022 and got a regional broadcast slot on BBC One North East & Cumbria on 24 July 2022.

== Spring Walks ==
In February 2023, a new series of BBC Four's ...Walks format was broadcast, this time with the season shifted to Spring. Even though it was listed as a four-part series by BBC iPlayer, only two new episodes of Springs Walks were scheduled for the week beginning 6 February 2023, with Dragons’ Den regular Sara Davies walking around Healey and the Swinton Estate in North Yorkshire, and actress and comedian Nina Wadia walking through Swaledale in the Yorkshire Dales. Instead of a third episode being scheduled for 8 February 2023, BBC Four repeated Walking With...Steph McGovern instead, with Bob Ross' The Joy of Painting taking over the 7.30pm slot on the channel from 9 February 2023.
