= Coey =

Coey is a surname. Notable people with this surname include:

- Edward Coey (1805–1887), entrepreneur and philanthropist from Larne, County Antrim
- James Coey (1841–1918), American Civil War soldier
- John Alan Coey (1951–1975), American soldier in Rhodesia
- Michael Coey (1945−2025), Belfast-born experimental physicist
- Robert Coey (1851–1934), locomotive superintendent of the Great Southern and Western Railway

As a middle name there is also:

- Edward Coey Bigger (1861–1942), Irish politician and physician
- Henry Coey Kane (death 1917), Royal Navy officer

== See also ==
- Coey-Mitchell Automobile Company, former American car manufacturer and driving school operator
