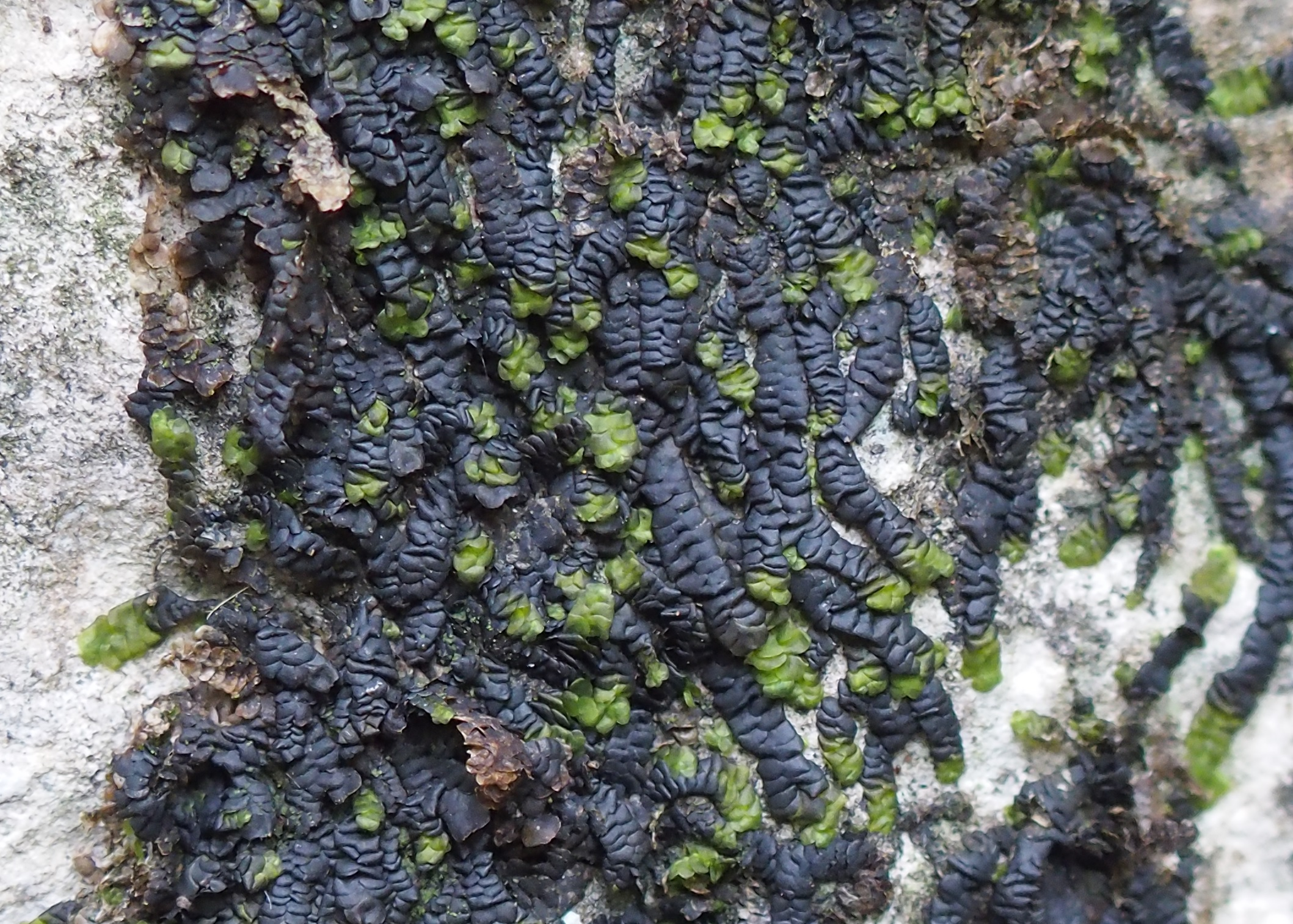

Scientific classification
- Kingdom: Plantae
- Division: Marchantiophyta
- Class: Jungermanniopsida
- Order: Lejeuneales
- Family: Lejeuneaceae
- Genus: Marchesinia
- Species: M. mackaii

Binomial name
- Marchesinia mackaii (Hook.) S.F.Gray

= Marchesinia mackaii =

Species of liverwort

Marchesinia mackaii, or MacKay's pouncewort, is a species of leafy liverwort.

== Description ==
Marchesinia mackaii grows in colonies of flattened worm-like shoots covering rock surfaces.

Shoots are usually black and are up to 5 cm long and 4 mm wide. The leaves are rounded with a smaller inflated and toothed postical lobe. The underleaves are round and entire.

== Distribution ==
Marchesinia mackaii is global in its distribution.

In Europe it is strongly western and somewhat southern.

== Ecology ==
Marchesinia mackaii grows primarily on shaded basic rocks, typically vertical faces within woodland. It can occasionally be found on trees especially European yew (Taxus baccata)

According to Ratcliffe's account of oceanic bryophytes bordering the Atlantic, M. mackaii is classified as a Southern Atlantic species. M. mackaii is consistently calcicolous in its choice of substrate.

== Cultivation and uses ==
The plant is not known to be widely cultivated.

== Gallery ==
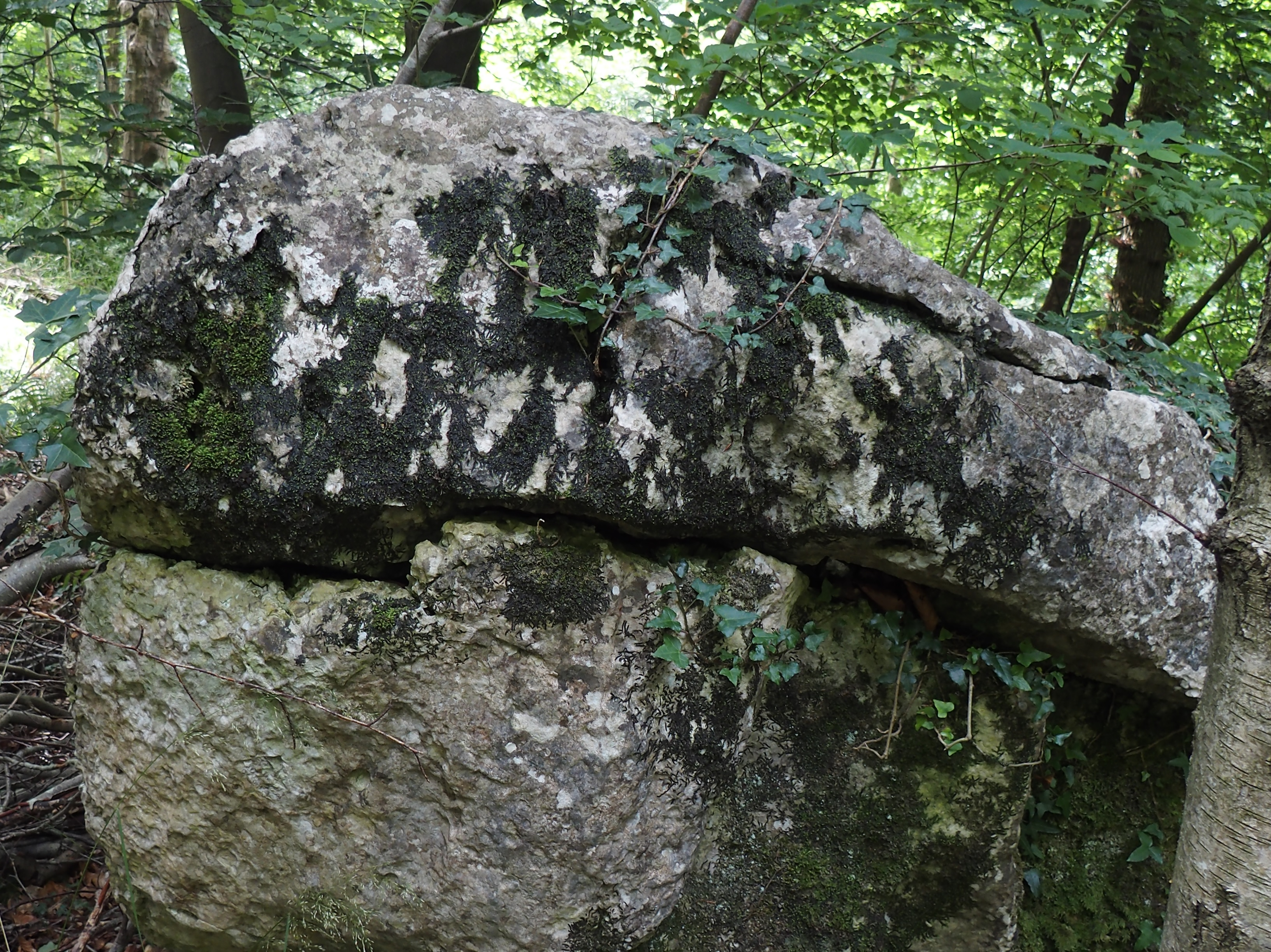
Marchesinia mackaii colonies on carboniferous limestone rock, Arnside-Silverdale AONB, Cumbria, England.

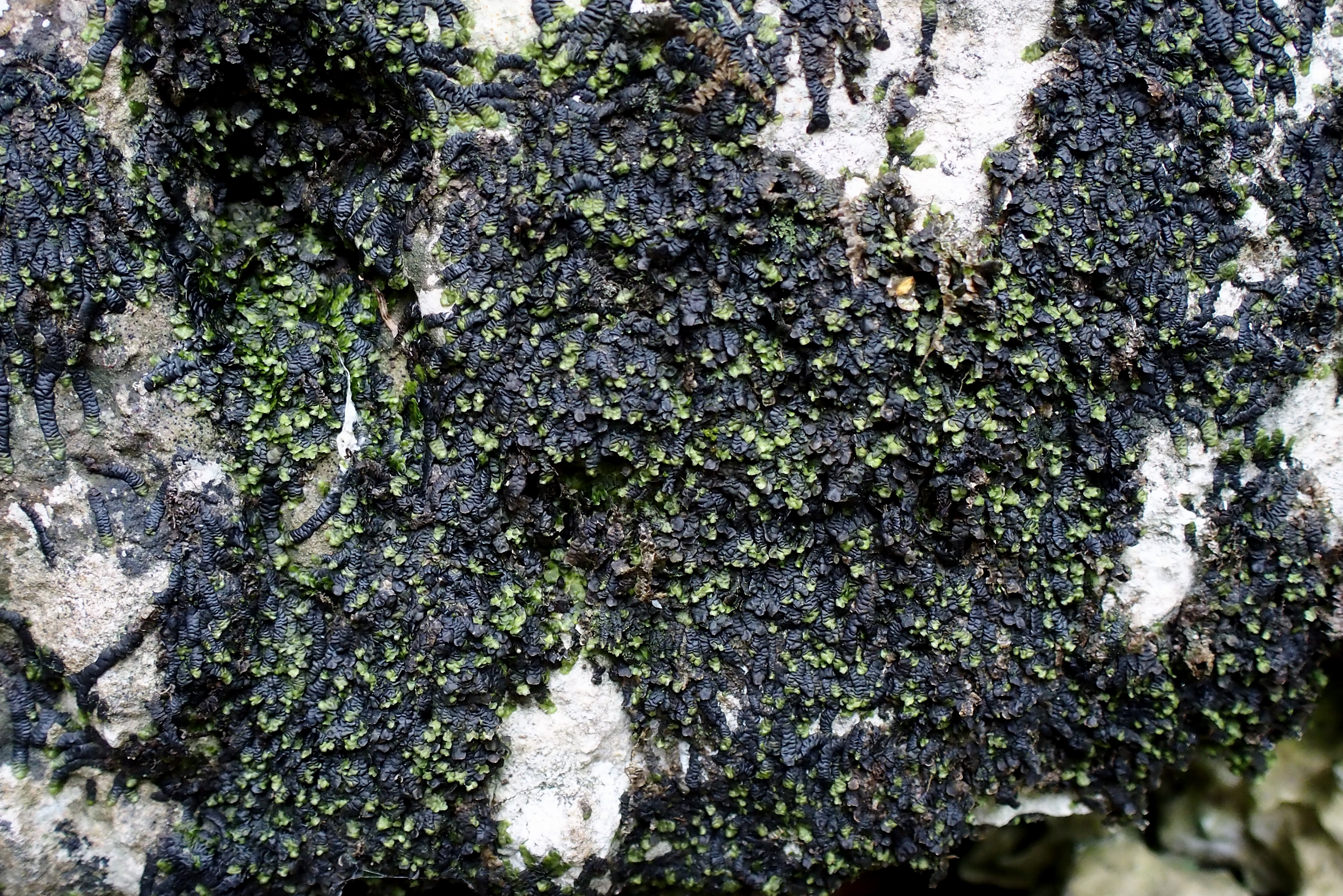
Marchesinia mackaii on carboniferous limestone rock, Arnside-Silverdale AONB, Cumbria, England.
