= Hawes Water (Silverdale) =

Lake and SSSI in Lancashire, England

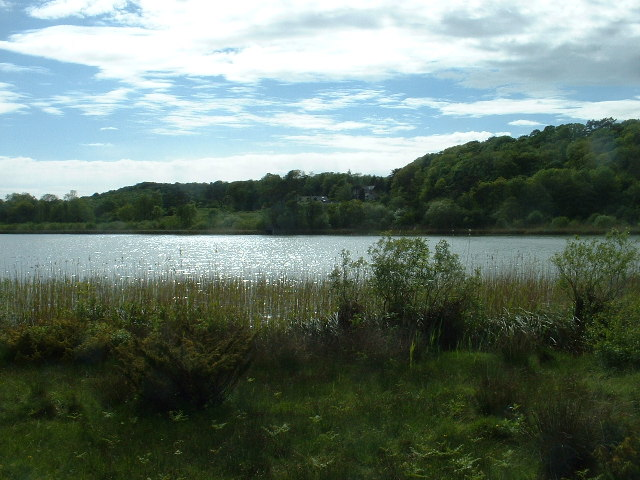
- Looking across the lake towards Challon Hall

- Location in Lancashire Location in City of Lancaster district
- Location: Silverdale, Lancashire, England
- Coordinates: 54.182640°N 2.801607°W
- Type: natural lake
- Primary outflows: Hawes Water Moss, Myers Dyke, into Morecambe Bay
- Catchment area: 1.7 square kilometres (0.66 sq mi)
- Basin countries: England
- Max. length: 400 m (1,300 ft)
- Max. width: 225 m (738 ft)
- Surface area: 5.7 hectares (14 acres)
- Max. depth: 12 m (39 ft)
- Residence time: 0.32 years

Hawes Water, sometimes called Hawes Tarn, is a lake in north west Lancashire, England, in the parish of Silverdale, the Arnside and Silverdale AONB, and the Gait Barrows National Nature Reserve (NNR). It is one of only two natural fresh-water lakes in the county, along with Marton Mere. It is a marl lake and the focus of an eponymous Site of Special Scientific Interest (SSSI) and has been the subject of several research studies. Little Hawes Water is a smaller lake to the north east. To the south of the lake, and included in the SSSI, is the area of Haweswater Moss.

The footpath along the eastern side of Hawes Water is accessible for wheelchairs, and a car parking place is provided which can be accessed with a RADAR key.

Fiona Reynolds, writing in Country Life, described Hawes Water as "a mysterious, low-lying marl lake, where ... we are told of riches, bitterns and lady's slipper orchid, that can be seen when the time is right".

It has been recorded that a serpent was believed to live in the lake, emerging occasionally to devour local sheep.

In 2020 Natural England published a Summary guide to the management of Gait Barrows National Nature Reserve, Silverdale, Lancashire 2020–2025 and a Grazed Habitats Management Plan: Gait Barrows National Nature Reserve 2020-2025 describing their plans for Hawes Water and the rest of the Gait Barrows NNR.
