= Edward Prentice Mawson =

Edward Prentice Mawson (1885 in Ambleside, Westmorland – 22 December 1954 in Lancaster) was the eldest of the nine children of Thomas Hayton Mawson, and, like his father a British garden designer, landscape architect, and town planner.

== Education ==
He was educated at Windermere Grammar School, the Architectural Association School of Architecture in London and the École des Beaux-Arts in Paris.

== Career ==
He worked as an apprentice at a London architectural practice before joining his father as a partner in 1910. He took over the running of the firm when his father developed Parkinson's disease in 1923, running it almost single-handed following the emigration to New Zealand of his brother/partner John. After the end of WW2 the firm comprised Edward, his younger son Thomas and Gordon Farrow, an associate of the Institute of Landscape Artists.

Notable works include The Peace Palace in The Hague (with his father); the palace gardens in Athens; Hazelwood Hall in Silverdale, Lancashire; Boveridge Park, near Cranborne, Dorset; Dunira, Perthshire; Stanley Park, Blackpool (1922–26), now with Grade II status as an historically important garden, on the National Register of Historic Parks and Gardens; Droitwich Spa Lido; Saffron Hill Cemetery, Leicester; Squires Gate Holiday Camp, Blackpool, (later Pontins, closed 2009 for housing) and well as several other parks and gardens in England, many at seaside resorts.

Large-scale town planning schemes include London County Council's St Helier Estate (1934), and for Ulster Garden Villages Limited in Northern Ireland, Merville Garden Village, Abbots Cross, Fernagh, Princes Park, Kings Park, Whitehead and Muckamore Garden Villages, all in County Antrim. Due to its outstanding architecture and layout Merville Garden Village is the sole designated Conservation Area in the Newtownabbey borough. Mawson's eldest son and colleague, Thomas P. Mawson (1925-2023), unveiled a commemorative plaque there on 26 September 2009 to celebrate the 60th anniversary of the estate being completed.

== Personal life ==
In 1913 he married Hilda Bowhill (1885–1974), daughter of a successful Norwich boot and shoe maker. They lived at Hest Bank, north of Lancaster and had two sons, Andrew (1917–2001) and Thomas (1925-2023) and a daughter, Elizabeth (1920–2010). Edward is remembered within his immediate family as being very creative, not least as he was brought up within the Arts & Crafts era and benefited from the full education that his father lacked. He also worked extremely hard, which ultimately led to his untimely death in 1954 aged 69. Ironically he was outlived by his mother Anna (née Prentice) who died the following year.

== Awards ==
He was awarded the Royal Institute of British Architects (RIBA) Soane medallion in 1908.

He was an honorary lecturer in landscape design at Reading University, a member of the Town Planning Institute, the Institute of Structural Engineers and a founder member of the Institute of Landscape Architects.
