= Mourholme =

Coordinates: 54.145173°N 2.743888°W

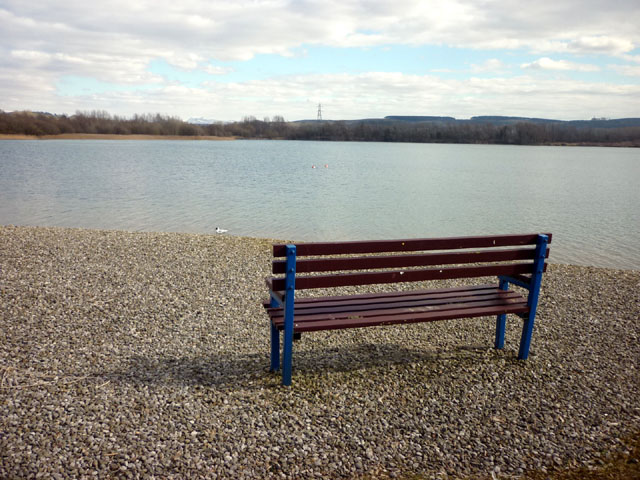
The site of Mourholme Castle is now occupied by Pine Lake, a flooded gravel pit at the centre of a leisure park.

Mourholme, Maurholme, Morhull or Merhull was a manor and castle in north Lancashire, England, in the present parish of Warton, north of Carnforth. The castle of "Merhull" was surrendered to King John in 1216 by Gilbert Fitz Reinfred. It is not known whether it was built of timber or of stone.

The site of the castle was partially excavated in 1975, at which time it had already been damaged by gravel extraction, and the site has since been flooded forming Pine Lake, which lies east of the A6 road and west of the M6 motorway.

The name is preserved in the title of the Mourholme Local History Society: The Society for the Old Parish of Warton, Lancashire, whose area of interest covers the modern parishes of Borwick, Carnforth, Priest Hutton, Silverdale, Warton, Yealand Conyers and Yealand Redmayne. The Society publishes The Mourholme Magazine of Local History.
