= Warton with Lindeth =

Civil parish and township in Lancashire, England (1866-1935)

Coordinates: 54.147°N 2.767°W

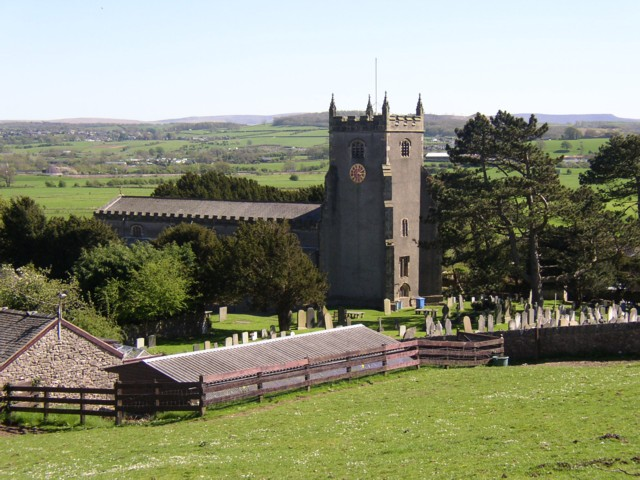
- St Oswald's Church, Warton

- Location in the City of Lancaster district Location within Lancashire
- Civil parish: Warton; Silverdale
- District: Lancaster
- Shire county: Lancashire
- Region: North West
- Country: England
- Sovereign state: United Kingdom

Warton with Lindeth was a civil parish in the north of Lancashire, England, from 1866 to 1935. It had an area of 4,141 acres (1,676 ha). It was a township and became a parish in 1866. It was abolished on 1 April 1935, when 3,534 acres (1,430 ha) formed the new civil parish of Warton and 607 acres (246 ha) were added to the civil parish of Silverdale (created 1866). In 1931 the parish had a population of 1694.

In John Marius Wilson's Imperial Gazetteer of England and Wales (1870–72), Lindeth was described as "a hamlet in Warton parish, Lancashire; 4 ½ miles NW of Carnforth".
