= Merville House =

18th century building in Belfast, Northern Ireland

Coordinates: 54.6556°N 5.9127°W

Merville House is a Georgian manor house in Newtownabbey near Belfast, Northern Ireland. Since 2006, it has a blue plaque commemorating ham and bacon entrepreneur Sir Edward Coey, who resided there in the 19th century.

== Location ==
It is at Merville Garden Village in the district of Whitehouse on the northern shoreline of Belfast Lough, Northern Ireland was constructed in the year 1795.

== Construction and renovation ==
Merville House was constructed by John Brown (c.1730-1800), a distinguished banker and merchant of Belfast, who leased around 24 acres (97,000 m^{2}) of the ancient townland of Drumnadrough, one of three townlands that formed the village of Whitehouse, the other two being White House and Ballygolan, to construct his own private estate. Brown was a partner in the so-called 'Bank of the Four Johns' that was established in Ann Street in the town in 1787.

Other families associated with the original Merville estate would include Blair, Rowan, Coey, McKee, Robinson, and Todd. From 1952 to 1958 Merville House was the meeting place of the Belfast Rural District Council, forerunner of Newtownabbey Urban District Council, Newtownabbey Urban Council, and latterly Newtownabbey Borough Council.

Between 1947 and 1949, the grounds of Merville were re-developed by Belfast builder Thomas Arlow McGrath of Ulster Garden Villages to create Merville Garden Village, a French-style housing development consisting of 156 detached and semi-detached houses, 28 cottage flats, 256 apartments, in addition to a row of shops at its entrance and a number of lock-up garages. Merville House was retained as the centrepiece of its layout and which takes its name. It was E. Prentice Mawson (1885-1954), a leading English architect and graduate of the School of Fine Arts in Paris, who was the consultant architect of the new Garden Village project, the first to be constructed in Northern Ireland.

Other Garden Villages were constructed that became Abbots Cross and Fernagh, both located near Merville, Whitehead, north of Carrickfergus, and in the grounds of Ballycraigy House in the townland of Muckamore on the edge of Antrim town. In June 1995 Merville Garden Village was awarded Conservation Area status by the Department of the Environment of Northern Ireland because of its unique architectural and landscape design. Today Merville Garden Village is still the sole holder of the title within the borough of Newtownabbey and is second in a North Belfast context after the leafy Somerton Road which boasts many Victorian houses.

Merville House has undergone a £1.2m renovation and is now an important part of local Newtownabbey community life. Officially re-opened on 27 April 2006 by the prominent Belfast community activist Baroness Blood, the restoration project was undertaken via Merville House Limited, a company set up in 2001 by the Merville Residents' Association, one of the oldest residents groups in Northern Ireland, to formally garner funding from North Belfast Local Strategy Partnership, Newtownabbey Local Strategy Partnership, Newtownabbey Borough Council, International Fund for Ireland and Ulster Garden Villages Limited, as well as from other sources.

== Notable occupants ==
To reflect the history of the original Merville estate, the principal rooms in the house are named after some of the families that have an affiliation with the estate. These families are:

Donegall Suite Sir Arthur Chichester (1739–99), the 5th Earl of Donegall and 1st Marquis of Donegall. He was created Baron Fisherwick in the peerage of Great Britain in 1790 and Baron of Belfast and marquis of Donegall in the peerage of Ireland the following year.

The previous inference has suggested that he probably built Merville as a bolthole for contemplation and leisurely pursuits. But the actual reason why a room at Merville House is named after a member of the Donegall dynasty is that Chichester was the lawful possessor of the townland of Drumnadrough where Merville stands, as well as all of the neighbouring townlands that established the former civil parish of Coole or Carnmoney. His ancestor, Sir Arthur Chichester (1536-1625), was given the lands by King James I in May 1604 during the period of Irish History that became known as the Plantation of Ulster. The current incumbent of the title, (Arthur) Patrick Chichester (b. 1952), the 8th Marquis of Donegall, the son of Dermot Chichester LVO (1916-2007).

Rowan Room Soldier-turned-Resident Magistrate, Lt. Col. John Rowan (1778-1855), High Sheriff of County Antrim in 1814, come to live at Merville in 1823 after he married Dorothea Blair, the widow of the residence's previous owner, James Blair (1756-1820) of Newry, who died at Merville in November 1820. Throughout the 1830s and 1840s Major Rowan presided over proceedings at the weekly Petty Sessions Court within the village of Whitehouse and at Carrickfergus.

Merville was in the permanent status of Dorothea since 1800 until the estate was sold to the future Sir Edward Coey in October 1849. John Rowan was the eldest brother of Sir Charles Rowan KCB (1783-1852), the joint founding Commissioner of the London Metropolitan Police. The Rowans originated from Ballymoney, County Antrim.

Coey Room Wealthy provision merchant Sir Edward Coey (1805–87) is almost certainly the most illustrious of all owners of the Merville estate in regard to his wealth and standing in Victorian Ulster. Responsible for introducing cured ham to Ireland from the United States in the mid-1830s, Coey went on to be elected the first and only Liberal Party Mayor of Belfast in December 1860. He was also conferred High Sheriff of Belfast and Deputy Lieutenant of County Antrim. He died at Merville in June 1887 aged 82.

After his death, his nephew, also called Edward Coey (1847-1923), inherited Merville and its demesne. Taken as a whole, Merville was in the possession of the Coey lineage from 1849 to 1924. In November 2006, however, the Ulster History Circle, the heritage organisation officially recognised as the manager of Blue Plaques in Northern Ireland, erected a plaque on the front elevation of the House in recognition of Sir Edward Coey's notable charity work.

Robinson Room The distinguished Frederick Charles Gunning Robinson (1872-1934) worked for many years in the family pork processing business of A.T. Robinson of Shankill Road, west Belfast, before establishing his own provision merchants in 1905 under the trade name Fred C. Robinson Ltd after dropping Gunning from his full name. Operating from their premises at York Street, Belfast the business specialised in 'Ham and Rolled Bacon.' Fred C. Robinson died in England in 1934 aged 62.

After his death, his eldest descendant, Arthur Robinson (1900–93), took over the running of the family business and managed the Merville estate on behalf of his widow, Isabella Robinson nee. Gunning.

During the Second World War, the house and grounds were used as part of the British 'war effort' as Northern Ireland was strategically important to Great Britain, as well as acting as a lookout in support of the Atlantic convoys into Great Britain from the United States of America.

== The neighborhood of Whitehouse ==
The neighbourhood of Whitehouse, where Merville Garden Village is located, has changed dramatically since the 1970s. Part of Whitehouse today is one of Northern Ireland's retail developments that include the Abbeycentre, TESCO, Marks & Spencer, amongst other high street stores, as well as a sports centre, Valley Leisure Centre built by Newtownabbey Borough Council in 1977.
