= Warton Crag =

Hill near Warton, Lancaster, Lancashire, England

- Location within Lancashire
- OS grid: SD 494 730
- Coordinates: 54.1476°N 2.7807°W
- Area: 35 ha (86 acres)
- Designation: Site of Special Scientific Interest

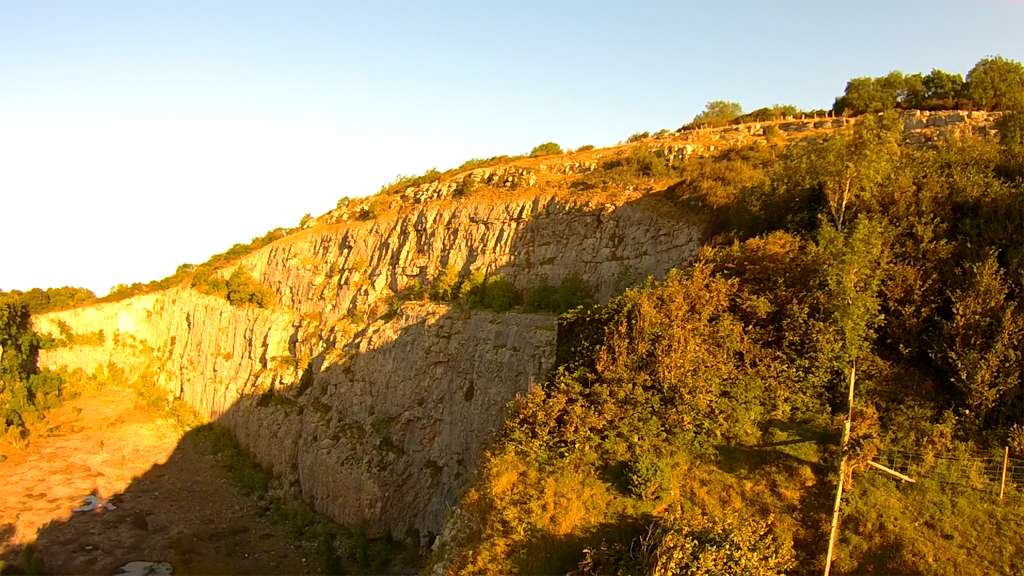
The disused limestone quarry at Warton Crag. Now a nature reserve used by climbers and walkers

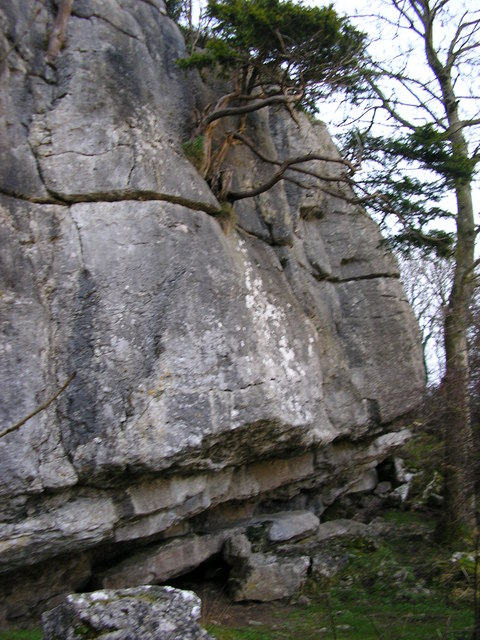
Pinnacle Crag, a rock-climbing area near the summit of Warton Crag

Warton Crag is a limestone hill in north west Lancashire, England. It lies to the north west of Warton village, in City of Lancaster district. At 163 metres (535 ft) it is the highest point in the Arnside and Silverdale Area of Outstanding Natural Beauty, and is listed as a "HuMP" or "Hundred Metre Prominence", having a "drop" or "prominence" of 126 metres (413 ft) with its parent being Hutton Roof Crags. Two areas are Local Nature Reserves, called Warton Crag and Warton Crag Quarry. Different sections are owned by Lancashire County Council, the Wildlife Trust for Lancashire, Manchester and North Merseyside, Lancaster City Council and the Royal Society for the Protection of Birds.

Two caves on the west side of the hill called Dog Holes and Badger Hole show signs of early human occupation, with excavations finding a range of artefacts.

The summit of the hill is the site of a small multivallate hillfort, which has long been assumed to date to the Iron Age period. The approximately 3.2-hectare (7.9-acre) enclosure was defended by rock scarps and steep slopes to the south and west with triple stone ramparts forming an arc on the other sides. However research by Historic England in 2016 using lidar proposed that the structure was instead "some form of non-defensive hilltop enclosure, possibly dating to the Late Bronze Age."

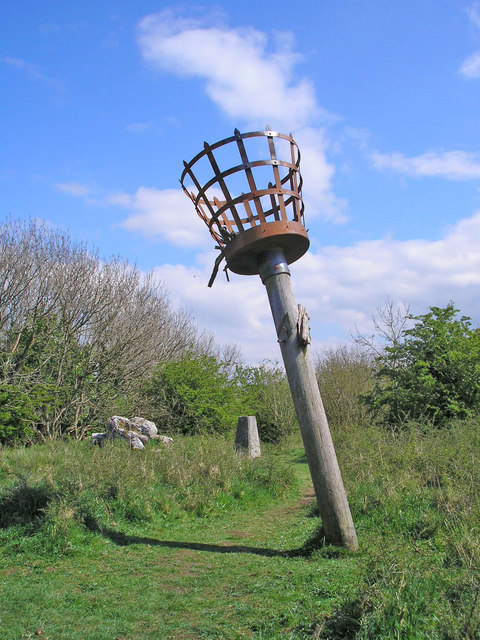
The beacon and trig point in 2009

A beacon was erected on the crag in 1988 as part of a re-enactment of the beacon chain alerting the country to the Spanish Armada, on its 400th anniversary. It was lit again in 2012 for the Diamond Jubilee of Elizabeth II, in 2016 for her 90th birthday, and in 2022 for her Platinum Jubilee.

Many plants are found on the crag, including horseshoe vetch near its northern limit, spindle tree and many ferns. The site is rich in butterflies, including the rare pearl bordered fritillary and high brown fritillary. Much of the hill is listed as a Site of Special Scientific Interest, being considered the best example of limestone grassland in Lancashire, with areas of limestone pavement.

The former quarry on the west of the crag is a regular breeding site for peregrine falcons and is protected by a Falcon Watch team of volunteers.

The crag is used by rock-climbers, and a fell race on the crag takes place annually as part of Warton Children's Sports Day.

== See also ==
- Scheduled monuments in Lancashire
- Leighton Hall
- Leighton Moss RSPB reserve
- Morecambe Bay
