= Listed buildings in Silverdale =

Listed buildings in Silverdale may refer to:

- Listed buildings in Silverdale, Lancashire
- Listed buildings in Silverdale, Staffordshire
