= Hazelwood Hall =

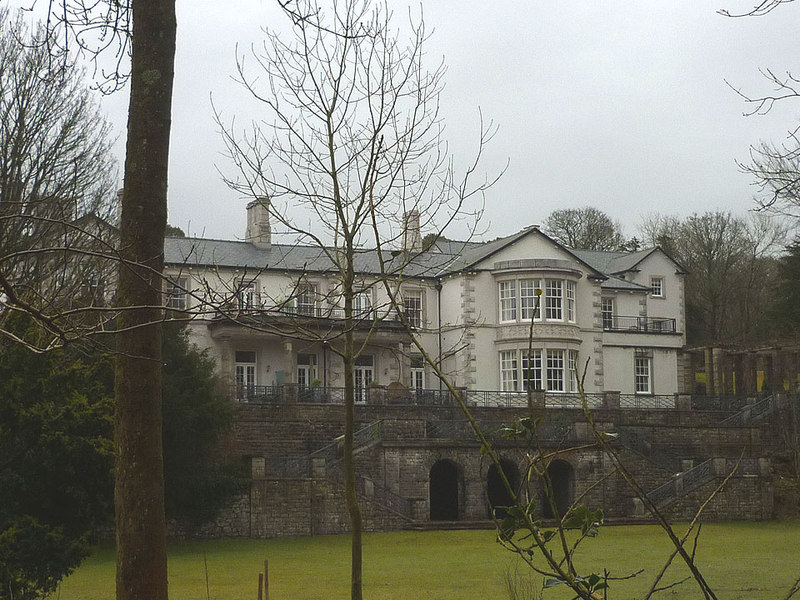

- Location within the City of Lancaster district
- Former names: Hill Top
- Alternative names: Hazlewood Hall

General information
- Type: English country house
- Location: Silverdale, Lancashire, England
- Coordinates: 54.1670°N 2.8270°W

Hazelwood Hall, sometimes spelt Hazlewood, is a nineteenth-century country house set in 18.5 acres of woodland and gardens in the village of Silverdale, Lancashire, England, 8.5 miles (13.7 km) north of Lancaster. The building was converted into holiday flats in 2006.

== History ==
A planning application in 2009 stated that the house was built "in the first half of the nineteenth century, that it is thought to have been designed by George Webster, and that "It is not listed, but is of some architectural interest".

It is in the Arnside and Silverdale Area of Outstanding Natural Beauty (AONB). A report on the AONB notes Hazelwood as one of "six [sites in the AONB] that may be considered to be of national or international significance". The Sustainability Appraisal Report for the AONB describes it as one of the "Historic designed landscapes" in the area which are "of exceptional interest and quality [and] compare favourably with those on English Heritage’s National Register of Parks and Gardens. Much of the land around Hazelwood Hall is owned by the National Trust.

The garden was designed by Thomas Mawson and his son, Edward.

In the 1920s, the house and grounds were rented to the Carrington family, who bought it in 1945. The artist Leonora Carrington used to visit her relatives there.

In the 1970s, the property was a nursing home under the auspices of St. John of God. It was an early provider of palliative care.

The property was used as a convent and a nursing home.

The house was turned into holiday flats in 2006.

In 2009, the developers applied to Lancaster City Council to remove the condition that the houses could only be used for holidays, because the company "has found it difficult to market holiday accommodation in the present difficult financial climate". The application was refused.
