= Matchless (pleasure yacht) =

Boat sunk in 1894 in Morecambe Bay, England

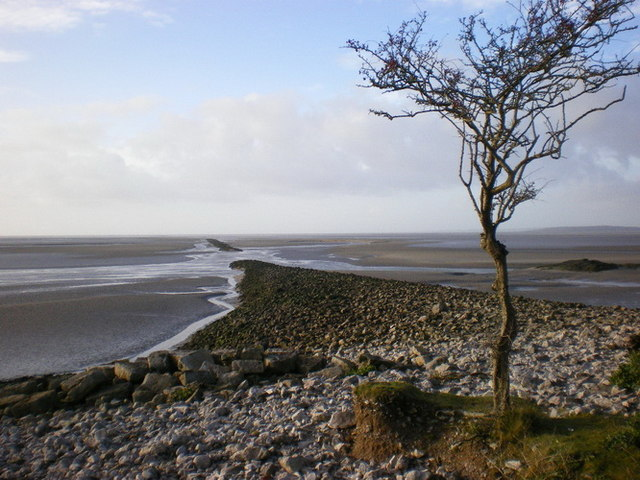
Jenny Brown's Point in 2008, scene of the loss of the Matchless in 1894

The Matchless was a British sailing boat which sank in Morecambe Bay, off north west England, in 1894 with the loss of 25 lives.

== Boat ==
The Matchless was a Lancashire nobby sailing boat, used for fishing in winter and for pleasure trips in summer. It was 33 feet (10 m) long, of tonnage about 5 tons, and had mainsail, foresail, topsail and jib. It had been built by a Mr Woodhouse in Overton in 1877. On the day of the disaster, as was usual except in rough weather, it was operated by a single boatman, its owner Samuel Houghton, aged 54 and an experienced skipper.

== Sinking ==
On 3 September 1894, Houghton and 33 passengers left Morecambe to sail to Grange-over-Sands. Off Jenny Brown's Point, Silverdale, the vessel was caught in a strong gust of wind and capsized. Accompanying boats rescued Houghton and eight passengers; 25 passengers died. Bodies were recovered from a wide area of the bay, as far as Ulverston, the last being found at Grange-over-Sands on 14 January 1895.

The dead were holidaymakers, from the industrial towns of Lancashire and Yorkshire: the largest number being twelve from Burnley.

== Inquests ==
An inquest was held in Morecambe on the two mornings after the sinking, 4 and 5 September 1894 and reported in The Times of London. The verdict was that the dead were "accidentally drowned". No mention was made of whether the town's arrangements for the licensing of pleasure vessels might have contributed to the tragedy. The foreman of the jury was the chairman of the local authority, so had an interest in maintaining the town's reputation as a safe resort for holidaymakers. There was criticism of the speed with which the inquest had been held, giving families no time to hear the news and make arrangements to attend. The inquest has been described as "A total whitewash".

There were several further inquests as more bodies were found; notably, at an inquest held in Arnside, then in the county of Westmorland, the coroner informed the jury that he had already written the verdict and asked them to agree with it.

== Aftermath ==
In 1895, the town of Morecambe introduced new by-laws for the regulation of pleasure boats, specifying maximum passenger numbers for each boat for both calm and stormy days (a flag being flown each day to show the day's category), a second crew member to be employed for all trips above six miles (9.7 km), and lifebelts and lifelines to be carried on all sailing vessels.
