= Warton, Lancaster =

Village in Lancashire, England

Coordinates: 54.147°N 2.766°W

Warton
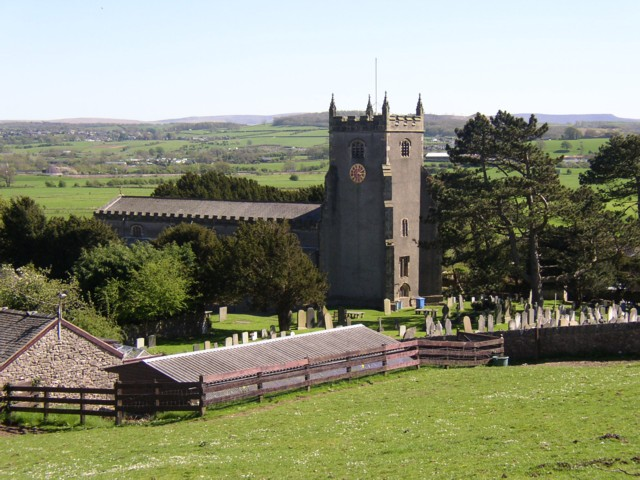
- St Oswald's Church

- Location in the City of Lancaster district Location within Lancashire
- Population: 2,323 (2021)
- OS grid reference: SD500726
- Civil parish: Warton
- District: Lancaster
- Shire county: Lancashire
- Region: North West
- Country: England
- Sovereign state: United Kingdom
- Post town: CARNFORTH
- Postcode district: LA5
- Dialling code: 01524
- Police: Lancashire
- Fire: Lancashire
- Ambulance: North West
- UK Parliament: Morecambe and Lunesdale

Warton is a village, civil parish and electoral ward in the Lancaster district of Lancashire, England. The village is close to the boundary with Cumbria, and approximately 1.5 miles (2.4 km) north of Carnforth, which was originally part of the parish of Warton. The village had a population of 2,315 at the 2001 census, and 2,360 at the 2011 census. In 2021 its population was 2,323. The parish covers an area in excess of 11,000 acres (45 km^{2}) and is predominantly rural.

The earliest record of the Warton is in the Domesday Book of 1086. The village contains Warton Old Rectory, the ruins of a late thirteenth- or early fourteenth-century clergyman's house. The parish church, dedicated to Saint Oswald, has links to the Washington family, the ancestors of the first president of the United States of America, George Washington.

== History ==
The exact origins of St Oswald's Church (formerly Holy Trinity) and its associated parish are unknown. It is believed that the church in this parish was established well before the Norman Conquest in 1066. The oldest portion of the church is the south wall which is of 14th-century origin, though the earliest recorded incumbent dates from 1190.

By the start of the 13th century, Warton had developed into an important staging post on the route north to Carlisle, Northumbria and Scotland. So much so, it was granted a charter for a Wednesday market, gallows and ordeal pit in 1200 during the reign of King John. The grant of borough status by the town's lord, the baron of Kendal, later in the 13th century confirmed the economic importance of Warton at that period.

The oldest surviving building other than the church is the ruined rectory, built around 1267; records exist of work being carried out on the rectory until 1332. The ruins are in good condition with the gables surviving to almost their original height (around 30 ft). Now in the care of English Heritage, it is a rare survival of a large 14th-century stone house with great hall and chambers. It served as a residence and courthouse for the wealthy and powerful rectors of Warton.

Warton is the birthplace of the medieval ancestors of George Washington, the first popularly elected President of the United States. Lawrence Washington, seven generations prior to George Washington and his family, arrived in Warton around 1300, and Robert Washington, Lawrence's great-grandson, is rumoured to have helped build the clock tower of St Oswald's Church. The Washington family coat of arms, three mullets and two bars, can be found in the church and is said to have inspired the design of the flag of the United States. The flag of the United States of America is displayed on the village church flag pole every Fourth of July. The flag was donated to the village after US soldiers had visited the village during World War II and having returned to the USA contacted their state senator about the birthplace of the Washington family. The donated flag had flown above the Capitol Building in Washington DC.

The village continued to expand during the 16th and 17th century, a large number of houses being built to line the backbone of the village, Main Street, running through Carnforth, Warton, Yealand Conyers and Yealand Redmayne

Until the 18th century, Warton was a minor provider of limestone quarried from Warton Crag. With the invention of the steam locomotive this industry boomed, causing Carnforth, the small hamlet where the local railway station was placed, to expand and outgrow Warton in a matter of decades. A number of the old 17th century lime kilns can still be found dotted around Warton Crag.

The advancement of Carnforth's iron industry and locomotive progress meant that Warton expanded as a place for the workforce to live, and a number of cheap terraced houses filled up the gaps on Main Street around the turn of the 20th century. By the 1940s Warton had two council estates, a large number of shops and at least two public houses. Warton has had a cricket club since 1907 and they were crowned Westmorland League champions for the first time in 2007.

=== John Lucas ===
John Lucas (27 January 1684, Warton - 26 June 1750, Leeds) was educated at the village grammar school and then moved to Leeds in Yorkshire to work as a schoolmaster. He became friends with historian Ralph Thoresby and between 1710 and 1744 worked on A Topographical Description of the Parish of Warton, and some parts adjacent in the County Palatine of Lancaster and Diocese of Chester. Interspersed with great variety of Observations from history Ecclesiastical, Civil and Natural extracted from Original Records, Manuscripts, Pedigrees etc. and many rare ancient and modern Printed Books, making use of Thoresby's library. In 1930 J Rawlinson Ford and John Alexander Fuller-Maitland produced an edited version which was published as John Lucas's History of Warton Parish (Kendal, Titus Wilson) and in 2017 Andy Denwood edited the work again, publishing it as A History of Warton Parish (Lancaster, Andy Denwood: ISBN 978-0-9957765-0-0)

=== The parish of Warton ===
The old parish of Warton included the townships of Borwick, Carnforth, Priest Hutton, Silverdale, Warton, Yealand Redmayne and Yealand Conyers. The current civil parish of Warton has boundaries established in 1935 following the division of the historic Warton with Lindeth parish and is surrounded by the civil parishes of Silverdale and Yealand Conyers to the north, Priest Hutton and Borwick to the east, and Carnforth to the south (the border following the River Keer). To the west, the parish extends onto the sands of Morecambe Bay. The parish includes Warton Crag, a limestone hill immediately north of the village. It is protected as a nature reserve by multiple organisations, and has archaeological remains which have been identified as an Iron Age hill fort or an earlier structure. The southern boundary of the parish follows the River Keer as far as Kellet Lane just east of the M6 motorway; the eastern boundary skirts to the west of Tewitfield, and the northern boundary passes through Hyning Scout Wood before joining Morecambe Bay along the outflow from Leighton Moss, just south of Jenny Brown's Point.

The lake, formerly a gravel pit, at Pine Lake leisure park in the east of the parish, is the site of Mourholme castle, recorded in 1216, which gives its name to the local history society covering Warton.

== Demography ==
The Office for National Statistics (ONS) recognises an area described as Warton Built-up area subdivision (BUASD), within Carnforth Built-up area, The Millhead area, within Warton civil parish, is not in the Warton BUASD but in Carnforth BUASD. The ONS definition of a built-up area includes built-up land separated by 200m from another settlement.

Warton electoral ward has the same boundaries, and thus population, as Warton civil parish.

2011 Census
Named area	Population	Area	Population density	Note
Warton civil parish	2,360	17.30 km^{2} (6.68 sq mi)	1,400/km^{2} (3,600/sq mi)	
Warton Built-up area subdivision	1,805	0.575 km^{2} (0.222 sq mi)	3,140/km^{2} (8,100/sq mi)	Excludes Millhead area

== Transport ==
The village is served by Stagecoach in Lancaster. As of March 2026 the 49 starts in Warton going to Lancaster running every hour. The 51 also runs through it going to either Carnforth or Silverdale (also running hourly).

== See also ==
- Listed buildings in Warton, Lancaster
