= Droitwich Spa Lido =

Swimming venue in Droitwich Spa, Worcestershire, England

Coordinates: 52.265918°N 2.145038°W

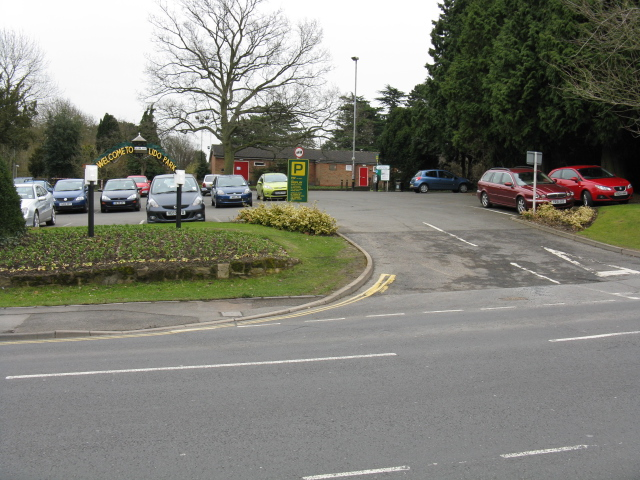
Entrance to Droitwich Lido Park

Droitwich Spa Lido is a heated outdoor salt-water swimming pool in Droitwich Spa, England. The lido consists of a 40-metre pool, water play area, and café. The pool measures 1.5-metres at it's deepest, and 0.1-metres at its shallowest. It is heated to between 23 and 26 °C. Brine extracted from under the town centre at the Tower Hill Brine Pump is piped into the pool to maintain its salinity, which is similar to seawater at 35 parts per thousand. It initially opened in 1935 but was closed in 2000. It reopened in 2007 following a local campaign. The lido is one of the few remaining inland, open-air salt-water lidos in the UK.

The lido is operated by the not-for-profit Wychavon Leisure under the brand Rivers Fitness.

== Brief history ==
The Lido was originally built in the 1930s to a design by Edward Prentice Mawson and the building features an art-deco style interior. The pool itself was filled with diluted brine, pumped from brine streams beneath the town. The brine was diluted at a ratio of 1:10 (1 part brine, ten times water) to replicate the same salinity as seawater. The salt in the water was strong enough to keep the water in the pool aseptic, without the need for additional chemicals such as chlorine, however chlorine is now added however improve water clarity.

When the lido opened, it was marketed as the 'seaside come to Droitwich Spa', and the pool was heated to exactly the same temperature as the Mediterranean Sea.

During the Second World War, the lido was closed, and its offices used by the military.

== Resurrection ==
The lido continued to be a popular tourist attraction. Even after its closure at the end of the 1990s, people still travelled for miles just to see the once-popular pool.

In late 2004, Wychavon District Council voted against the re-opening of the lido, which sparked a local campaign group to form, with the sole aim of seeing the lido restored. Called "Save a Lido Today" (SALT), the group put pressure on the various councils and even went so far as to provide a business plan.

In April 2005, the people of Droitwich Spa held a parish poll in which 98% of the people who voted were in favour of restoring the Lido. Following this, SALT continued to work with the District and Town councils to restore the lido to a working condition.

In the summer of 2007, the lido reopened. One of the schools in Droitwich, Westacre Middle School, was the first to be able to go into the pool. Although the diving area has been filled-in to lower the water heating costs, the original 1930s fascia was left intact.

The community group Friends of Droitwich Spa Lido (FODSL) continue to support and raise awareness for the lido.
