= Cumbria Coastal Way =

Long-distance footpath in Cumbria, England

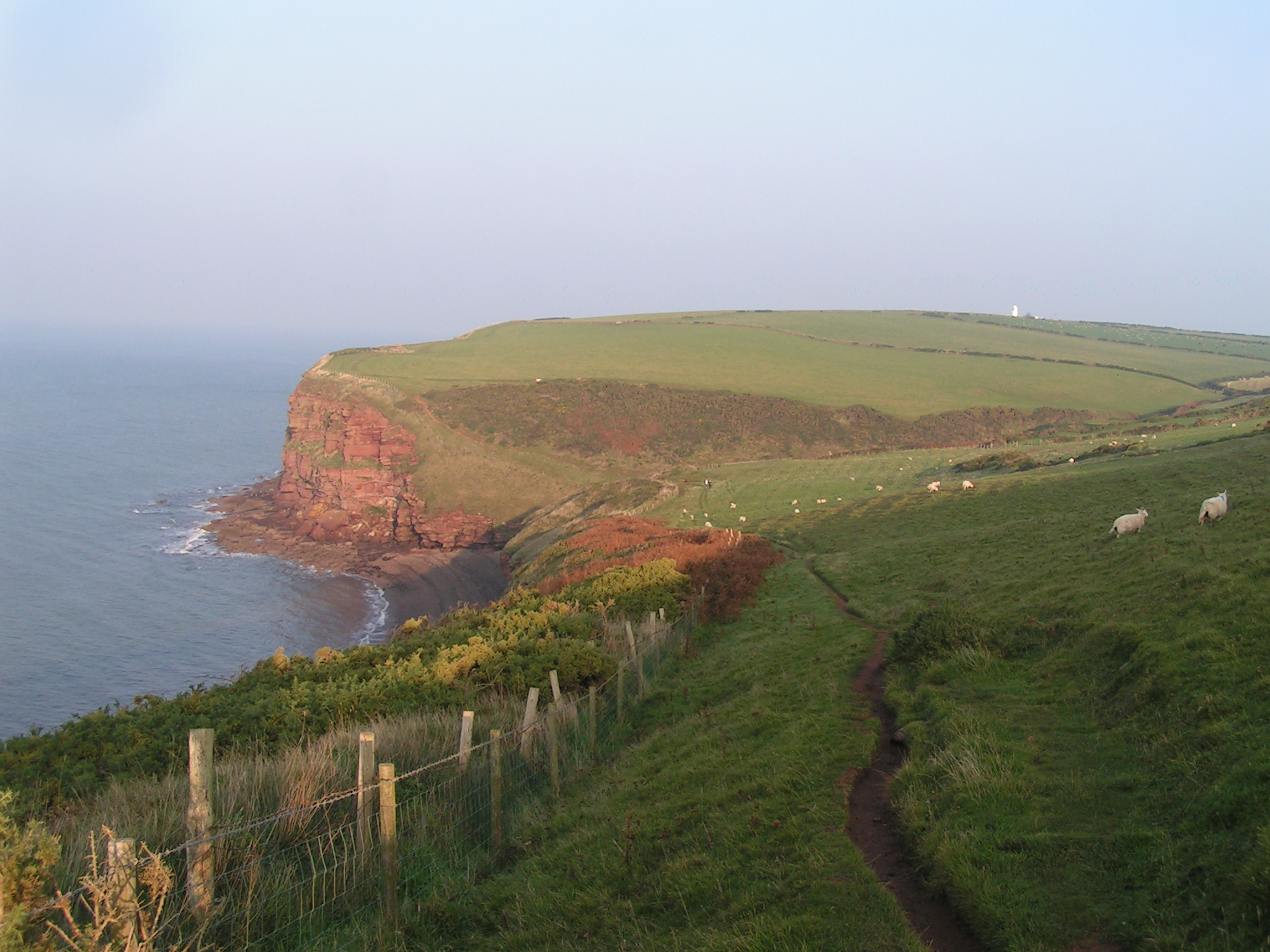
- St. Bees Head which lies on the trail
- Length: 298 km (185 mi)
- Location: Northern England, United Kingdom
- Trailheads: Silverdale, Lancashire; Gretna, Dumfries and Galloway
- Use: Hiking
- Season: All year

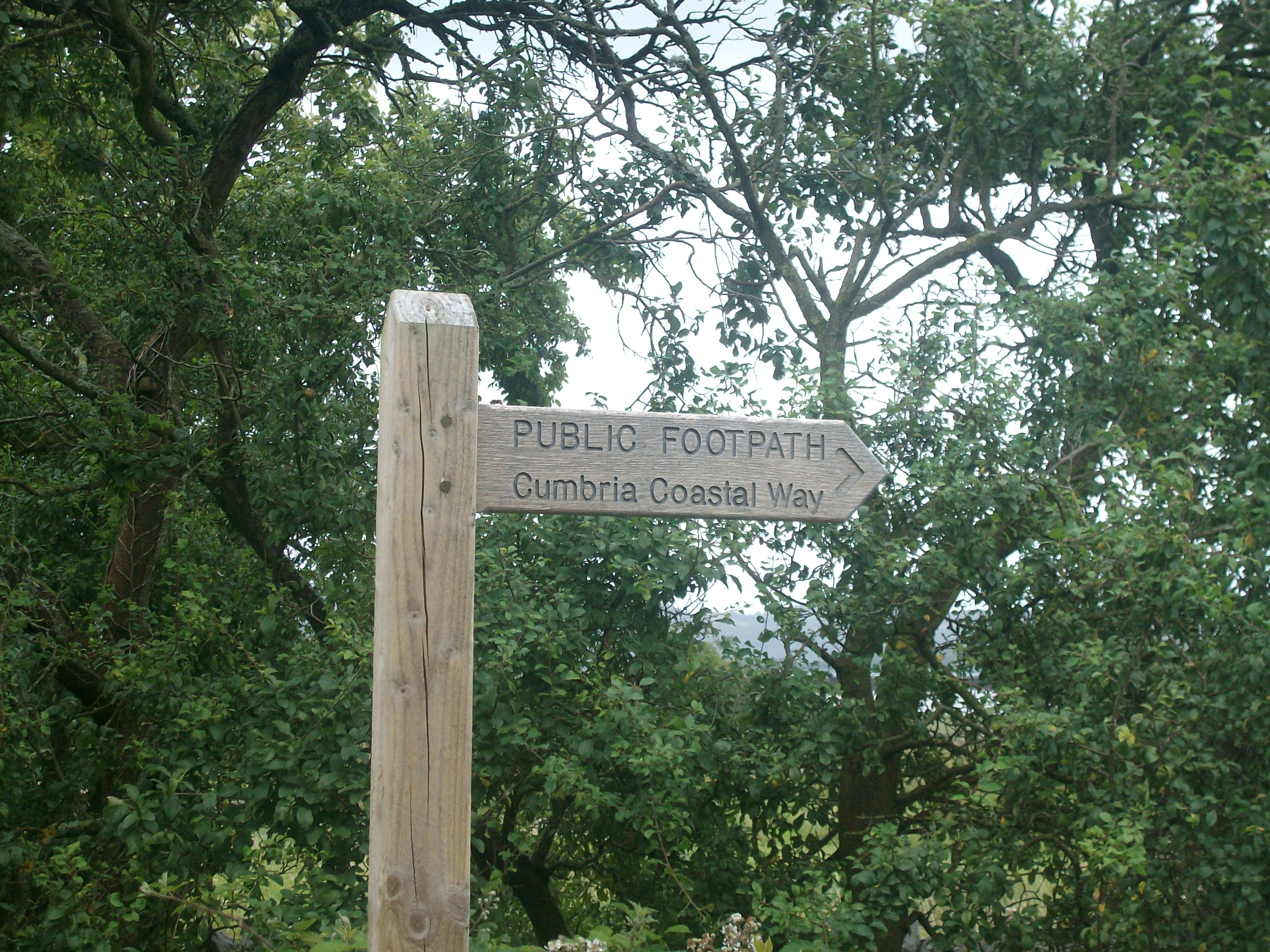
A sign along the route, near Ulverston

The Cumbria Coastal Way (CCW) is a long-distance footpath in Cumbria in northern England, following the coast from Silverdale, just over the Lancashire border, to just north of the Anglo-Scottish border. It is now part of the England Coast Path.

The Long Distance Walkers Association reports, as of 2022, that "The route is no longer marked on OS maps and is not endorsed by Cumbria County Council; some permissive paths no longer have access rights so diversions are necessary in places."

The path follows some interesting scenery such as the red sandstone cliffs of St. Bees Head. It passes through the following locations (from South to North):

- Silverdale, Lancashire - 54.167°N 2.827°W
- Arnside
- Grange-over-Sands
- Greenodd
- Ulverston
- Barrow-in-Furness
- Askam-in-Furness
- Kirkby-in-Furness
- Broughton-in-Furness
- Millom
- Ravenglass
- Seascale
- St. Bees
- St. Bees Head
- Whitehaven
- Workington
- Maryport
- Allonby
- Mawbray
- Beckfoot
- Silloth
- Abbeytown
- Burgh by Sands
- Carlisle - 54.895°N 2.934°W
