= Lindeth Tower =

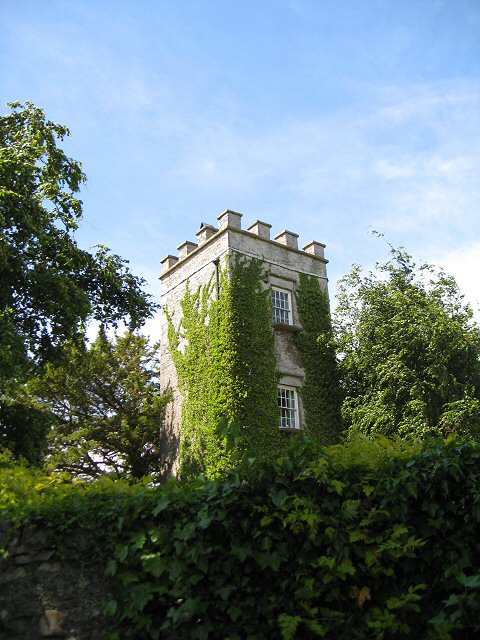

- Location within the City of Lancaster district

General information
- Type: Summerhouse
- Location: Silverdale, Lancashire, England
- Coordinates: 54.1603°N 2.8265°W
- Completed: 1842

Technical details
- Material: Limestone rubble
- Floor count: 3

Design and construction
- Architect: H.P. Fleetwood

Listed Building – Grade II
- Designated: 2 May 1968
- Reference no.: 1071845

Lindeth Tower is a Victorian folly in Silverdale, Lancashire, England. It is an embattled square tower of three storeys. It was built in 1842 by Henry Paul Fleetwood, a distant relative of Peter Hesketh-Fleetwood, the founder of Fleetwood. A slate plaque bears the wording "Erected 1842 by H.P. Fleetwood Esq". Elizabeth Gaskell stayed in the tower in the 1840s and 1850s and her novel Ruth was written there. Lindeth Tower is a Grade II listed building.

== See also ==
- Listed buildings in Silverdale, Lancashire
