= Listed buildings in Silverdale, Lancashire =

Silverdale is a civil parish in Lancaster, Lancashire, England. It contains 20 buildings that are recorded in the National Heritage List for England as designated listed buildings. Of these, two are at Grade II*, the middle grade, and the others are at Grade II, the lowest grade. Most of the listed buildings in the parish are houses and associated structures, or farmhouses and farm buildings. The other listed buildings include a former chimney, a church, a public house, and a limekiln.

== Key ==
Grade	Criteria
II*	Particularly important buildings of more than special interest
II	Buildings of national importance and special interest

== Buildings ==
Name and location	Photograph	Date	Notes	Grade
Waithman's House, Lindeth Road; 54.16301°N 2.82642°W	—	Late 17th century	A pebbledashed stone house with a slate roof, in a T-shaped plan. It has two storeys with an attic, a central porch, and all the windows are modern. Above the porch is a slate plaque, decorated with flowers and incised with names and the date 1739.	II
Slackwood Farmhouse, New Road; 54.16419°N 2.80643°W		Late 17th century	The house was largely rebuilt in 1713, and was altered in the 19th century. It is in rendered stone with a slate roof, in two storeys with an attic, and has three bays with a central doorway. Most of the windows are mullioned or mullioned and transomed, and there is one horizontal-sliding sash window in the attic.	II*
Bradshawgate Farmhouse and barn, Cove Road; 54.17473°N 2.82949°W	—	Early 18th century (possible)	The house and barn are in pebbledashed stone with a slate roof. The house has two storeys and three bays. It has a gabled central porch, and the windows are sashes. To the right the barn has a wide opening with a segmental arch, and at the rear are extensions.	II
Greystones, 3, The Green; 54.16746°N 2.81847°W		Early 18th century (possible)	A limestone house with a slate roof, in two storeys and with two bays. There is a central gabled porch with a mullioned window to the right, and a sash window to the left. The upper floor windows are casements.	II
19 Shore Road and barn 54.16631°N 2.83022°W	—	1744	The house and barn are in limestone with a slate roof. The house has two storeys and two bays, and the windows are sashes. The barn to the right has a wide entrance with a segmental arch and a doorway.	II
Bank House Farmhouse and barn, Bank House Lane; 54.16963°N 2.82883°W	—	Mid 18th century	The house and barn are in pebbledashed stone with a slate roof. The house has two storeys and two bays, with a parallel extension at the rear. In the centre is a gabled porch. Most of the windows are mullioned, and there is one sash window. The barn to the left has a wide entrance.	II
Brown's Houses, Jenny Brown's Point; 54.15440°N 2.82066°W		Mid 18th century	A row of houses in limestone with some sandstone dressings and a slate roof, in two storeys with an attic. The central part is the oldest, and contains mullioned windows and a gabled porch. The part to the right has sash windows, and the house to the left has modern windows.	II
Cottage and barn, Bank House Farm, Bank House Lane; 54.16952°N 2.82856°W	—	Late 18th century	The former cottage and barn are in limestone with a slate roof. The cottage has two storeys, and one of its windows is mullioned. The barn has a wide entrance and a pitching hole.	II
Bottoms Farmhouse, Bottoms Lane; 54.16972°N 2.81543°W		Late 18th century	The farmhouse is in pebbledashed stone with a slate roof. It has two storeys, two bays, and a central doorway. The windows are sashes. There are extensions on the right.	II
Fernbank, 17, The Row; 54.17496°N 2.81081°W	—	Late 18th century	A pebbledashed stone house with a slate roof, in two storeys. The house has two bays, with an additional bay to the left. The porch is gabled with a finial. The windows are a mix of mullioned, sashes and modern windows.	II
Tower, Jenny Brown's Point; 54.15493°N 2.81844°W		c. 1800	The tower is a chimney in limestone about 10 metres (33 ft) high. It is circular and tapering. There is a rectangular opening into a flue on the east side.	II
Tower House, Lindeth Road; 54.16053°N 2.82623°W	—	1816	A pebbledashed house with slate hanging on the front and a slate roof, it has an L-shaped plan, and is in two storeys with sash windows. Above the doorway in the north wing is an inscribed plaque, and on the ground floor is a conservatory. The east wing is taller and has a modern glass porch.	II
1 The Green; 54.16720°N 2.81895°W		Early 19th century	The house is in limestone with a slate roof, in two storeys and five bays. The left gable is slate hung. Most of the windows are sashes. At the rear is a gabled stair wing and an outshut.	II
Silverdale Hotel, Shore Road; 54.16679°N 2.82897°W		Early to mid 19th century	A pebbledashed public house with a slate roof, and with later extensions. It has two storeys and an attic. Some of the windows are sashes, others are modern. On the gable end facing the road is a porch with Tuscan columns and half-columns, a plain entablature and moulded cornice. In the roof are two dormers.	II
Gibraltar Farmhouse, Lindeth Road; 54.16062°N 2.82657°W	—	Mid 19th century	The farmhouse is in limestone with sandstone dressings and a slate roof. There are two storeys and three bays. The windows are sashes, there is a gabled porch, and above the doorway is a cornice hood. At the rear is a wing with modern openings.	II
Limekiln, Bottoms Lane; 54.17012°N 2.81562°W		Mid 19th century (probable)	The limekiln is built in limestone blocks and has a trapezoid plan. There is a segmental arch leading into a vaulted opening containing a brick-lined flue.	II
Lindeth Tower, Lindeth Road; 54.16030°N 2.82649°W		1842	The tower was built as a summer house, and is in limestone. It has a square plan with one bay on each side, it is in three storeys, and has an embattled parapet. The windows are sashes, and the doorway is approached by stone steps.	II
Entrance piers, Spring Bank, Stankelt Road; 54.16717°N 2.82416°W	—	Mid 19th century	A pair of piers at the entrance to the drive in limestone. They consist of truncated fluted Greek Doric columns on square blocks.	II
Entrance piers, West Lindeth, Lindeth Road; 54.16718°N 2.82778°W	—	Mid 19th century	A pair of piers at the entrance to the drive in limestone. They consist of truncated fluted Greek Doric columns on square blocks. The piers have capitals and conical caps.	II
St John's Church, Emesgate Lane; 54.17158°N 2.82383°W		1884–86	The church, designed by Ball and Elce, is in limestone with sandstone dressings and interior, and a red tile roof. It consists of a nave with a clerestory, aisles, a north porch, transepts, a chancel, and a west tower. The tower is in three stages with angle buttresses, a moulded west doorway, corner gargoyles, and an embattled parapet. Inside the church the stone carving is of high quality.	II*
