= Trowbarrow Quarry =

Limestone quarry in England

Coordinates: 54°10′35″N 2°47′48″W

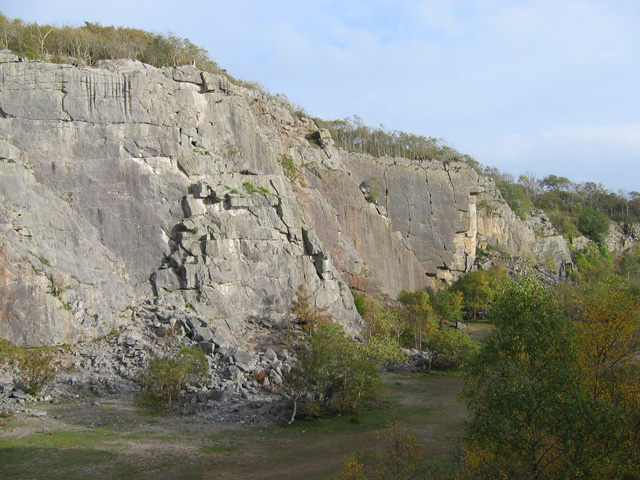
The main wall of the quarry in 2008

Trowbarrow Quarry is a disused limestone quarry near Silverdale, Lancashire, England, which is a geological Site of Special Scientific Interest and a Local Nature Reserve. It is a popular rock climbing area.

== Geology ==
This site is important for its microfossils from the Lower Carboniferous Urswick Limestone from the Visean Stage (Asbian substage ). Fossils include corals from Syringopora and gastropods from Straparollinidae. Microfossils of algae and foraminifera are also present.

== History ==
The quarry produced limestone for use in construction, industry and agriculture, starting when the Furness Line railway opened nearby in 1857, providing a means of moving the output. A new method to produce Tarmacadam was developed, using hot tar from the gasworks at nearby Carnforth to mix with crushed limestone. The quarry closed in 1959, having employed 20 to 30 men for most of its active life.

The site is now managed as part of the Arnside and Silverdale Area of Outstanding Natural Beauty.

== Land ownership ==
All land within Trowbarrow Quarry SSSI is owned by the local authority.
