= Edward Coey =

Sir Edward Coey (March 1805 – 26 June 1887) was a 19th-century entrepreneur and philanthropist from Larne in County Antrim. He helped fund the establishment of Larne Grammar School in his town of birth, and was mayor of Belfast.

Coey was born in Larne. His family had strong Ulster-Scot and Presbyterian roots. His first job was as an apprentice butcher. He started to build his own business, and became the proprietor of the 'Northern Shoe & Boot House' in Belfast, with his brother James. After a short period working in the US, Coey established a provisions and curing business in the dockland district of Belfast in 1841, called Coey & Co. This business was very successful, and led to Coey developing his business interests including property in Belfast, London, Liverpool and in the United States.

Coey represented the St George's Ward in Belfast as a councillor. In 1861 he became the first and only Liberal to serve as Mayor of Belfast. He opposed Gladstone’s plans for Irish Home Rule as being detrimental to the Irish economy. He was knighted in the same year in recognition of his public works, and in 1867 was appointed deputy lieutenant and High Sheriff of County Antrim. He was also a Borough Magistrate in Belfast, member of the Grand Jury and Belfast Harbour Commissioners, and in July 1869, was one of the eight founding subscribers of the present day Northern Ireland Chamber of Commerce and Industry.

He is remembered for his philanthropic work, the most notable of which was his donation to establish, together with John Crawford, a grammar school in his home town of Larne, which was opened as Larne Grammar School in 1886. However, Coey's philanthropic work was much more widespread than this. He was a donor to causes as varied as the Belfast Charitable Society, the Presbyterian Orphan Society, and the Presbyterian Sabbath School. He was Patron of the Belfast Society for the Prevention of Cruelty to Animals, the Belfast Sailors Home, and the Malone Protestant Reformatory, a life Governor of the Belfast Royal Hospital, a Governor of the Belfast District Hospital for the Insane Poor, and Belfast Ophthalmic Hospital.

== Family ==
Coey was married with several children. His son James was born in 1893; he served in the North Irish Horse in both world wars.

On 18 November 2006, the Ulster History Circle unveiled a blue plaque in his honour at his former home, Merville House, in Merville Garden Village, where he died on 27 June 1887.

== Arms ==
Coat of arms of Edward Coey

Notes
Confirmed 10 October 1861 by Sir John Bernard Burke, Ulster King of Arms
Crest
In front of a flag staff Proper the flag Argent charged with a sinister hand Gules a greyhound as in the arms.
Escutcheon
Argent per pale in the dexter hald an oak tree eradicated Proper in the sinister a fish naiant on waves of the sea also Proper a chief Azure charged with a greyhound courant of the first.
Motto
Droit Et Avant
