= Shanaz Gulzar =

British visual artist

Shanaz Begum Gulzar MBE is a British visual artist. She specialises in stage design and digital and installation work and has been a producer at the Manchester International Festival.

She was born in Keighley, West Yorkshire, and gained a degree in fine art at Leeds Metropolitan University in 1995.

She starred in the 2019 BBC Four series Yorkshire Walks, where she walked in scenic areas with a 360 degree selfie-stick to record her surroundings. She was an associate artist of the National Theatre Wales.

In 2020 she was appointed to lead Bradford's bid to become the UK City of Culture in 2025; the bid was successful.
