= St John's Church, Silverdale =

Coordinates: 54.1716°N 2.8238°W

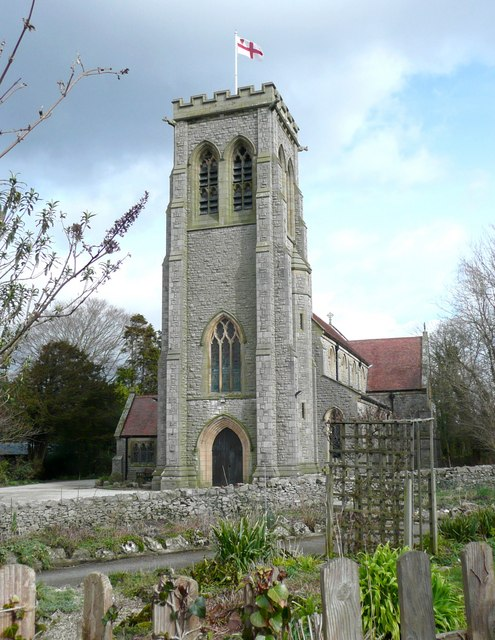
- St John's Church, Silverdale, from the west

- Location in the City of Lancaster district
- OS grid reference: SD 463 754
- Location: Emesgate Lane, Silverdale, Lancashire
- Country: England
- Denomination: Anglican
- Website: St John, Silverdale

History
- Status: Parish church

Architecture
- Functional status: Active
- Heritage designation: Grade II*
- Designated: 2 May 1968
- Architect(s): Ball and Elce
- Architectural type: Church
- Style: Gothic Revival (Decorated)
- Groundbreaking: 1884
- Completed: 1886

Specifications
- Materials: Limestone, sandstone dressings, red tile roof

Administration
- Province: York
- Diocese: Blackburn
- Archdeaconry: Lancaster
- Deanery: Tunstall
- Parish: Silverdale

St John's Church is in Emesgate Lane, Silverdale, Lancashire, England. It is an active Anglican parish church in the deanery of Tunstall, the archdeaconry of Lancaster, and the diocese of Blackburn. The church is recorded in the National Heritage List for England as a designated Grade II* listed building. It is notable for the high quality of the stone carving in the interior.

== History ==
There was a chapel in the parish before the Reformation, and this was rebuilt in 1829. The present church was built in 1884–86 and designed by Ball and Elce of Manchester. The chapel was then used as a mortuary chapel.

== Architecture ==
=== Exterior ===
The church is constructed in local grey limestone with dressings in buff sandstone. It has a red tile roof. The plan consists of a four -bay nave with a clerestory, north and south aisles, a north porch, north and south transepts, a chancel at a lower level, and a west tower. The tower is in three stages, and has a moulded west doorway and angle buttresses. In the middle stage is a three-light window containing reticulated tracery, and in the top stage are two two-light bell openings on each side. At the summit is an embattled parapet with corner gargoyles. The windows are Decorated in style, and those in the clerestory are circular.

=== Interior ===
The interior of the church is in sandstone. The arcades have compound piers and pointed arches, and there is an open timber roof. The carved stonework is by J. J. Millson of Manchester. It includes a statue of Saint John in a niche in the tower wall, roof corbels in the form of angels, and the capitals of the piers, which depict scenes from the Book of Revelation. The reredos was designed by Ball and carved by Millson. In the chancel is a triple sedilia, and the font is decorated with foliage, tracery and shafts. The furnishings in the choir, and the pulpit, are by James Hatch of Lancaster. There is stained glass in the south aisle by H. G. Hiller and Company dating from about 1926, and by Arthur George Moore of Liverpool from the 1930s. The clerestory contains a scheme of windows by Carl Almquist of Shrigley and Hunt dated 1891. The glass in the west window is also by Almquist, it depicts the Nativity and dates from 1886. The two-manual pipe organ was built in 1897 by Abbott and Smith of Leeds. There is a ring of six bells, all cast in 1886 by John Warner and Sons.

A glass screen between the tower and the body of the church was installed in 2013, to reduce draughts. It measures 6 metres (20 ft) x 2.5 metres (8.2 ft) and is an art work named "Revelation" by Lancashire artist Sarah Galloway.

== Appraisal ==
St John's Church was designated as a Grade II* listed building on 2 May 1968. Grade II* is applied to "particularly important buildings of more than special interest". The List Entry Summary states that "the interior is unusual for the high quality of stone carving". Hartwell and Pevsner in the Buildings of England series consider that "the carved work ... makes the interior memorable".

== See also ==
- Grade II* listed buildings in Lancashire
- Listed buildings in Silverdale, Lancashire
