= Cy Chadwick =

British actor

- Born: 2 June 1969 (age 56); Leeds, England

Cy Chadwick (born 2 June 1969) is an English actor, director, producer, and presenter born in Leeds, Yorkshire, England.

His most notable acting role was of Nick Bates in 720 episodes of the long-running British soap Emmerdale Farm from 1985 to 1996 and 1999. A year after leaving the series, Chadwick rejoined ITV Yorkshire as a director.

As a freelance television producer, Chadwick co-founded the production company "ATypical Media".

He works for BBC Entertainment and directed and produced the Young Professionals of the Year series for BBC Three. Chadwick also produced the Walking with..., Yorkshire Walks, Winter Walks and The Walk That Made Me programmes for the BBC.
