= Thomas McGrath (builder) =

Thomas Arlow McGrath (1896–1988) was a Northern Irish builder born in Lurgan, County Armagh, who founded Ulster Garden Villages in 1946 with the purpose of planning and building affordable, high quality post-war housing.

At least one of these projects, Merville Garden Village in County Antrim, still exists today. He and his two eldest sons emigrated from Lurgan, County Armagh to Canada in 1952 and were later joined by the majority of their family, leaving behind only nieces and nephews.

He died in Washington in 1988 at the age of 92. During World War I he utilized his carpentry skills by assisting with the repair of damaged aircraft. During World War II he owned and operated three ammunition factories in the Belfast area.
