= Merville Garden Village =

Housing development in County Antrim, Northern Ireland

Coordinates: 54°39′21″N 5°54′46″W

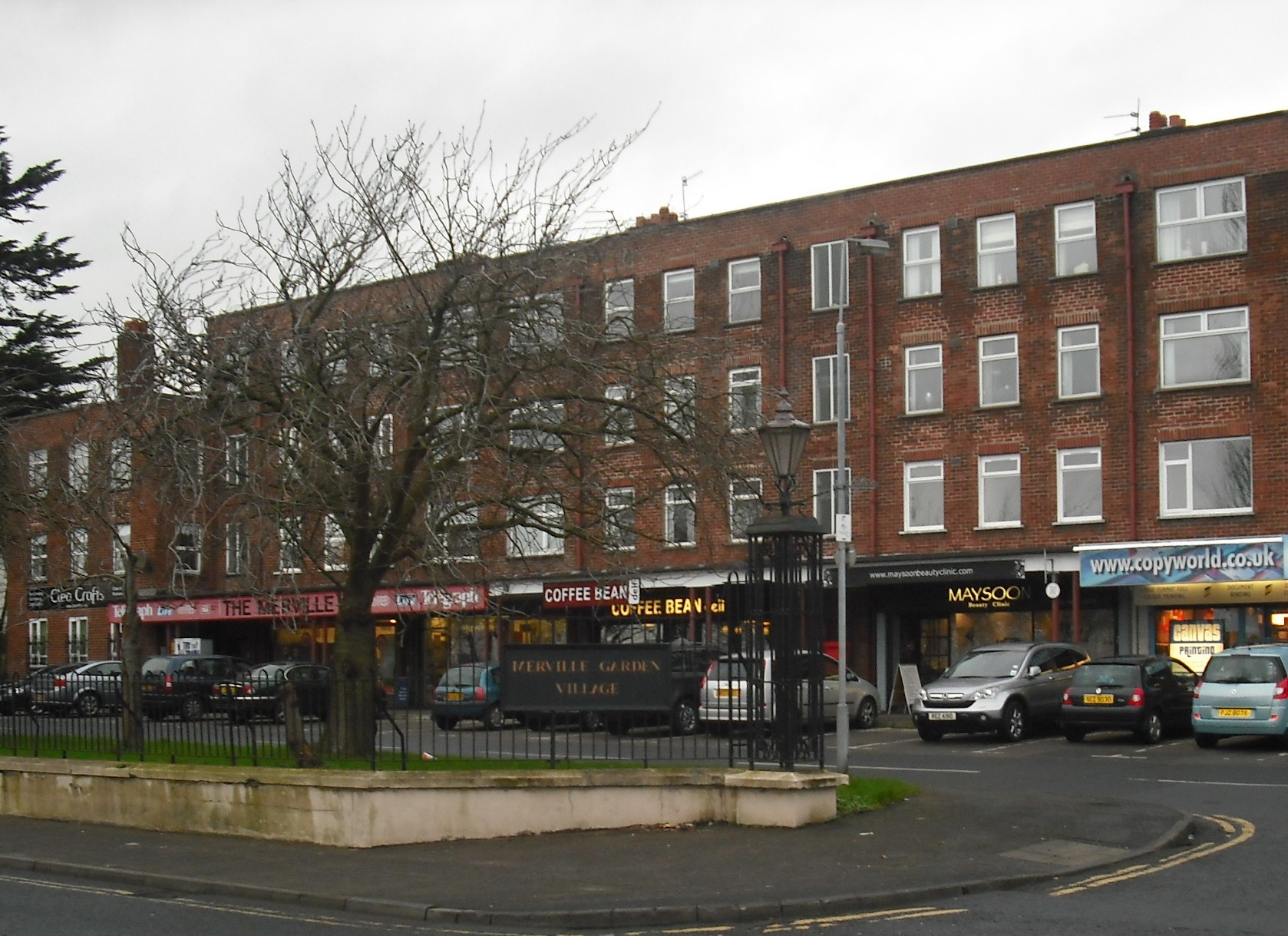
Entrance to Merville Garden Village on the Shore Road

Merville Garden Village is a housing estate located at Shore Road, Drumnadrough, Newtownabbey, County Antrim, Northern Ireland created by structural and landscape architect Edward Prentice Mawson. It was completed in 1949.

== Historical background ==
Merville was originally a private house, the modern-day Merville House, and estate built in 1795 by the Belfast banker and merchant John Brown (c.1740–1808). It was intended as his country retreat. Other fêted people would come to reside at the sprawling 24-acre shoreline manor. Between 1849–1887, for example, it was the home of Sir Edward Coey (1805–1887), noted as the first and only Liberal Party Mayor of Belfast (1861) and prominent wealthy businessman, who helped make Belfast one of the most prosperous manufacturing centres in the world during the 19th century.

During WWII little to no houses were built and Belfast was becoming densely populated. So in 1947-49 the Garden Village, the first such housing development in Ireland, was constructed. It was the idea of Lurgan-born builder Thomas McGrath who had established his company, Ulster Garden Villages Limited, in January 1946. Thomas Arlow McGrath was born into a working-class family in Lurgan in 1896. Having trained initially as a cabinet maker, and following service in the First World War, he formed a successful building business with his carpenter brothers, Andy and Bob. McGrath was an admirer of the Garden Village movement which had developed in England, listing notable examples of the work of various housing societies such as Bourneville and Letchworth, and commenting: “An important part of the policy of the housing society movement is that of giving every attention not only to the welfare of its estates, and care in the maintenance of its properties but to the welfare of tenants.”.

English architect Edward Prentice Mawson, eldest son of internationally renowned English landscape architect Thomas Hayton Mawson, became known to McGrath after being introduced to him by his site manager Jesse Williams, who previously worked with Mawson in England. Edward Prentice Mawson was the past President of the Institute of Landscape Architects, having originally trained at the London School of Architecture and at the Ecole des Beaux Arts in Paris. Mawson's philosophical approach to planning had a sound commercial basis and dovetailed well with that of McGrath: "Good design and beauty are commercial assets, quite apart from their psychological effect on everyone."(Mawson, 1934). Subsequently, Mawson was appointed the consultant architect of all of McGrath's ambitious Garden Village schemes in Northern Ireland. Along with Merville, these were at Abbots Cross, Fernagh, Prince's Park, King's Park, Muckamore, and Whitehead, all in County Antrim.

The Merville original designs consisted of 256 apartments, 28 cottage flats, 146 terraced and semi-detached houses, and a row of 14 shops. The building work was completed in 1949.

The design of Merville was widely praised: Stanley Gale noted in 1949: “In the Merville Estate in Belfast, the designer Mr E. Prentice Mawson has produced an outstanding example that should set a new standard in both layout and in the grouping and design of the units.” The estate was endowed with shops and a community centre (having classes in drama, singing, music and other activities). There was also a small theatre, and landscaped gardens included the original walled garden of Merville House, as well as various landscape features such as field boundary fragments. Merville Garden Village was designated a conservation area in 1995.

The original intention to form a strong sense of home and community became a deep psychological seed within the minds of those who lived there. By 1975 The Merville Garden Village Residents Association was formally constituted, having 249 subscribing households, and is considered one of the oldest resident associations in Northern Ireland today.

== Conservation Area designation ==
Merville Garden Village was designated a conservation area on 23 June 1995 because of its unique architecture and landscape and is the only neighbourhood in the borough of Newtownabbey to have this protection.

== Merville House restoration ==
In April 2000 Patricia Pepper, Jackie Thompson and Brian McNally began the restoration of Merville House when they met Belfast Regeneration Office officials, amongst others. The meeting with potential funders was initiated by local North Belfast MLA Fred Cobain after a chance meeting with MRA committee member Barbara McPhee. However, Stephen Hamilton, another Merville resident, joined the committee and formally set up Merville House Limited in February 2002 to help garner funding for the project. Other key players in the Merville House team included the late Jacqui Thompson, and Carol Magill and Colin Simms who assisted with grant applications. Carol Magill was Chair of Merville House and with her husband Colin and Patricia presented and secured the £1.2m funds for the restoration. The scheme was ultimately funded by Ulster Garden Villages Limited, International Fund for Ireland, Newtownabbey Borough Council, Newtownabbey Local Strategy Partnership and Belfast Local Strategy Partnership and a private donor. The house was officially re-opened on 27 April 2006 by Baroness Blood, a well-known community activist in west Belfast. Today Merville House is utilised by the whole community.

== 60th anniversary celebration ==
On 25 September 2009 a celebration was organised by Merville Residents' Association to mark the 60th anniversary of the completion of the village with guest of honour Thomas Prentice Mawson, the son of Edward Prentice Mawson. Thomas was a member of the original Merville design team led by his father. Other dignitaries at the event included incumbent Alderman John Scott, Mayor of Newtownabbey, and Tony Hopkins CBE, the head of Ulster Garden Villages Limited.

== See also ==
- List of villages in Northern Ireland
