= Leighton Moss RSPB reserve =

Nature reserve in Lancashire, England

Leighton Moss
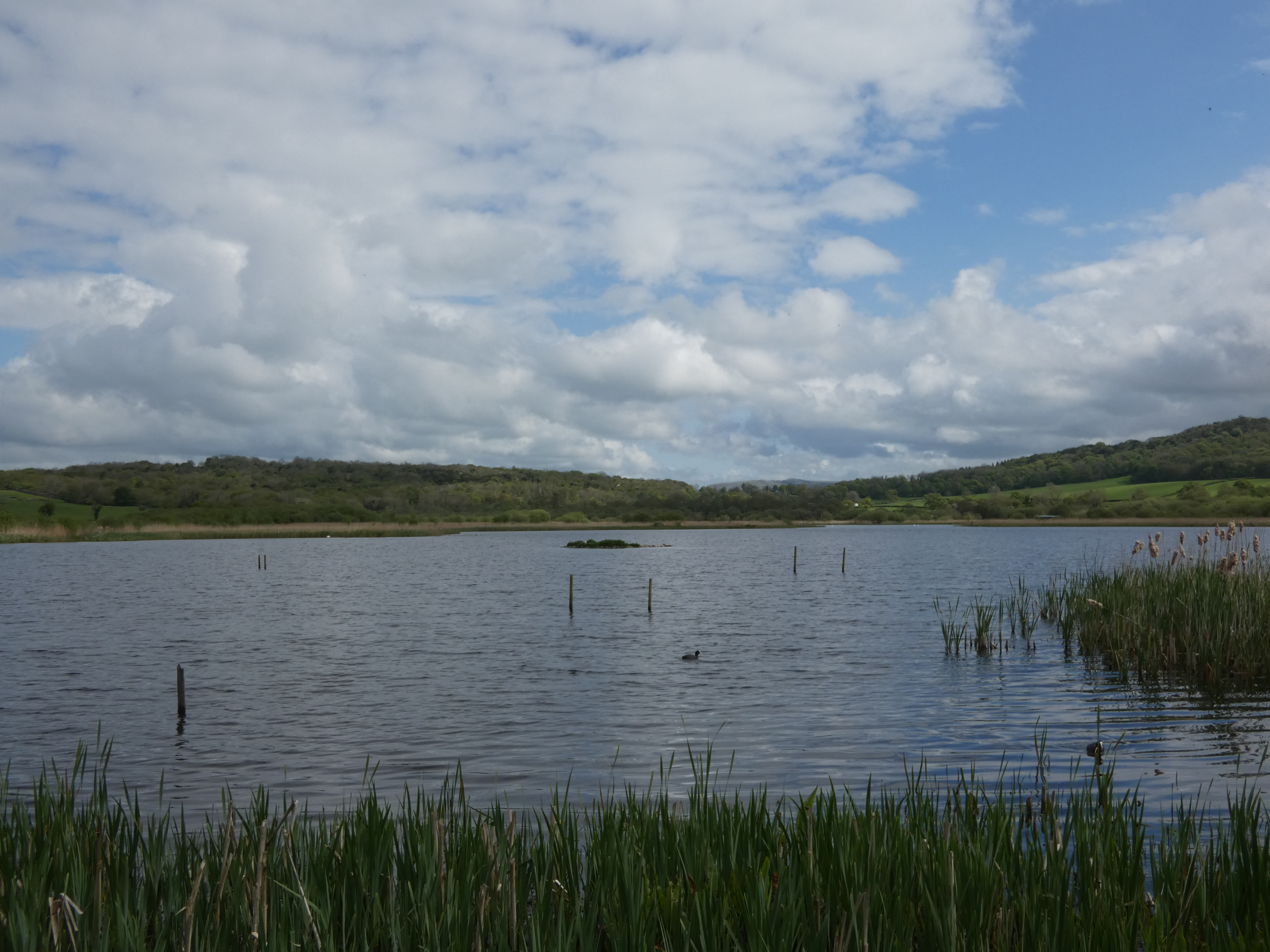
- The view from Causeway hide at Leighton Moss.

- Location within the City of Lancaster district Location within Lancashire
- Location: City of Lancaster, Lancashire, England
- Coordinates: 54.163°N 2.801°W
- Operator: Royal Society for the Protection of Birds

RSPB Leighton Moss is a nature reserve in Lancashire, England, which has been in the care of the Royal Society for the Protection of Birds since 1964. It is situated near Silverdale, Carnforth, on the edge of Morecambe Bay and in the Arnside and Silverdale Area of Outstanding Natural Beauty.

Leighton Moss contains the largest area of reed bed in north-west England. The site provides habitats for many species of wildlife, including bearded tits, marsh harriers, bitterns, otters and red deer. As a wetland of international importance, it was designated a Ramsar site in 1985. It is a Site of Special Scientific Interest, a Special Protection Area, and an Important Bird Area.

The RSPB also protects a large area of Morecambe Bay, where a saltmarsh provides a habitat for birds such as avocets.

== History ==
In 1822 the moss came into the possession of Richard Gillow, grandson of the Lancaster furniture manufacturer Robert Gillow. Using steam technology, Gillow drained the moss for agriculture. Although the soil is of good quality, by 1918 the land was flooded again, as drainage appeared to have become uneconomic when the price of coal was high. The area was used for duck shooting.

The RSPB initially leased the moss in 1964, before purchasing it from the Leighton Hall estate in 1974. The site was first opened to visitors in 1965 on a permit-only basis, receiving 375 visitors in its first year.

Despite owning the land, the shooting rights were still owned by the Leighton Hall estate until 1984, when they were sold to the RSPB.

== Facilities ==
The site is open to the public everyday except Christmas Day, with car parks, a Visitor Centre, shop (selling bird food, binoculars and nature-themed gifts), a cafe and an education room. There are a number of nature trails, seven wildlife watching hides and a variety of events.

Some of the seven wildlife observation hides were renewed in 2012 with funding from the Heritage Lottery Fund. One is named after comedian Eric Morecambe. A nine-metre high Skytower provides extensive views over the nature reserve. Plans were announced in 2024 to replace the Lower Hide on the site.

== Flora and Fauna ==
The site is well known for its breeding populations of bittern, marsh harrier and bearded tit. In 2021, it was reported that six booming male bitterns were present on the site. In the spring, a distinctive sound can be heard at the reserve, with male bitterns emitting noises similar to “the sound you hear when you blow on the top of a glass milk bottle” to attract a mate. Other regularly seen bird species include marsh tit, water rail and many wildfowl species such as common pochard and Eurasian teal. Red deer and otters are also present on the reserve.

The site is also known for its breeding avocet colony, with a record of 40 chicks having fledged at the site in 2012.

Due to its proximity to the coast, the reserve has attracted rarer species, with species such as osprey, Eurasian spoonbill, black tern and little gull recorded at the site on a fairly regular basis. Rare birds present at the site have included red-footed falcon, purple heron, Caspian tern, great reed warbler and Savi's warbler, whilst more recently, rarities have included American wigeon, great grey shrike, green-winged teal and European honey-buzzard in 2019.

== Management ==
The extensive reed beds are managed to prevent them from drying out and also to prevent saline intrusion from the coast. Despite such control of ecological succession, the breeding bittern population (measured by "booming" males) suffered declines in the 1990s and 2000s. Following extensive dynamic habitat management in recent years the number of bitterns is steadily increasing.

In 2015 there was controversy about a plan to cull small numbers of red deer, which create significant damage to the reedbeds.

== Media interest ==
In 2013 Leighton Moss hosted the BBC's Autumnwatch programme. The programme returned in 2014.

== Opening times ==
The reserve and visitor centre are open daily all year round (except Christmas Day) from 9 am to dusk and the visitor centre from 9.30 am – 5 pm (4.30 pm November–January inclusive). Entrance is free for RSPB members, and half price for those who come by public transport, bicycle or on foot. Silverdale railway station is just a few minutes' walk away. The reserve is on a proposed cycle way around Morecambe Bay.

== Gallery ==
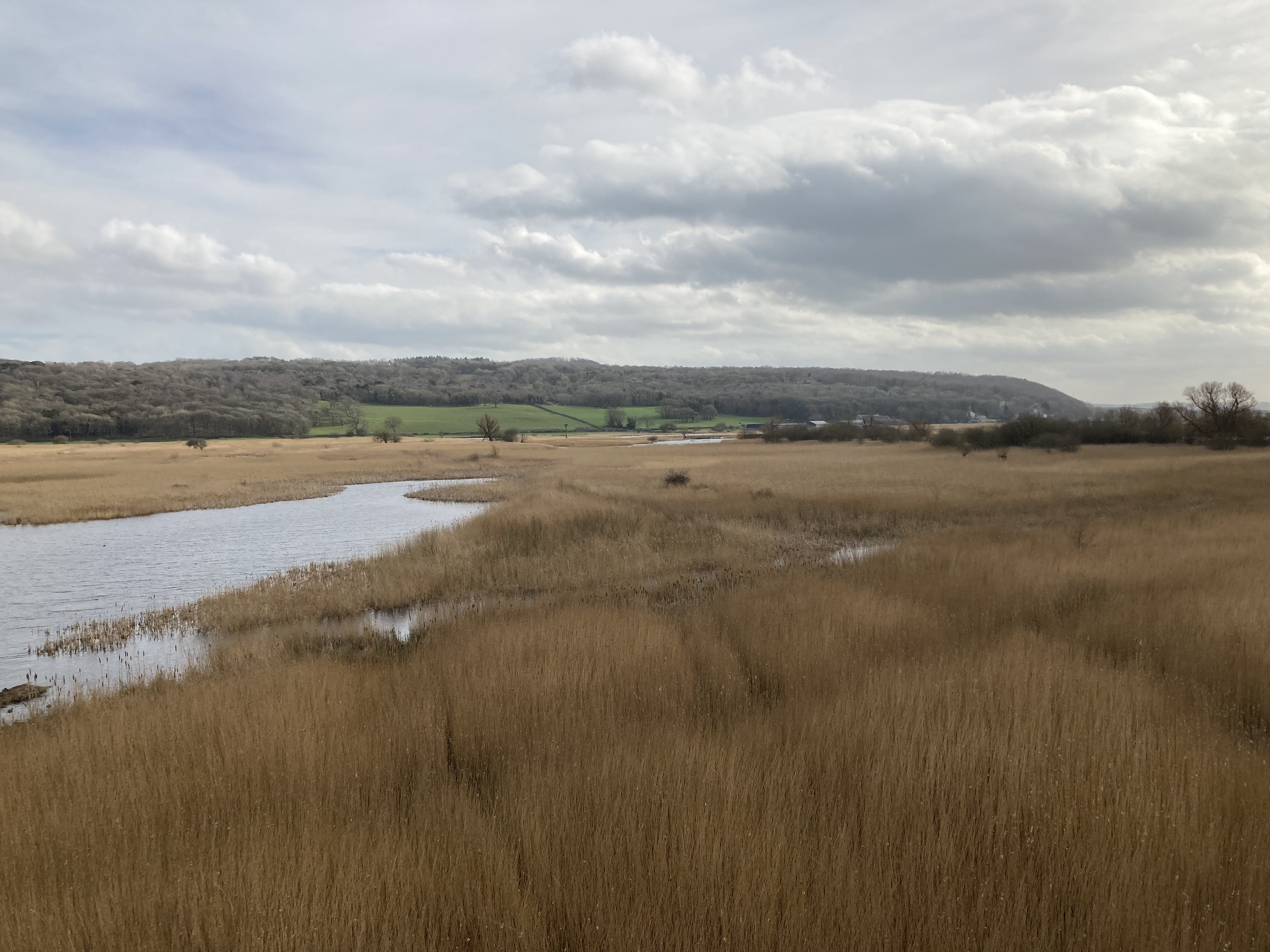
The view from the Skytower

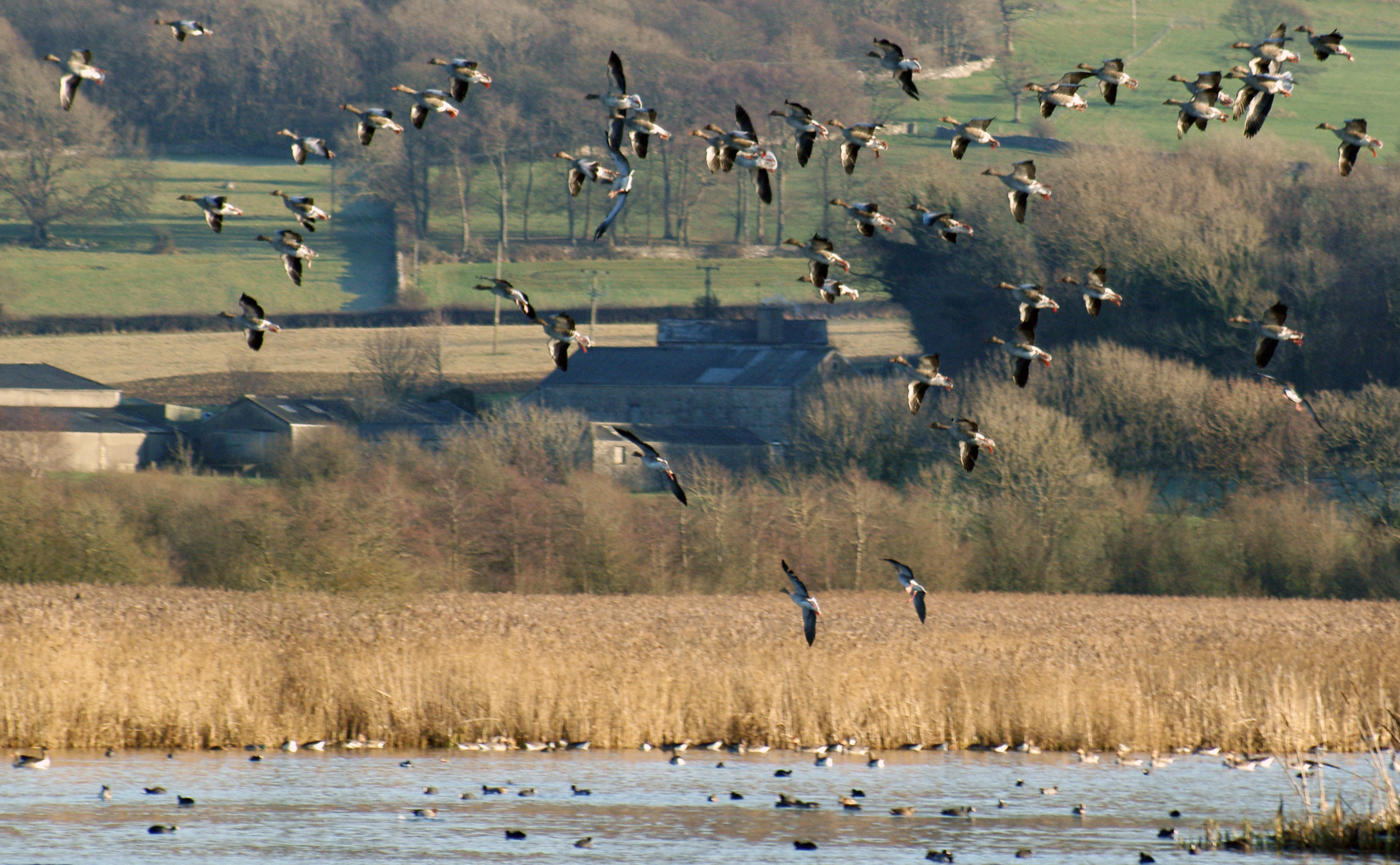
Greylag geese at Leighton Moss

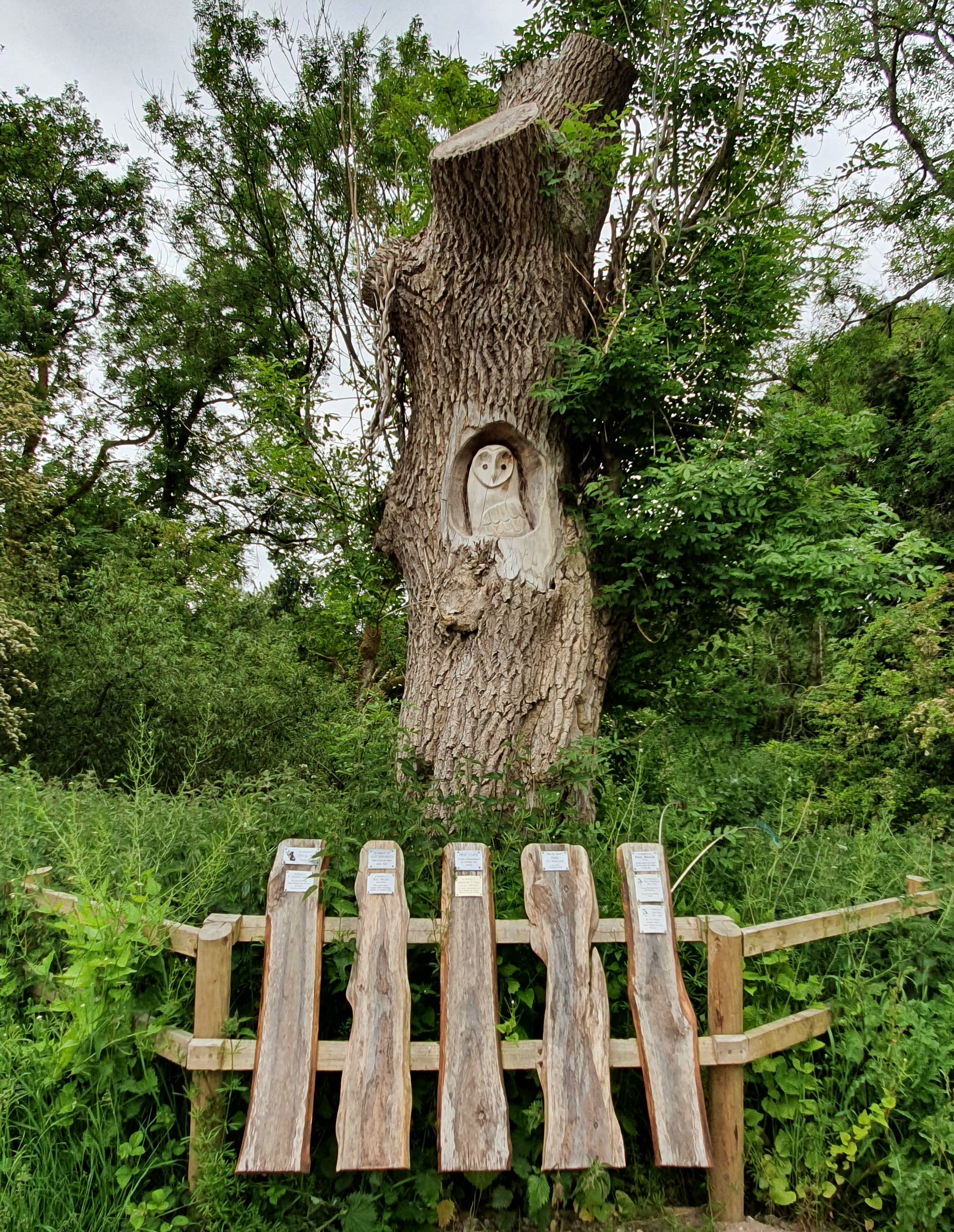
A wood carving by the visitor centre at Leighton Moss

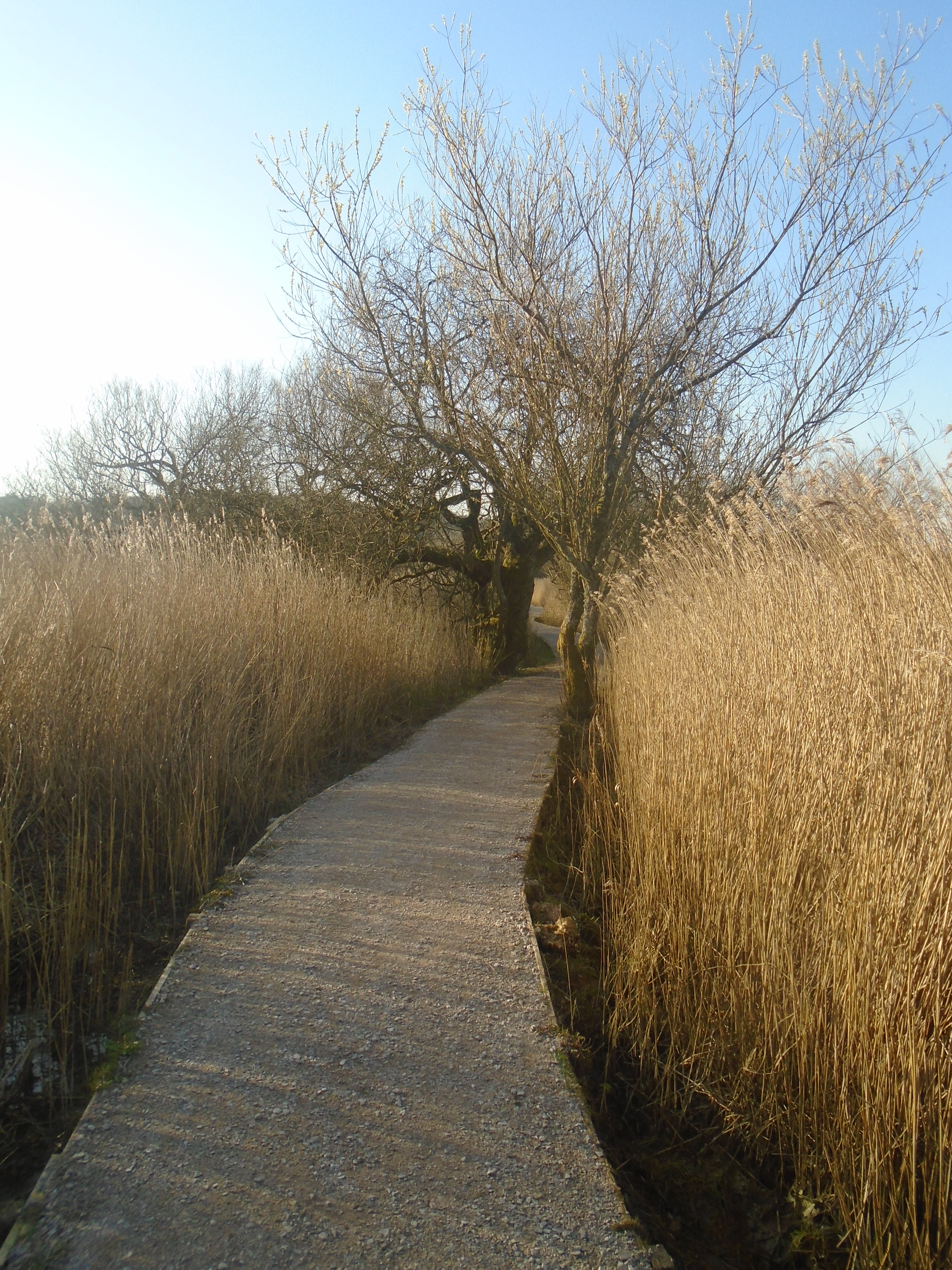
The reedbed path

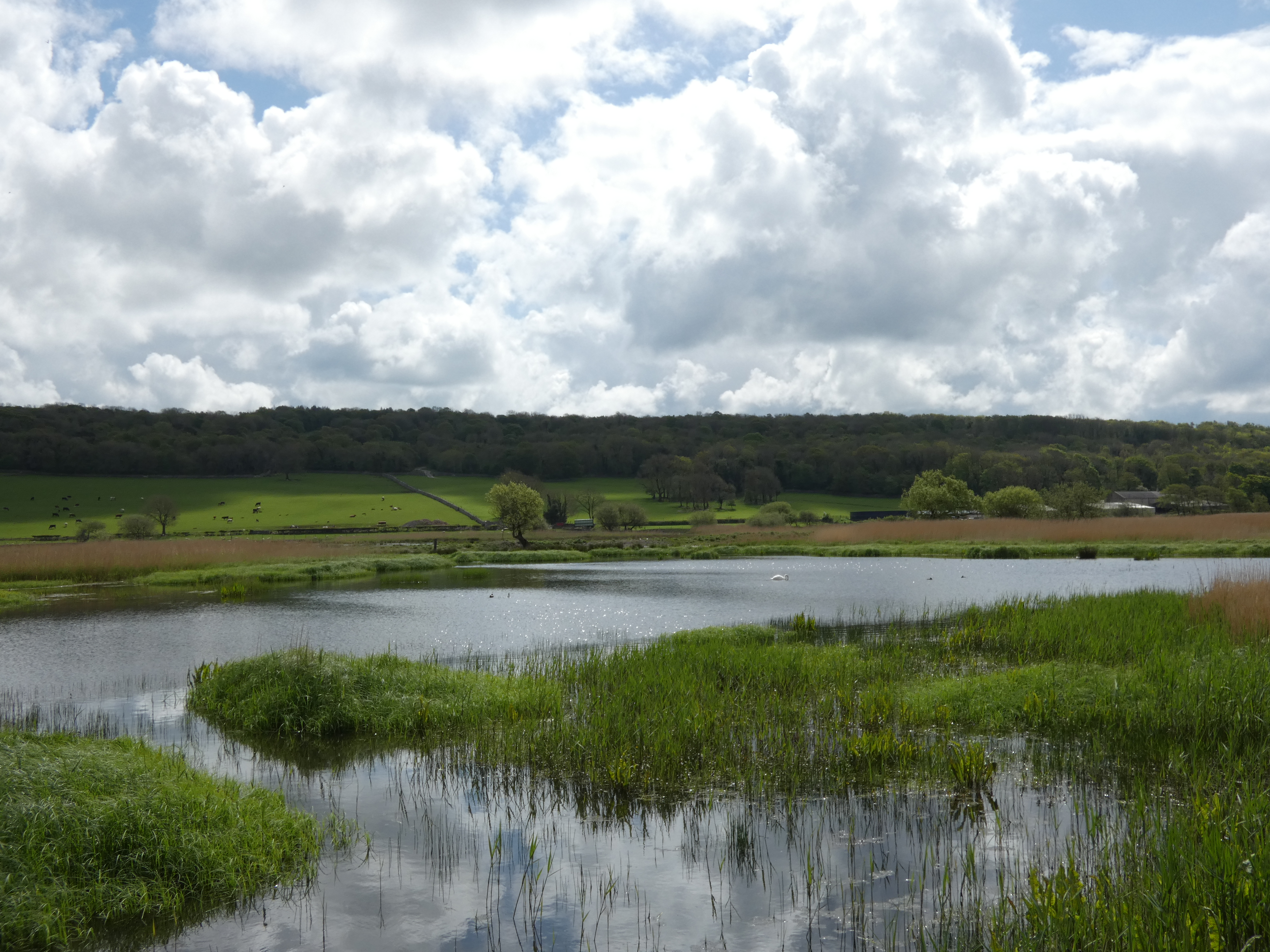
The view from Grisedale hide
