= Arnside and Silverdale National Landscape =

Area of Outstanding Natural Beauty in England

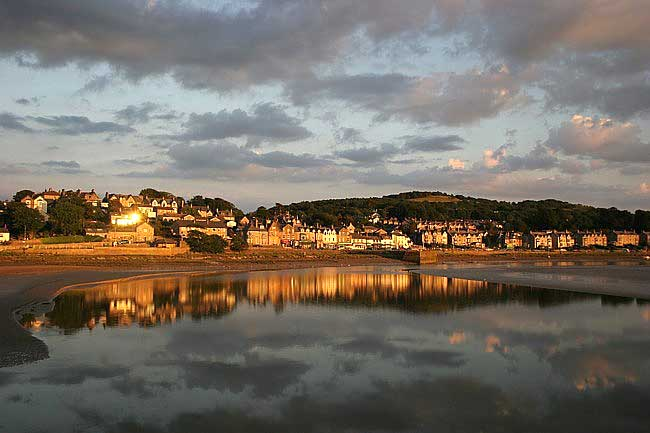
- The village of Arnside on the Kent estuary, with Arnside Knott behind

- Location of the National Landscape in England
- Location: Cumbria and Lancashire, England
- Coordinates: 54°10′35″N 2°47′29″W
- Area: 75 km^{2} (29 sq mi)
- Established: 1972
- Website: www.arnside-silverdale.org.uk

Arnside and Silverdale National Landscape (legally and previously known as an Area of Outstanding Natural Beauty or AONB) in England, is on the border between Lancashire and Cumbria, adjoining Morecambe Bay. One of the smallest National Landscapes, it covers 29 square miles (75 km^{2}) between the Kent Estuary, the River Keer and the A6 road. It was designated in 1972.

== Description ==
The area is characterised by low hills of Carboniferous Limestone, including Arnside Knott (522 feet) and Warton Crag (535 feet), interspersed with grassland. Much of the area is covered by deciduous woodland, in which ash, oak, and hazel predominate. The coastal area contains large extents of salt marsh, although these are under threat from the shifting channel of the Kent Estuary. The Leighton Moss nature reserve, owned by the RSPB, is the largest area of reedbeds in North West England, and is an Important Bird Area. The bittern, one of the resident species, has been adopted as the logo of the AONB. In addition, there are fifteen SSSIs in the area; one of these, Gait Barrows National Nature Reserve, is home to some rare species of butterfly including the high brown fritillary.

Arnside and Silverdale are the main villages in the area. Other settlements include Warton, Yealand Redmayne, Beetham and Storth.

== Landscape Trust ==
The National Landscape is supported by the Landscape Trust, a registered charity with over 1000 members. Its activities include ownership and management of several nature reserves and the production of a journal Keer to Kent.

== Principal summits ==
The following hills within the National Landscape have at least 30 metres of topographic prominence:

Hill	Elevation	Prominence	Grid reference
Warton Crag	163 m (535 ft)	126 m	SD491727
Arnside Knott	159.1 m (522 ft)	150.8 m	SD456774
Summerhouse Hill	126 m (413 ft)	32 m	SD501743
Cringlebarrow Hill	119 m (390 ft)	33 m	SD499754
Whin Scar	117 m (384 ft)	93 m	SD489790
Haverbrack Bank	109.9 m (361 ft)	44.1 m	SD485805
Middlebarrow Hill	91 m (299 ft)	60 m	SD463765
Thrang Brow	79 m (259 ft)	42 m	SD491766
Heald Brow	74 m (243 ft)	57 m	SD468740
Trowbarrow	73 m (239 ft)	33 m	SD481760
