= Jenny Brown's Point =

Headland in Silverdale, Lancashire, England

Coordinates: 54.1537°N 2.8281°W

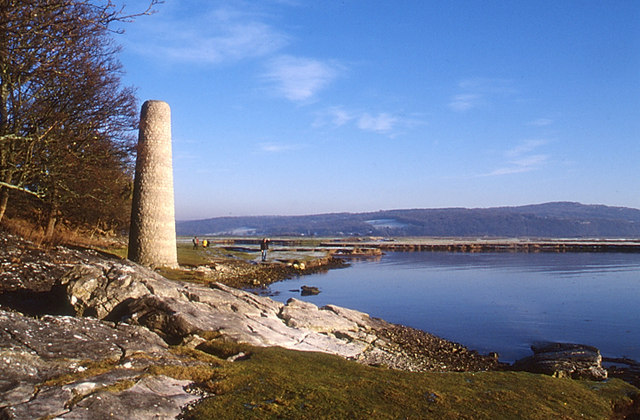
The chimney in 2006

Jenny Brown's Point is a small headland in Silverdale parish, south of the village of Silverdale, in City of Lancaster district, Lancashire, England, on the edge of Morecambe Bay.

== Name ==
The point has also been known as Brown's Point (1812), Silverdale Point (1818) and Lindeth Point (1828); the name Jenny Brown Point was in use on an 1829 estate plan and was used by the Ordnance Survey from 1848.

The identity of Jenny Brown is uncertain, though a daughter Jennet was born in 1628 to Robert Walling of Dikehouse, the farm at the point, and married Robert Brown (or Browen or Browne); one of their daughters was Jennet (born 1665), named Jennye in her father's will. It has been said that Jenny was a lover waiting for her lost sailor to return, a nanny who saved her charges from the tide, a lodging-house keeper, or a steam engine (or "jenny") sent to Brown's Point.

== Chimney ==
A nearby chimney, sometimes described as a tower, is grade II listed and has been the subject of archaeological and archival investigations. It is now believed that the chimney is most likely to be the remains of a short-lived copper mining and smelting project set up by Robert Gibson in the 1780s. He was Lord of the Manor of Yealand and incorrectly assumed he had the right to mine for copper at Cragfoot, inland from the point, on land owned by the Townleys of Leighton Hall. The copper was processed in a reverberatory furnace at Jenny Brown's Point of which the remaining chimney was part. The whole operation was abandoned in 1788 after lawsuits, and Gibson died in 1791.

== Walduck's Wall ==
Near the point there exists what is left of Walduck's Wall, an attempt to reclaim an area of land between the point and Carnforth: work began on the project in 1877 and ceased in 1879, and the stones were hidden under the bay's shifting sands for many years before re-emerging in 1975.

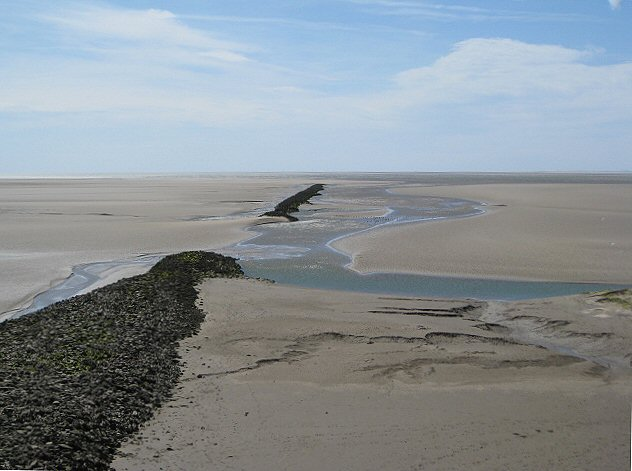
Remains of Walduck's Wall in 2008

== Other aspects ==
The 18th-century Brown's House or Brown's Houses at the point is grade II listed.

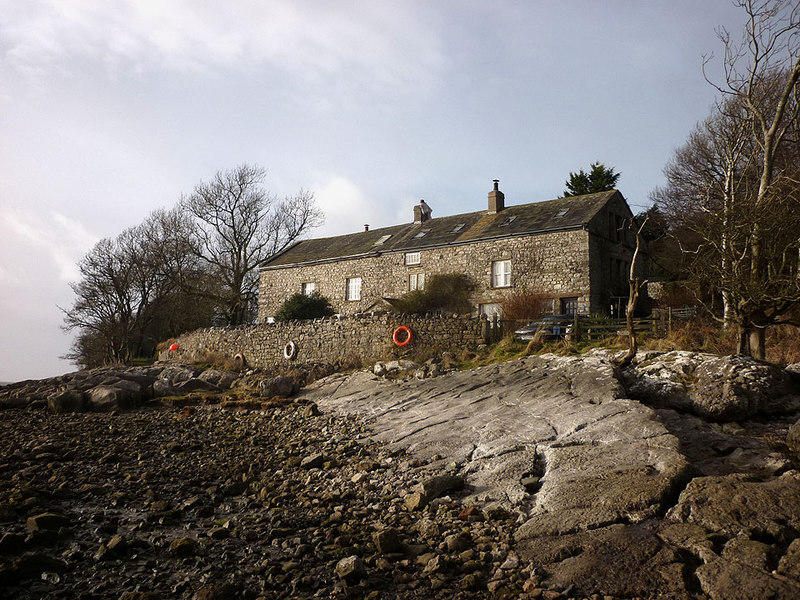
Brown's Houses in 2013

In 1894, 25 people died when the Matchless sank off Jenny Brown's Point.
