= Silverdale, Lancashire =

Village in Lancashire, England

Coordinates: 54.167°N 2.827°W

Silverdale
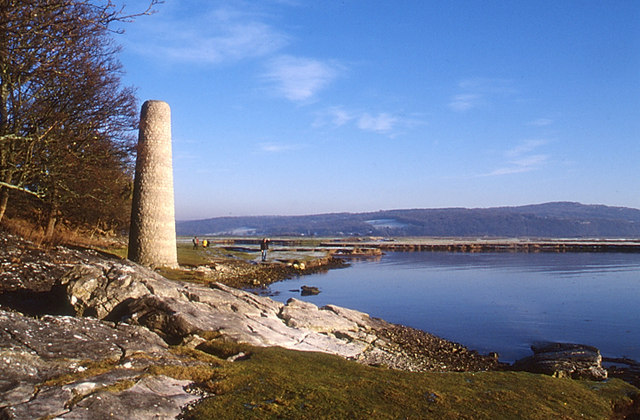
- Chimney near Jenny Brown's Point

- Location in the City of Lancaster district Location on Morecambe Bay Location within Lancashire
- Area: 12.41 km^{2} (4.79 sq mi)
- Population: 1,519 (2011)
  - Density: 122/km^{2} (320/sq mi)
- OS grid reference: SD460749
- Civil parish: Silverdale
- District: Lancaster
- Shire county: Lancashire
- Region: North West
- Country: England
- Sovereign state: United Kingdom
- Post town: CARNFORTH
- Postcode district: LA5
- Dialling code: 01524
- Police: Lancashire
- Fire: Lancashire
- Ambulance: North West
- UK Parliament: Morecambe & Lunesdale

Silverdale is a village and civil parish within the City of Lancaster district of Lancashire, England. The village stands on Morecambe Bay, near the border with Cumbria, 4.5 miles (7 km) north west of Carnforth and 8.5 miles (14 km) of Lancaster. The parish had a population of 1,599 in the 2021 census.

Silverdale forms part of the Arnside and Silverdale National Landscape (formerly AONB). The RSPB's Leighton Moss nature reserve is close to the village train station. The National Trust owns several pieces of land in the area. The former Tarmac-owned Trowbarrow quarry is now a SSSI and popular climbing location. The Lancashire Coastal Way footpath goes from Silverdale to Freckleton, and the Cumbria Coastal Way from Silverdale to Gretna.

== Governance ==
Silverdale is in the UK Parliamentary Constituency of Morecambe and Lunesdale, represented since 2024 by Lizzi Collinge (Labour), who defeated the previous incumbent, Conservative David Morris in the 2024 general election.

Before Brexit, it was in the North West England European Parliamentary Constituency.

Silverdale has a parish council, the lowest level of local government. In May 2023, six parish councillors were elected unopposed.

The village is in the non-metropolitan district of the City of Lancaster. The Silverdale ward includes the parishes of Yealand Conyers and Yealand Redmayne and has a total population of 2,035. On Lancaster City Council it is represented by one Liberal Democrat councillor, elected for a four-year term in May 2023.

Silverdale is in the non-metropolitan county of Lancashire. On Lancashire County Council it forms part of Lancaster Rural North electoral division, and is represented by one Reform UK councillor elected for a four-year term in May 2025. It was previously in Lancaster Rural District until its abolition in 1974 under the Local Government Act 1972.

== Geography ==
Nearby towns and cities: Lancaster, Carnforth, Kendal, Grange-over-Sands

Nearby villages: Arnside, Warton, Yealand Conyers, Yealand Redmayne, Yealand Storrs

=== Protected areas ===
Silverdale is within the Arnside and Silverdale National Landscape (formerly Area of Outstanding Natural Beauty or AONB). The parish includes several Sites of Special Scientific Interest (SSSIs), including: Eaves Wood, Gait Barrows National Nature Reserve, Hawes Water (not to be confused with Haweswater reservoir in Cumbria), Jack Scout, Leighton Moss, Silverdale Golf Course, and Trowbarrow Quarry, and the whole of Morecambe Bay is also an SSSI.

=== Listed buildings ===
There are 20 listed buildings in Silverdale. The parish church and Slackwood Farmhouse are grade II* listed, while Lindeth Tower, the Silverdale Hotel, the lime kiln in Bottom's Lane, the chimney or tower at Jenny Brown's Point, twelve houses (four with barns) and two sets of entrance piers are grade II listed.

== Demography ==
Census population of Silverdale, Lancashire parish
| Census | Population | Female | Male | Households | Source |
|---|---|---|---|---|---|
| 2001 | 1,545 | 807 | 738 | 687 | |
| 2011 | 1,519 | 779 | 740 | 696 | |
| 2021 | 1,560 | 801 | 759 | 707 | |

The parish had a population of 1,519 recorded in the 2011 census, This was a slight decrease from the 1,545 recorded in the 2001 census. The area of the parish is calculated by the Office for National Statistics as 12.4149 square kilometres (4.7934 sq mi), giving a population density in 2011 of 120 inhabitants per square kilometre (310/sq mi).

The ONS also identifies "Silverdale built-up area", covering the core of the village but not extending east of Bottoms Lane or south of Lindeth Tower, which has a 2011 population of 1,326, an area of 1.015 square kilometres (0.392 sq mi) and a density of 1,310 inhabitants per square kilometre (3,400/sq mi).

In 2011 98.9% of the residents of the parish were white and 96.8% born in the United Kingdom. Their average age was 50.9 years and their median age 56, compared to figures for City of Lancaster district of 39.21 and 38 years, and for Lancashire county of 40.5 and 41.

== Culture and community ==
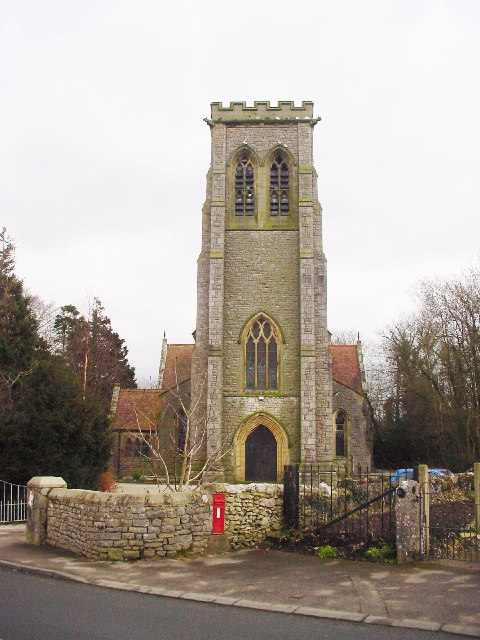
The parish church of St John

The Gaskell Memorial Hall in the centre of the village hosts a wide range of activities and events. The Silverdale Village Players perform an annual Pantomime and another production each year, and the Silverdale Handbell Ringers (founded 1906, and formally the Silverdale Church Handbell Ringers) entertain at Christmas. The village has a Women's Institute, affiliated to the "Cumbria-Westmorland" Federation of Women's Institutes although Silverdale was not in Westmorland.

The Silverdale Village Institute is a registered charity and provides a building and playing field for public use. In 2013 its committee rejected a proposal for a skatepark on the field. The well-attended 2014 AGM saw a silent demonstration by the village's children in support of a skate park, and a major change in committee membership.

The annual Silverdale and Arnside Art and Craft Trail, when local and visiting artists display their works in many venues in the two villages, takes place each summer.

In February 2012 The Royal Hotel, a public house in a prominent location in the centre of Silverdale, became the subject of a dispute when its new owner announced his intention to use the pub and its gardens as the basis for a residential development. Local opposition led to the original submission being withdrawn. Revised plans were subsequently approved by Lancaster City Council's planning committee and in April 2016 a refurbished Royal Hotel opened its doors to trade once again.

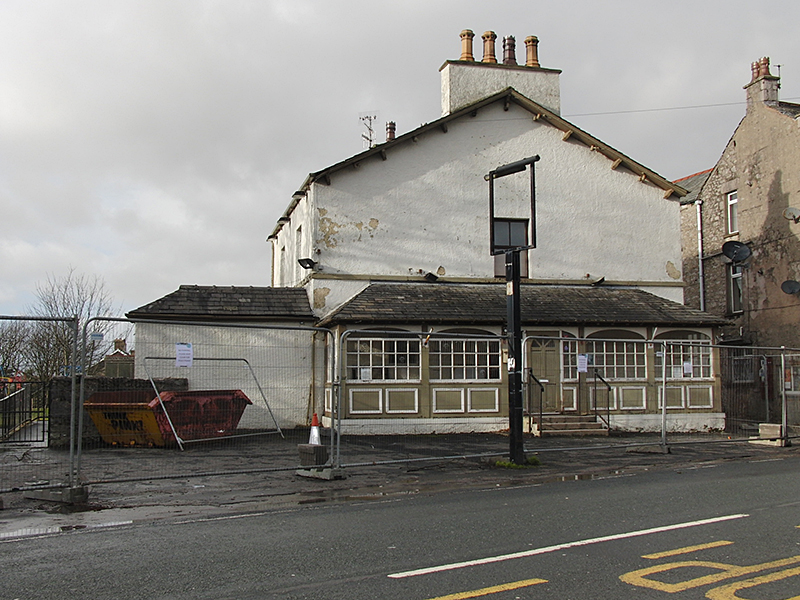
The Royal Hotel pictured in January 2014

== Transport ==
The village is served by nearby Silverdale railway station on the line from Lancaster to Barrow in Furness. The station is 1.3 mi (2.1 km) from the centre of the village by road.

As of March 2026 the village is served by the 51 bus service run by Stagecoach in Lancaster, Monday to Saturday, which takes a circular route through the village from the railway station to Holgates caravan park at uneven intervals and extends to Carnforth several times a day, and the 552, a single daily service (Mon-Sat) to Kendal run by Lonsdale Buses.

== Education ==
Silverdale Primary School (full name "Silverdale St John's Church of England Voluntary Aided Primary School") is housed in a Victorian building with more recent extensions, and has around 80 pupils. It was graded "Good" in its 2024 Ofsted report. There is no secondary school in the village.

Bleasdale School, formerly Bleasdale House School, is a day special school for pupils with profound and multiple learning difficulties, with 20 pupils aged 2–19. It was graded "Outstanding" in its 2024 Ofsted school inspection report and "Outstanding" in its 2022 Ofsted social care inspection report.

The village has a branch library open 20 hours/week. Its premises were an outbuilding of Bleasdale School, and were an electrician's shop before becoming a library in the 1960s. The library benefitted from a major refurbishment in December 2011, was closed on 29 September 2016 despite protests from the village community, and reopened on 1 November 2017.

== Religious buildings ==
St John's Church is the Anglican parish church and a Grade II* listed building, built in 1885-86. The Methodist church was also built in the 19th century. Silverdale is within the Anglican Diocese of Blackburn, the Catholic Diocese of Lancaster and the North Lancashire Methodist Circuit.

== Sport ==
The village has a bowls club and cricket team. Silverdale golf club, located near the railway station to the east of the village centre, was founded on 10 November 1906 and play started on 6 April 1907. Its original nine-hole course was extended to twelve holes in 1992 and to eighteen holes in 2002.

== Silverdale Hoard ==
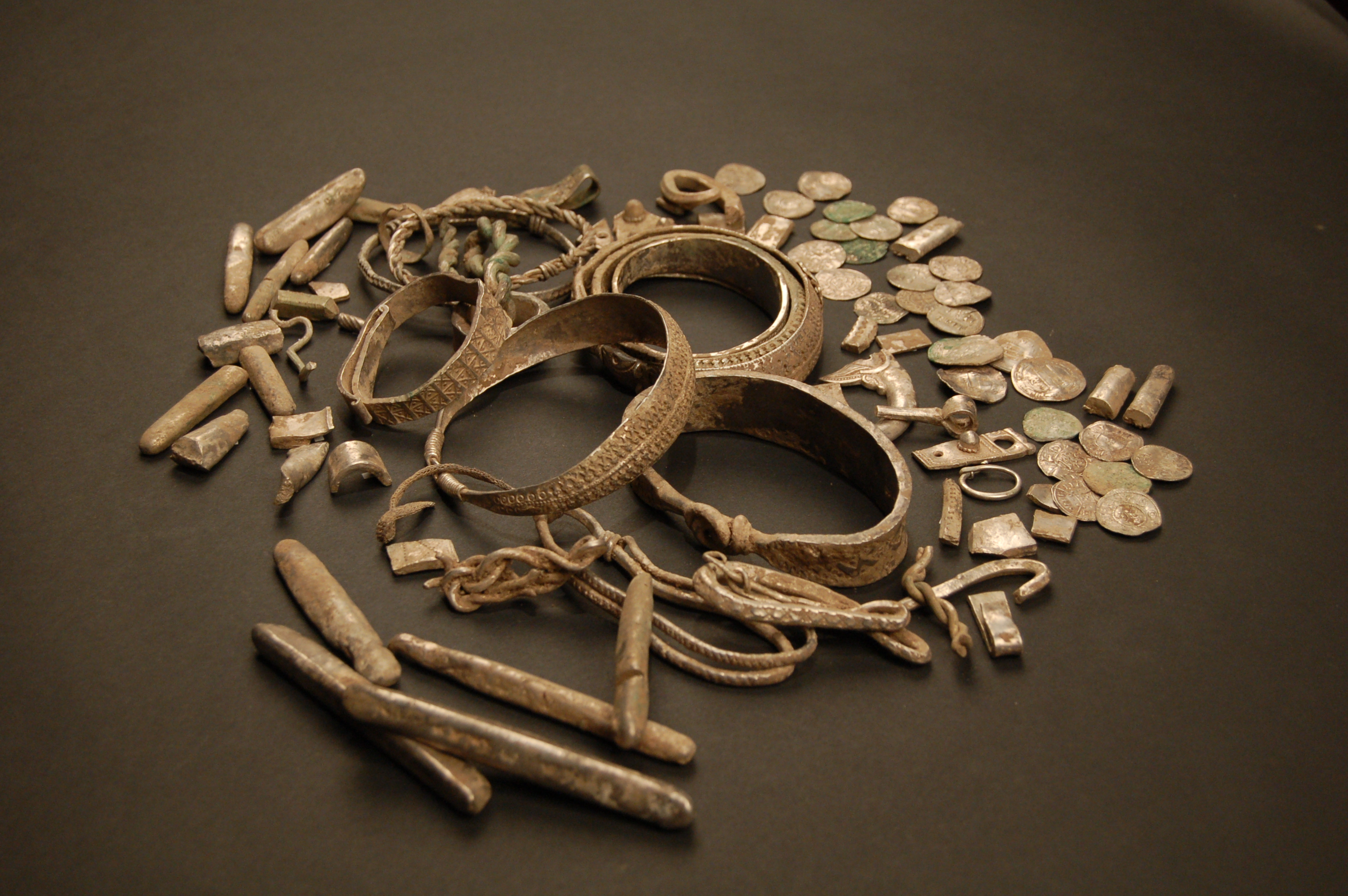
Items from the Silverdale Hoard

In September 2011, a metal detectorist unearthed the Silverdale Hoard, an early-10th-century Viking hoard comprising 201 silver coins, jewellery, ingots and hacksilver that had been buried in a lead container in the vicinity of Silverdale. The hoard was bought by Lancashire Museums Service, and was displayed in Lancaster City Museum during 2013 and the Museum of Lancashire, Preston, during 2014.

== The Matchless shipwreck ==
On 3 September 1894, the Morecambe pleasure boat Matchless capsized off Jenny Brown's Point on a trip from Morecambe to Grange-over-Sands. 25 holidaymakers from the industrial towns of Lancashire and Yorkshire drowned, the largest loss of lives in a single incident in Morecambe Bay.

== Leeds Children's Charity ==
The Leeds Children's Charity (LCC) from 1904 to 2016 provided holidays for needy children from Leeds at its Silverdale Holiday Centre, which was to the north of the village centre overlooking Morecambe Bay. (The centre was actually across the county boundary so in Far Arnside, Cumbria, though very strongly associated with Silverdale). The charity was previously named the Leeds Children's Holiday Camp Association (LCHCA), and earlier the Leeds Poor Children's Holiday Camp Association. In its last years about 275 children each year were brought for a free five-day holiday, sometimes having never left Leeds before and seeing cows in fields for the first time. During their stay, they participated in a range of outdoor and indoor activities. The Association is a registered charity, and each year's Lady Mayoress of Leeds serves as its President. Its patrons include Matthew Lewis, the Leeds-born actor best known as Neville Longbottom in the Harry Potter films. It is supported by donations from individuals and organisations in Leeds and Silverdale and elsewhere.

Frances McNeil has written a history of the Holiday Camp, Now I am a Swimmer: Silverdale Holiday Camp, the first 100 years (2004).

In late 2015 it was announced that 2016 would be the final season of children's holidays at the Silverdale centre. The site was sold to the owner of the adjacent Holgates caravan site. The Leeds Children's Charity offered children holidays instead at Lineham Farm, near Leeds, and by 2021 the charity had merged with the Lineham Farm Trust to form a new charity, Leeds Children's Charity at Lineham Farm.

== 2025-2026 earthquakes ==
An earthquake of magnitude 3.2 (earlier reported as 3.4) at a depth of 3 km (1.9 mi) at 23:23 on 3 December 2025 had its epicentre just off the coast of Silverdale. It was reported by local residents as "so powerful it shook the whole house" and feeling "like someone driving into house" but no damage to people or property was recorded. It was followed by a quake of magnitude 0.8, 1 hour 31 minutes later at 00:54 on 4 December; a quake of magnitude 0.4 at 02:04 on 5 December; a quake of magnitude 2.4, 16 days after the first quake, at 05:03 on 19 December 2025; and one of magnitude 0.7 at 11:16 on 29 December, 26 days after the initial quake. In 2026 there were several further small quakes, including ones of magnitude 2.3 on 13 May and 2.2 on 6 June. On 21 September 2026 there was the largest quake since the initial one of 3 December: magnitude 2.7, depth 3km, with the epicentre shown as near Whinney Fold, off Shore Road.

As of 13 September 2026, the British Geological Survey (BGS) had listed at least 20 earthquakes with location "Silverdale, Lancashire", beginning with that of 3 December 2025, and a BGS spokesman on 21 September 2026 said that there had been "28 recorded tremors" in the area since December but "Most of them had been too small to feel." A BGS seismologist stated the sequence were aftershocks of the larger December 2025 earthquake, and that aftershock sequences sometimes can last for years before returning to normal seismic levels.

Silverdale earthquakes 2025-2026 recorded by the British Geological Survey
| Date | Time (GMT) | Magnitude | Depth (km) | Note |
|---|---|---|---|---|
| 2025-12-03 | 23:23 | 3.2 | 3 | |
| 2025-12-04 | 00:54 | 0.8 | 3 | |
| 2025-12-05 | 02:06 | 0.4 | 3 | |
| 2025-12-19 | 05:03 | 2.4 | 3 | |
| 2025-12-29 | 11:16 | 0.7 | 3 | |
| 2026-01-13 | 04:38 | 0.7 | 3 | |
| 2026-02-03 | 23:09 | 1.1 | 3 | |
| 2026-02-10 | 02:10 | 1.2 | 4 | |
| 2026-02-22 | 10:25 | 1.4 | 3 | |
| 2026-02-28 | 13:58 | 0.5 | 3 | |
| 2026-02-28 | 16:41 | 0.5 | 3 | |
| 2026-02-28 | 18:32 | 0.6 | 3 | |
| 2026-03-02 | 21:10 | 1.1 | 4 | |
| 2026-05-13 | 09:11 | 2.3 | 3 | |
| 2026-06-06 | 21:35 | 2.2 | 3 | |
| 2026-06-07 | 17:13 | 1.1 | 3 | |
| 2026-06-07 | 19:31 | 1.1 | 3 | |
| 2026-06-15 | 21:11 | 0.5 | 3 | |
| 2026-06-22 | 19:31 | 0.7 | 3 | |
| 2026-07-08 | 05:45 | 0.5 | 1 | |
| 2026-09-13 | 03:25 | 0.9 | 3 | |
| 2026-09-21 | 08:38 | 2.7 | 3 | |

== Notable residents ==
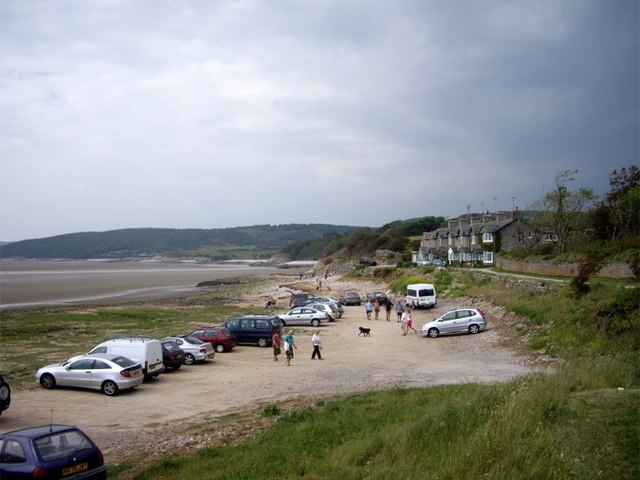
The shore, looking north

- The duo Aquilo, who played on the BBC Introducing stage at Glastonbury Festival 2014, grew up in the village.
- Kyril Bonfiglioli (1928–1985), an art dealer, magazine editor and comic novelist (author of the Mortdecai novels) lived in Silverdale in the 1960s and featured his home "Yewbarrow" in his books.
- The English poet Gordon Bottomley (1874–1948) lived in Silverdale, and his visitors there included the artist Paul Nash.
- The composer Edward Cowie (born 1943) lived in Silverdale in the 1970s.
- The Victorian novelist Elizabeth Gaskell (1810–1865) regularly holidayed in Silverdale and is said to have written some of her works in Lindeth Tower in the village; the Gaskell Memorial Hall in the centre of the village is named after her.
- The Yorkshire-born English novelist Willie Riley (1866–1961) moved to Silverdale in 1919 and named his house (no 8, Wallings Lane) Windyridge, the title of his first novel.
- Comedian Victoria Wood (1953–2016) was formerly a resident of Silverdale.
- Actress Emma Atkins (born 1975), known for her role as Charity Dingle in the ITV soap opera Emmerdale, grew up in Silverdale.

== Silverdale in popular culture ==
- The 2006 novel Sixpence in her Shoe by Frances McNeil is set partly in Silverdale in the 1920s, with particular reference to the Leeds Children's Holiday Camp.
- In October 2013, the BBC Two television natural history series Autumnwatch was broadcast over four nights from Leighton Moss RSPB reserve at Silverdale.
- A model of the village, including the "Pepperpot" (Queen Victoria Jubilee monument) and the village centre, features in Aquilo's 2021 video "Out in LA"; the Gaskell Memorial Hall is lifted away and replaced by the "101 Diner".

== See also ==
- Listed buildings in Silverdale, Lancashire
- Hazelwood Hall
