= The Yealands =

Civil parish in Lancashire, England

Coordinates: 54.17°N 2.76°W

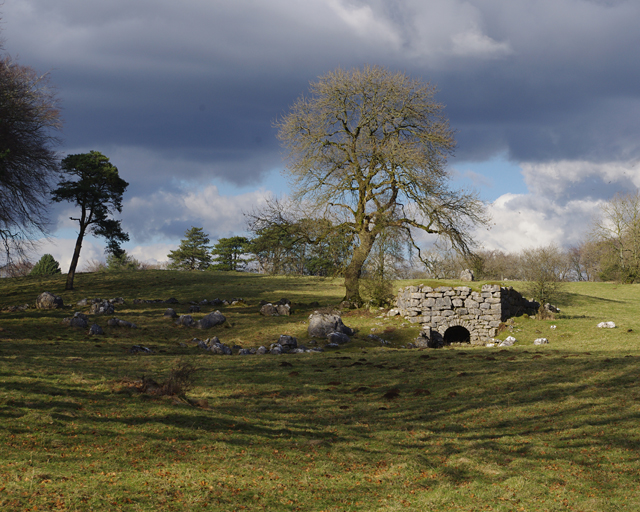
- Landscape with Lime kiln, Yealand Conyers

- Location in the City of Lancaster district Location within Lancashire
- Population: 539 (2021 census)
- Civil parish: The Yealands
- District: Lancaster
- Shire county: Lancashire
- Region: North West
- Country: England
- Sovereign state: United Kingdom

The Yealands is a civil parish in City of Lancaster district, Lancashire, England. It includes the villages of Yealand Conyers and Yealand Redmayne and the hamlet of Yealand Storrs. The parish was formed on 1 April 2024 by combining the former parishes of Yealand Conyers and Yealand Redmayne. It has a parish council, the lowest level of local government in England. In 2021 the parishes had a population of 539.

The parish is in the north west of Lancashire, with its northern boundary along the county boundary with Westmorland and Furness in Cumbria. The M6 motorway runs along the eastern border of the parish, the A6 road and the West Coast Main Line railway run through the eastern part of the parish, and the Furness line crosses the far western corner of the parish.

Most of the parish (except the area east of the A6) is within the Arnside and Silverdale National Landscape (formerly AONB).

The amenities in the parish include Yealand Church of England Primary School, Yealand Village Hall, St John's Church (Anglican), St Mary's Church (Roman Catholic), Yealand Quaker Meeting House, and the New Inn pub. Leighton Hall, Trowbarrow Quarry and most of Leighton Moss RSPB reserve are also within the parish. There are 44 listed buildings in The Yealands.
