= Yealands =

Yealand or Yealands may refer to:

- The Yealands, a civil parish in Lancashire, England
- Yealand Redmayne, a village in Lancashire, England
- Yealand Storrs, a hamlet in Lancashire, England
- Yealand Conyers, a village in Lancashire, England
- Yealands Estate, a winery in New Zealand
