= Edward Hawarden =

Edward Hawarden (aka Harden; 9 April 1662 – 23 April 1735) was an English Roman Catholic theologian and controversialist.

== Life ==
Hawarden was born in Lancashire, England. His family were recusants who maintained domestic chapels in their residences in Appleton in Widnes. Edward, after a course at the English College, Douai, remained there as a classical tutor, and after his ordination (7 June 1686), as professor of philosophy.

In 1688, having taken the bachelor's degree at the University of Douai, he spent two months as tutor of divinity at Magdalen College, Oxford, which James II of England purposed making a seat of Catholic education. The impending revolution against James forced Hawarden to return to Douai, where he soon proceeded D.D. and was installed in the chair of divinity. One of his students was the historian Hugh Tootell.

In 1702 he was persuaded to take part in the concurrence for one of the royal chair of divinity in the university, but the influence of a hostile minority secured the installation of another candidate by mandatory letters from the court. Shortly afterwards complaints were lodged at Rome that the Douai professors, Hawarden in particular, were propagating the errors of Jansenism. Hawarden was dismissed from the university, but a subsequent official investigation completely exonerated all.

In 1707 Hawarden left Douai to take charge of the mission of Gilligate, Durham, and later Aldcliffe Hall, near Lancaster. Brief entries in the Tyldesley Diary give an idea of his daily life until the seizure of Aldcliffe Hall in 1717, after which he moved to London, probably on his appointment as Controversy-writer.

Hawarden received the thanks of the University of Oxford for his defence of the Trinity in the famous conference with Samuel Clarke (1719). He died, aged 73, in London.

== Works ==
Among his works are:

- "The True Church of Christ, shewed by Concurrent Testimonies of Scripture and Primitive Tradition" (London, 1714)
- "The Rule of Faith truly stated in a new and easy Method" (London, 1721)
- "Charity and Truth or Catholicks not uncharitable in saying that none are saved out of the Catholick Communion, because the Rule is not Universal" (Brussels, 1728)
- "An Answer to Dr. Clarke and Mr. Whiston concerning the Divinity of the Son, and of the Holy Spirit" (London, 1729)

A collective edition of his works was published at Dublin in 1808.
