= Stodday =

Coordinates: 54.021°N 2.815°W

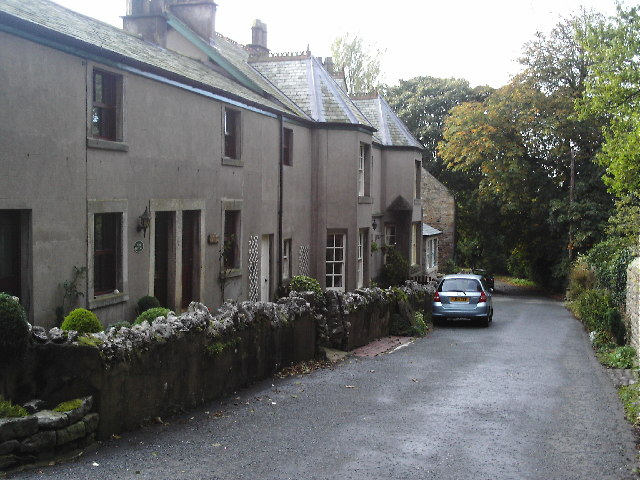
- Stodday

- Location in the City of Lancaster district Location within Lancashire
- OS grid reference: SD466586
- Civil parish: Aldcliffe-with-Stodday
- District: Lancaster
- Shire county: Lancashire
- Region: North West
- Country: England
- Sovereign state: United Kingdom
- Post town: LANCASTER
- Postcode district: LA2
- Dialling code: 01524
- Police: Lancashire
- Fire: Lancashire
- Ambulance: North West
- UK Parliament: Lancaster and Wyre

Stodday is a hamlet in the civil parish of Aldcliffe-with-Stodday, in the Lancaster district, in the county of Lancashire, England. It is just south of the city of Lancaster, near the A588 road and the River Lune.

A mile to the south, Ashton Hall is a mansion dating to 1856, now used as the clubhouse of Lancaster Golf Club, incorporating the remains of a 14th-century tower.

It was formerly in the township and civil parish of Ashton with Stodday in Lancaster Rural District, until this was incorporated into the civil parish of Lancaster in 1935.
