= 1987 Lancaster City Council election =

Election

- 7 May 1983

All 60 seats to Lancaster City Council 31 seats needed for a majority

	First party	Second party	Third party
Party	Conservative	Labour	Liberal
Last election	37 seats	15 seats	6 seats
Seats won	28	21	9
Seat change	▼9	▲6	▲3
Popular vote	39,975	37,877	23,292
	Fourth party
Party	Independent
Last election	1 seat
Seats won	2
Seat change	▲1
Popular vote	6,868
Leader before election
Conservative
Leader after election
Conservative
No overall control

The 1987 Lancaster City Council election took place on 7 May 1987. This was on the same day as other local elections in England. The election resulted in no overall control of the council.

== Election result ==
1987 Lancaster City Council
Party	Candidates	Seats	Gains	Losses	Net gain/loss	Seats %	Votes %	Votes	+/−
Conservative		28	1	10	▼9			39,975	
Labour		21	7	1	▲6			37,877	
Liberal		9	7	4	▲3			23,292	
Independent		2	2	1	▲1			6,868	

== Ward Results ==
=== Alexandra ===
Alexandra (3 seats)
Party	Candidate	Votes	%	±%
Labour	T. Masheder	904	47.7	
Conservative	R. Cunningham	763	40.2	
Labour	D. Beckingham	719		
Labour	S. Hurst	701		
Conservative	B. Pearson	676		
Conservative	K. Warren	620		
Liberal	R. Birch	230	12.1	
Liberal	S. Priestnall	206		
Liberal	M. Mellor Ms.	206		
Turnout		4,025	44.8	
Labour hold				
Conservative hold				
Labour gain from Conservative				

=== Arkholme ===
Arkholme (1 seat)
Party	Candidate	Votes	%	±%
Conservative	V. Fidler Ms.	553	80.3	
Liberal	M. Hartley Ms.	136	19.7	
Turnout		689	55.1	
Conservative hold				

=== Bolton-Le-Sands ===
Bolton-Le-Sands (2 seats)
Party	Candidate	Votes	%	±%
Conservative	A. Briggs	1,168	60.6	
Conservative	G. Parkes	986		
Liberal	P. Mellor	526	27.3	
Liberal	J. Kirkman Ms.	385		
Labour	B. Swarbrick Ms.	233	12.1	
Turnout		3,298	53.1	
Conservative hold				
Conservative hold				

=== Bulk ===
Bulk (3 seats)
Party	Candidate	Votes	%	±%
Labour	A. Bryning	1,483	57.3	
Labour	J. Yates Ms.	1,425		
Labour	I. Barker	1,407		
Liberal	A. Gee	467	18.0	
Conservative	D. Cowherd	435	16.8	
Liberal	C. Hellawell	402		
Independent	M. Varey	205	7.9	
Turnout		5,824	46.3	
Labour hold				
Labour hold				
Labour hold				

=== Carnforth ===
Carnforth (2 seats)
Party	Candidate	Votes	%	±%
Conservative	E. Watson	817	45.6	
Labour	E. Jones Ms.	798	44.6	
Labour	E. Jackson Ms.	681		
Conservative	C. Oswald	556		
Liberal	W. Greenwell	176	9.8	
Liberal	C. Pollitt	164		
Turnout		3,192	43.7	
Conservative hold				
Labour hold				

=== Castle ===
Castle (3 seats)
Party	Candidate	Votes	%	±%
Labour	J. Sutton	1,451	47.1	
Labour	S. Henig	1,428		
Labour	P. Rye	1,402		
Liberal	A. Chester Ms.	871	28.3	
Liberal	J. Cope Ms.	844		
Conservative	C. Macmillan	760	24.7	
Liberal	A. Shortland Ms.	678		
Turnout		7,434	54.4	
Labour hold				
Labour hold				
Labour hold				

=== Caton ===
Caton (2 seats)
Party	Candidate	Votes	%	±%
Liberal	S. Mews	1,205	61.1	
Liberal	P. Quinton Ms.	830		
Conservative	P. Swaczyn Ms.	630	31.9	
Labour	K. Hodges	138	7.0	
Labour	R. Poole	123		
Turnout		2,926	56.9	
Liberal hold				
Liberal hold				

=== Ellel ===
Ellel (2 seats)
Party	Candidate	Votes	%	±%
Conservative	R. Carr	1,063	61.9	
Conservative	L. Sixsmith	912		
Labour	D. Glaister Ms.	351	20.5	
Liberal	H. Tedcastle Ms.	302	17.6	
Turnout		2,628	46.9	
Conservative hold				
Conservative hold				

=== Halton-With-Aughton ===
Halton-With-Aughton (1 seat)
Party	Candidate	Votes	%	±%
Conservative	H. Towers	490	44.9	
Liberal	A. Kay Ms.	259	23.7	
Independent	P. Woodruff	250	22.9	
Labour	K. Harrison	93	8.5	
Turnout		1,092	57.6	
Conservative hold				

=== Harbour ===
Harbour (2 seats)
Party	Candidate	Votes	%	±%
Conservative	D. Jackson	991	45.6	
Labour	D. Stanley	805	37.0	
Conservative	D. Cox	740		
Labour	M. Smith Ms.	692		
Independent	T. Bown	378	17.4	
Independent	P. Turner	356		
Turnout		3,962	53.8	
Conservative hold				
Labour gain from Independent				

=== Heysham Central ===
Heysham Central (2 seats)
Party	Candidate	Votes	%	±%
Independent	J. Taylor Ms.	1,017	50.6	
Conservative	B. Ford Ms.	703	35.0	
Conservative	K. Brook	601		
Independent	M. Woodhouse Ms.	395		
Labour	J. Mackenzie	288	14.3	
Turnout		3,004	54.9	
Independent gain from Residents				
Conservative hold				

=== Heysham North ===
Heysham North (2 seats)
Party	Candidate	Votes	%	±%
Liberal	M. Clarke Ms.	678	44.0	
Liberal	R. Clarke	599		
Conservative	R. Pettigrew	450	29.2	
Conservative	N. Morley	445		
Labour	A. Robertson	412	26.8	
Turnout		2,584	45.9	
Liberal gain from Conservative				
Liberal gain from Conservative				

=== Heysham South ===
Heysham South (3 seats)
Party	Candidate	Votes	%	±%
Independent	M. Turner	1,152	31.1	
Conservative	J. Rawnsley	997	27.0	
Conservative	F. Weller	926		
Labour	J. Johnstone	897	24.2	
Labour	D. Slater	889		
Conservative	N. Pym	879		
Labour	S. McCubbin Ms.	778		
Liberal	R. Jopson	653	17.7	
Liberal	M. Pangbourne	487		
Turnout		6,658	52.9	
Independent gain from Conservative				
Conservative hold				
Conservative hold				

=== Hornby ===
Hornby (1 seat)
Party	Candidate	Votes	%	±%
Conservative	G. Hannah	Unopposed		
Turnout		0	0.0	
Conservative hold				

=== John O'Gaunt ===
John O'Gaunt (3 seats)
Party	Candidate	Votes	%	±%
Labour	P. Kavanagh	1,126	40.4	
Labour	M. Blamire Ms.	1,084		
Labour	J. Fearnley	1,045		
Conservative	W. Thompson Ms.	787	28.2	
Conservative	K. Huntington Ms.	786		
Conservative	W. Webster	768		
Liberal	L. Boyle Ms.	748	26.8	
Liberal	H. Davies	735		
Liberal	P. Phizackerley	653		
Green	F. Stevenson Ms.	126	4.5	
Green	D. Harrison	96		
Green	P. Jones	91		
Turnout		6,955	51.4	
Labour gain from Liberal				
Labour gain from Liberal				
Labour gain from Liberal				

=== Kellet ===
Kellet (1 seat)
Party	Candidate	Votes	%	±%
Conservative	H. Shuttleworth Ms.	566	66.7	
Liberal	H. Crawshaw	146	17.2	
Labour	J. Pratt	136	16.0	
Turnout		848	55.8	
Conservative hold				

=== Overton ===
Overton (1 seat)
Party	Candidate	Votes	%	±%
Conservative	W. Mashiter	549	61.5	
Labour	D. Beesley	206	23.1	
Liberal	P. Kerwin	137	15.4	
Turnout		892	48.0	
Conservative hold				

=== Parks ===
Parks (2 seats)
Party	Candidate	Votes	%	±%
Conservative	J. Race Ms.	1,031	59.3	
Conservative	P. Lewis	982		
Independent	T. Hughes	529	30.4	
Independent	M. Billam	451		
Labour	A. Smith Ms.	179	10.3	
Labour	J. Richmond	162		
Turnout		3,334	50.4	
Conservative hold				
Conservative hold				

=== Poulton ===
Poulton (3 seats)
Party	Candidate	Votes	%	±%
Conservative	S. Burns Ms.	882	43.5	
Conservative	J. Unsworth	789		
Conservative	W. Thornton	732		
Independent	P. Heath Ms.	611	30.2	
Labour	D. Ashley	533	26.3	
Independent	N. Midgley	521		
Labour	A. Kay	495		
Independent	L. Pickford Ms.	491		
Labour	T. Tattersall	484		
Turnout		5,538	44.6	
Conservative hold				
Conservative hold				
Conservative hold				

=== Scotforth East ===
Scotforth East (3 seats)
Party	Candidate	Votes	%	±%
Liberal	J. Gilbert	1,293	40.3	
Liberal	E. Huddleston Ms.	1,129		
Liberal	J. Salter	1,077		
Conservative	F. Allison	959	29.9	
Labour	P. Elliott	955	29.8	
Labour	C. Rogers	918		
Conservative	R. Kenyon	910		
Labour	W. Glaister	889		
Conservative	J. Pacula	873		
Turnout		8,003	54.5	
Liberal gain from Conservative				
Liberal gain from Conservative				
Liberal gain from Labour				

=== Scotforth West ===
Scotforth West (3 seats)
Party	Candidate	Votes	%	±%
Conservative	E. Simpson	910	41.8	
Conservative	D. Sykes	900		
Conservative	J. Ball	896		
Labour	A. Biddulph	750	34.4	
Labour	B. Carre Ms.	736		
Labour	M. Wright	709		
Liberal	R. Taylor	519	23.8	
Liberal	P. Smith	453		
Liberal	D. Towers	434		
Turnout		5,507	48.2	
Conservative hold				
Conservative hold				
Conservative hold				

=== Silverdale ===
Silverdale (1 seat)
Party	Candidate	Votes	%	±%
Conservative	M. Butterworth Ms.	502	51.7	
Liberal	J. Greenwell Ms.	469	48.3	
Turnout		971	51.4	
Conservative hold				

=== Skerton Central ===
Skerton Central (2 seats)
Party	Candidate	Votes	%	±%
Labour	D. Henderson Ms.	1,107	70.9	
Labour	J. Horner Ms.	1,000		
Liberal	J. Acres	455	29.1	
Turnout		2,562	45.9	
Labour hold				
Labour hold				

=== Skerton East ===
Skerton East (2 seats)
Party	Candidate	Votes	%	±%
Labour	J. Lodge	743	51.8	
Labour	L. Orriss	724		
Liberal	I. Acres Ms.	377	26.3	
Conservative	J. Calvert	314	21.9	
Liberal	C. Livesley Ms.	312		
Turnout		2,470	46.2	
Labour hold				
Labour hold				

=== Skerton West ===
Skerton West (2 seats)
Party	Candidate	Votes	%	±%
Conservative	J. Taylor Ms.	989	50.1	
Labour	T. Dawson	985	49.9	
Labour	N. Penney Ms.	954		
Conservative	J. Stephenson	887		
Turnout		3,815	52.6	
Conservative hold				
Labour gain from Conservative				

=== Slyne-With-Hest ===
Slyne-With-Hest (2 seats)
Party	Candidate	Votes	%	±%
Conservative	S. Rostron Ms.	980	65.4	
Conservative	F. Wilcox	876		
Liberal	M. Jackson	400	26.7	
Liberal	L. Saville Ms.	393		
Labour	M. Swarbrick	119	7.9	
Turnout		2,768	54.7	
Conservative hold				
Conservative hold				

=== Torrisholme ===
Torrisholme (2 seats)
Party	Candidate	Votes	%	±%
Liberal	B. Deighton	1,160	50.1	
Liberal	A. Saville	1,031		
Conservative	P. Whitworth	981	42.4	
Conservative	J. Downey	975		
Labour	I. Waterhouse	174	7.5	
Labour	T. Penney	168		
Turnout		4,489	62.4	
Liberal gain from Conservative				
Liberal gain from Conservative				

=== Victoria ===
Victoria (3 seats)
Party	Candidate	Votes	%	±%
Labour	M. Barr	1,118	39.1	
Labour	S. Booth	1,085		
Labour	K. Dixon	1,072		
Conservative	P. Fell Ms.	889	31.1	
Conservative	T. Shingler	879		
Conservative	J. Howlett	787		
Independent	K. Wilson	502	17.6	
Liberal	E. Hills Ms.	349	12.2	
Liberal	B. Jephcott	306		
Turnout		6,987	50.3	
Labour gain from Conservative				
Labour hold				
Labour hold				

=== Warton ===
Warton (1 seat)
Party	Candidate	Votes	%	±%
Conservative	D. Wood	435	44.8	
Liberal	C. Peacock	412	42.5	
Labour	C. Robinson	123	12.7	
Turnout		970	50.6	
Conservative gain from Liberal				
