= Bulk =

Bulk can refer to:

== Industry ==
- Bulk cargo
- Bulk carrier
- Bulk liquids
- Bulk mail
- Bulk material handling
- Bulk pack, packaged bulk materials/products
- Bulk purchasing
- Paper bulk

== Food and pharmacy ==
- Filler (materials), also known as bulking agent, a major ingredient of a food product or pharmaceutical tablet to change its properties.
- Bulk fermentation, the period after mixing when dough is left alone to ferment in bulk, meaning before division to final weights.

== Physics ==
- Bulk density
- Bulk modulus
- In brane cosmology and M-theory (see also the AdS/CFT correspondence), the bulk is a hypothetical higher-dimensional space within which the eleven dimensions of our universe (the three dimensions we can see, plus time, plus the seven extra dimensions that we can't see but M-theory theorizes are all around us) may exist.

== People ==
- Mike Waters, known as Bulk, British professional wrestler with the UK Pitbulls
- The Bulk, the main character of The Amazing Bulk

== Fiction ==
- Bulk and Skull, a pair of characters in the Power Rangers universe
- Bulk (film), an upcoming film by Ben Wheatley

== Places ==
- Bulk, Lancashire, area of Lancaster, England
- Bülk Lighthouse, outside Kiel, Germany
