= Lancaster Rural District =

Extinct rural district in Lancashire, England

Coordinates: 53.0°N 2.8°W

Lancaster Rural District was a rural district in the county of Lancashire, England. It was created in 1894 and abolished in 1974 under the Local Government Act 1972.

It was made up of 22 civil parishes to the north and south of the city of Lancaster.

It had a population of 8,837 in 1901 and 14,018 in 1961.

== Parishes ==
The parishes included in the rural district for at least some of its history included:

- Aldcliffe (to 1935)
- Ashton with Stodday
- Bolton-le-Sands
- Bulk (to 1900)
- Cockerham
- Cockersand Abbey (to 1930)
- Ellel
- Heaton-with-Oxcliffe
- Heysham (1894-1899)
- Middleton
- Overton
- Over Wyresdale
- Priest Hutton
- Scotforth
- Silverdale
- Skerton (1894-1900)
- Slyne-with-Hest
- Thurnham
- Warton (1935-1974)
- Warton with Lindeth
- Yealand Conyers
- Yealand Redmayne
