= Heaton, Lancashire =

Heaton, Lancashire may refer to:

- Heaton, Lancaster, in Heaton-with-Oxcliffe parish
- Heaton, Greater Manchester, near Bolton, Greater Manchester
- Four Heatons, near Stockport, Greater Manchester
