= Leighton Hall =

Leighton Hall may refer to:

- Leighton Hall, Lancashire
- Leighton Hall, Powys
- Leighton Hall, Shropshire
