= Ashton with Stodday =

Coordinates: 54.01°N 2.82°W

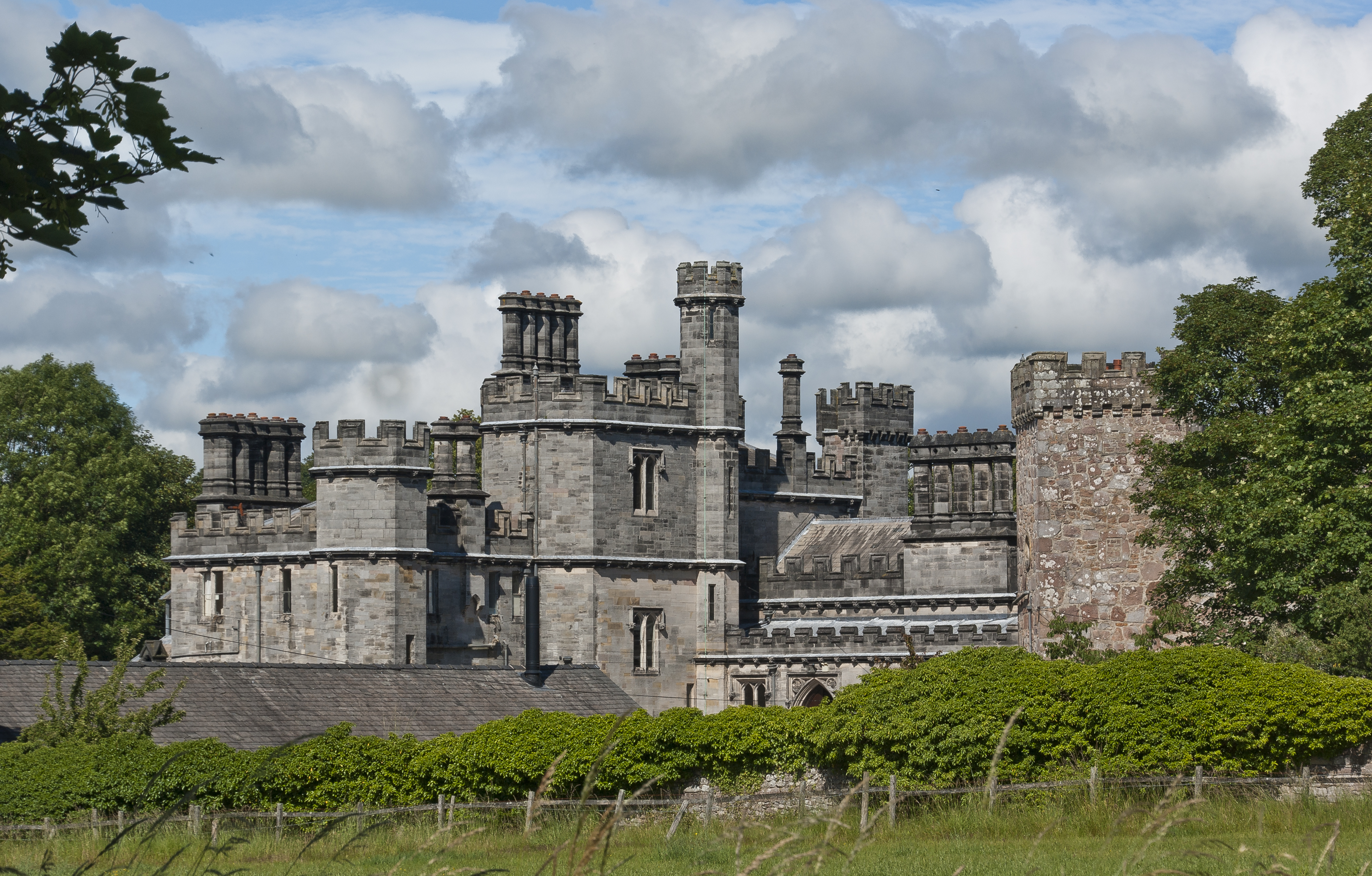
- Ashton Hall

- Location in the City of Lancaster district Location within Lancashire
- Civil parish: Thurnham
- District: Lancaster
- Shire county: Lancashire
- Region: North West
- Country: England
- Sovereign state: United Kingdom

Ashton with Stodday is a former township and civil parish, now in the parish of Thurnham, in the Lancaster district, in Lancashire, England.

Ashton-with-Stodday was formerly a township in the parish of Lancaster. The civil parish was created in 1866 and became part of Lancaster Rural District in 1894. The hamlet of Stodday was transferred to Lancaster civil parish and borough in 1935. The parish was abolished and incorporated into Thurnham on 1 April 1980. The population was recorded as 191 in 1871, 173 in 1931, 87 in 1961 and 109 in 1971. The parish was bordered on the north by the parish of Aldcliffe, on the west by the River Lune and on the south by the River Conder, and included the hamlets of Stodday and Conder Green and the estate of Ashton Hall.
