= Listed buildings in The Yealands =

The Yealands is a civil parish in Lancaster, Lancashire, England. It was created in 2024 from the parishes of Yealand Conyers and Yealand Redmayne. It contains 44 buildings that are recorded in the National Heritage List for England as designated listed buildings. Of these, three are at Grade II*, the middle grade, and the others are at Grade II, the lowest grade. The civil parish contains the villages of Yealand Conyers and Yealand Redmayne, and is otherwise rural. Most of the listed buildings are houses, farmhouses and farm buildings, many of them on the main streets of the villages. The other listed buildings include a country house, two churches, and a Quaker Meeting House. The Lancaster Canal passes through the parish, and three bridges crossing it are listed, together with a milestone on its towpath.

== Key ==
Grade	Criteria
II*	Particularly important buildings of more than special interest
II	Buildings of national importance and special interest

== Buildings ==
Name and location	Photograph	Date	Notes	Grade
Barn opposite Eight Acre Lane; 54.17593°N 2.76569°W	—	17th century	The barn originated as a house. It is in limestone with sandstone dressings and a slate roof, and is in two storeys. The building contains a wide entrance and mullioned windows. To the left is a later lean-to extension. (Note: Street View in June 2009 shows that it has been converted back into residential use.)	II
Storrs Farmhouse; 54.17229°N 2.76411°W	—	1666	A stone house with a slate roof, in two storeys with an attic. At the west end is a gabled extension to the north. The windows are mullioned, and there is a stair window to the left of the front door.	II
Old Hall Farmhouse; 54.16739°N 2.76103°W		1667	A limestone house with a slate roof in two storeys with attics. The original windows are mullioned, and there is one sash window. On the front is a central porch, and at the rear is a later wing.	II
Old Post House; 54.16474°N 2.76133°W	—	Late 17th century	A limestone house with a slate roof, once divided into two dwellings, and later back into one. It has two storeys and an attic. The original part has mullioned windows and two central doorways. To the right is an extension with an outshut containing casement windows, and further to the right is another extension.	II
The Castle; 54.17310°N 2.76472°W	—	Late 17th century	A limestone house with sandstone dressings and a slate roof, in two storeys with attics. In the centre is a three-storey gabled porch flanked by bays with gabled dormers. The windows are mullioned, and there is a continuous drip course above the ground floor openings.	II*
Hill Top Farmhouse; 54.17365°N 2.76484°W	—	Late 17th century	The farmhouse is in limestone with sandstone dressings and a slate roof. There are later extensions at the rear. Most of the windows are mullioned. Inside the house is a bressumer.	II
Yew Tree Cottage and Yew Tree House; 54.17348°N 2.76481°W	—	Late 17th century	A pair of pebbledashed houses with a slate roof, in two storeys with attics. Some of the windows are sashes and others are modern. No. 23 has a porch roofed by two sandstone flags, a doorway with chamfered jambs, and a 17th-century door. The attic contains a gabled dormer containing a four-light mullioned window. No. 21. to the left, has a wooden porch.	II
Quaker Meeting House; 54.16344°N 2.76153°W		1692	The meeting house is in roughcast stone with a slate roof, and has one storey. On the front is a gabled porch and sash windows. The doorway has a chamfered surround and a dated segmental head. Inside the building is a gallery.	II*
Leighton Furnace Barn; 54.19350°N 2.79126°W	—	1718	The barn is in limestone with a slate roof. Its west wall contains blocked doorways, and in the east wall are various openings, including doors, windows, and a wide entrance with a segmental arch. In the south gable end is a pitching hole.	II
3 and 5 Silverdale Road; 54.17261°N 2.76433°W	—	1719	Originally one house, later divided into two cottages, in pebbledashed stone with a slate roof and in two storeys. No. 5 has sash windows and a fire window, The windows in No, 3, to the left, are modern.	II
Green Garth; 54.16223°N 2.76219°W	—	Mid 18th century (probable)	The house contains some 17th-century material. It is in limestone with sandstone dressings and a slate roof, and has three storeys and four bays. The windows are mullioned, and on the front is a bay window. The doorway has a chamfered surround.	II
Leighton Hall; 54.16300°N 2.77580°W		1759–60	The country house was designed by John Hird in Georgian style, and its front was Gothicized in 1822–25. Extensions were added in 1870 by Paley and Austin. The house is in limestone with sandstone dressings and a slate roof. The main block has two storeys and three bays, it has a battlemented parapet, octagonal corner turrets, and a single-story battlemented porch. To the right is a single-storey link to a pavilion and a conservatory. To the left is a two-storey link to a battlemented tower with a four-storey turret. To the rear of the tower is a three-storey wing.	II*
The Bower; 54.16082°N 2.76239°W	—	Late 18th century	The house is in stone with a slate roof, it has two storeys and sash windows. The original part has three bays, and there is a single-bay extension to the south. The doorway has a plain surround, and there is an iron porch. There are further extensions to the rear.	II
Dykes Farmhouse; 54.16544°N 2.75567°W	—	Late 18th century	A pebbledashed stone house with a slate roof, in two storeys and two bays. The openings have plain surrounds, and the windows are sashes.	II
Laurel Bank; 54.16254°N 2.76230°W	—	Late 18th century	The house is in stone with sandstone dressings, a slate roof, and a rendered left gable end. There are two storeys with an attic, and a symmetrical three-bay front. The windows are sashes, and the central gabled porch has decorated bargeboards. On the left side is a canted bay window and a conservatory.	II
2 and 3 Storrs Grange; 54.17231°N 2.76386°W	—	Late 18th century (probable)	A limestone barn with some sandstone dressings. On the west front is a wide entrance with a segmental arch, a gabled extension to the left, and a lean-to extension to the right. There are various openings, including windows, doors and ventilation slits. (Note: Street View in June 2009 shows that the barn has been converted for domestic use.)	II
Browfoot Farmhouse; 54.17645°N 2.77756°W	—	Late 18th century (possible)	A stone house with a slate roof, incorporating 17th-century material. It has two storeys and four bays. The doorway has a moulded surround, a four-centred head, and a lintel inscribed with initials and the date.	II
Barn, Hilderstone; 54.18326°N 2.73920°W	—	Late 18th century (probable)	The building originated as a mill. It is in limestone and cobble and has a slate roof. There are two storeys with an attic, and two gables facing the road. It is on a sloping site and at the rear is a first floor wide entrance with a slated canopy. There are various openings on the other faces, some of which have been blocked or altered. (Note: Street View in August 2010 shows that the barn has been converted for domestic use.)	II
Kilross Lodge; 54.16751°N 2.76022°W	—	c. 1800	This originated as a limestone barn with a slate roof. In the south front are various openings, one of which is wide with a segmental arch. On the right gable end is a lean-to extension, and on top of the gables are ball finials. Set into the south wall is a sandstone milestone with a rounded top. (Note: Street View dated June 2009 shows that the barn has been converted for residential use.)	II
Yealand Manor; 54.16492°N 2.76484°W	—	1805	A country house in limestone with a hipped slate roof, in two storeys with attics. The east front has three bays and contains a portico with two pairs of baseless unfluted Doric columns and an entablature. The north and south fronts have five bays. All the windows are sashes, some with mullions, and there is a gabled attic dormer.	II
Beechfield; 54.16185°N 2.76083°W	—	c. 1810	The house is in limestone with a hipped slate roof, and has two storeys with an attic and three bays. The windows are sashes, and there is a gabled attic dormer. On the front is a portico with pilasters and Tuscan columns, a frieze, and a cornice. To the left is a two-bay 19th-century extension.	II
Saltermire Bridge (No 141); 54.16899°N 2.73690°W		1819	The bridge carries Cinderbarrow Lane over the Lancaster Canal. It is in limestone, and consists of a single semi-elliptical arch with a projecting keystone. It has a solid parapet with flat-topped coping.	II
Yealand Road Bridge, (No.142); 54.17612°N 2.74203°W		1819	The bridge carries Tarn Lane over the Lancaster Canal. It is in limestone and consists of a single semi-elliptical arch with a projecting keystone.. The bridge has a solid parapet with a flat top.	II
Moss Bridge, (No.143); 54.18221°N 2.73844°W		1819	An accommodation bridge over the Lancaster Canal. It is in limestone and consists of a single semi-elliptical arch with chamfered voussoirs and a projecting keystone.	II
Milestone; 54.17972°N 2.74103°W	—	1819	The milestone is on the towpath of the Lancaster Canal. It is in sandstone and has a rectangular plan with a rounded top. On the faces are sunken ovals containing numbers.	II
5, 7 and 9 Yealand Road; 54.16095°N 2.76140°W	—	Early 19th century	A row of three limestone cottages with a slate roof in two storeys. Most of the windows are sashes, and the doorways have plain surrounds.	II
6 Yealand Road; 54.16149°N 2.76143°W	—	Early 19th century	The house is in limestone with sandstone dressings and a slate roof in two storeys.. It consists of a main block with three bays and a cross-wing to the right. The windows are sashes, and the doorway has a plain surround and a cornice hood on brackets.	II
Holmere Bank; 54.16567°N 2.75409°W	—	Early 19th century	A limestone house with a slate roof in two storeys with an attic. It has a three-bay front with a single-bay extension to the left. The house has chamfered quoins, a parapet, and sash windows. The doorway has a plain surround and a moulded cornice hood. In the extension is a canted bay window.	II
New Inn; 54.16692°N 2.76093°W		Early 19th century	The public house incorporates material from the 17th century. It is in pebbledashed stone with a slate roof, and has two storeys with an attic and three bays. Most of the windows are sashes, and the central doorway has a cornice hood. In the rear wall is a mullioned window, and there is a rear wing with external steps leading to a first floor doorway.	II
Peterhill House; 54.16265°N 2.76229°W	—	Early 19th century	The house is pebbledashed with a slate roof, and has two storeys with attics, and three bays. In the ground floor are a French window, a doorway with a plain surround and a fanlight containing intersecting tracery, and a canted bay window. Most of the windows are sashes. To the right is a lower two-storey wing, and at the rear is a lean-to extension and a gabled wing.	II
Stable block, Yealand Manor; 54.16479°N 2.76555°W	—	Early 19th century	The former stables are in limestone with sandstone dressings and a hipped slate roof. There are two storeys. In the east wall are two wide entrances with segmental arches, one of which is blocked, doors, and windows. In the west wall are pitching holes.	II
Cinderbarrow Farmhouse; 54.17375°N 2.74465°W	—	Early 19th century	The house is pebbledashed with a hipped slate roof. There are two storeys, and a symmetrical three-bay front with a Tuscan porch. The windows are sashes.	II
Hilderstone and Cottages; 54.18342°N 2.73949°W	—	Early 19th century	A pebbledashed house with two cottages to the north. They have sandstone dressings and slate roofs, and are in two storeys with sash windows. The house has three bays, the southern cottage has two bays, and the northern cottage has three. The house has a doorway with a cornice hood, and the south wall is partly slate-hung containing a stair window with a semicircular head.	II
53 Yealand Road; 54.16695°N 2.76123°W	—	Early to mid 19th century	A stone house with a slate roof, in two storeys with an attic and with two bays. The openings have plain surrounds, the windows being sashes. On the front is a wooden porch with fretwork and a finial.	II
The Elms and stable block 54.16090°N 2.76091°W	—	Early to mid 19th century	The house and stable block are in limestone with slate roofs, and they contain sash windows. The house has two storeys and a west front of three bays. The entrance is in a north two-bay extension, and there is also a lean-to extension to the east. A wall links the house to a stable and coach house that contain a blocked wide entrance with a segmental arch and a pitching hole.	II
Yealand House; 54.16104°N 2.76317°W	—	Early to mid 19th century	A pebbledashed house with a limestone porch, a slate roof, and sash windows. It has 2 !/2 storeys, and main front of six bays, the outer two bays on each side projecting under gables. In the central two bays is a porch that has octagonal piers with capitals and bases. The east wall has four bays, and there are extensions at the rear.	II
St John's Church; 54.16682°N 2.75654°W		1836	The north aisle was added in 1861, and the chancel in 1882. The church is in limestone, with sandstone dressings in the chancel, and it has a slate roof. It consists of a nave, a north aisle, a chancel, and a west tower with a projecting battlemented parapet. Most of the windows are lancets.	II
10 Yealand Road; 54.16201°N 2.76184°W	—	Mid 19th century	A pebbledashed stone house with a slate roof, in two storeys and three bays. In the centre is a gabled porch with a modern door. The windows are modern in plain limestone surrounds.	II
Langdale; 54.16767°N 2.75656°W	—	1851	Originally a vicarage, the house is in limestone with a hipped slate roof and sash windows. The east front has four bays, the central two bays projecting forward under a gable. The north front has three bays, and contains a single-storey porch and a doorway with a chamfered surround and a cornice hood. On the west side a s low gabled wing.	II
St Mary's Church; 54.16054°N 2.76139°W		1852	A Roman Catholic church by E. G. Paley in limestone with a slate roof. It consists of a nave, a lower chancel, and a north porch. At the west end is a double gabled bellcote. The windows are lancets with plate tracery.	II
Wall and railings, 4 Yealand Road; 54.16089°N 2.76110°W	—	Uncertain	The low concave wall is in limestone, and it has iron railings with urn finials. There is a pair of square limestone gate piers with pointed caps.	II
Old Hall Cottage; 54.16725°N 2.76119°W	—	Uncertain	Originally a barn, later converted into a house with a garage, it is in stone with a slate roof and has modern windows. In the south wall is a gabled porch, and in the east wall is a wide entrance with a pointed arched head. There are ball finials on the gables.	II
Mounting block, Quaker Meeting House; 54.16346°N 2.76173°W	—	Uncertain	The mounting block is in limestone, and consists of a central platform flanked by three steps.	II
Yealand War Memorial; 54.170°N 2.7622°W		1920	Stone latin cross, rising from a base on a plinth in a cobbled area, at the boundary of the former parishes, commemorating six men and one woman who died in World War I and two men who died in World War II	II

== Notes and references ==
Notes

Citations

Sources

- Hartwell, Clare; Pevsner, Nikolaus (2009) [1969], Lancashire: North, The Buildings of England, New Haven and London: Yale University Press, ISBN 978-0-300-12667-9
- Historic England, "Old Hall Farmhouse, Yealand Conyers (1071843)", National Heritage List for England
- Historic England, "Old Post House, Yealand Conyers (1308672)", National Heritage List for England
- Historic England, "Quaker Meeting House, Yealand Conyers (1308669)", National Heritage List for England
- Historic England, "Green Garth, Yealand Conyers (1362463)", National Heritage List for England
- Historic England, "Leighton Hall, Yealand Conyers (1071836)", National Heritage List for England
- Historic England, "The Bower, Yealand Conyers (1071840)", National Heritage List for England
- Historic England, "Dykes Farmhouse, Yealand Conyers (1146839)", National Heritage List for England
- Historic England, "Laurel Bank, Yealand Conyers (1308726)", National Heritage List for England
- Historic England, "Kilross Lodge, Yealand Conyers (1146864)", National Heritage List for England
- Historic England, "Yealand Manor, Yealand Conyers (1146968)", National Heritage List for England
- Historic England, "Beechfield, Yealand Conyers (1308687)", National Heritage List for England
- Historic England, "Saltermire Bridge (No 141), Yealand Conyers (1146808)", National Heritage List for England
- Historic England, "Nos. 5, 7 and 9 Yealand Road, Yealand Conyers (1146929)", National Heritage List for England
- Historic England, "No. 6 Yealand Road, Yealand Conyers (1362465)", National Heritage List for England
- Historic England, "Holmere Bank, Yealand Conyers (1071837)", National Heritage List for England
- Historic England, "The New Inn, Yealand Conyers (1146880)", National Heritage List for England
- Historic England, "Peterhill House, Yealand Conyers (1071841)", National Heritage List for England
- Historic England, "Stable block to Yealand Manor, Yealand Conyers (1071842)", National Heritage List for England
- Historic England, "No. 53 Yealand Road, Yealand Conyers (1308743)", National Heritage List for England
- Historic England, "The Elms and stable block attached to the south-west, Yealand Conyers (1071802)", National Heritage List for England
- Historic England, "Yealand House, Yealand Conyers (1071839)", National Heritage List for England
- Historic England, "Church of St. John, Yealand Conyers (1071835)", National Heritage List for England
- Historic England, "No. 10 Yealand Road, Yealand Conyers (1071844)", National Heritage List for England
- Historic England, "Langdale, Yealand Conyers (1071838)", National Heritage List for England
- Historic England, "Church of St Mary, Yealand Conyers (1147015)", National Heritage List for England
- Historic England, "Wall and Railings with Gates in front of No. 4 Yealand Road, Yealand Conyers (1147104)", National Heritage List for England
- Historic England, "Old Hall Cottage, Yealand Conyers (1362464)", National Heritage List for England
- Historic England, "Mounting block on roadside to west of Quaker Meeting House, Yealand Conyers (1071801)", National Heritage List for England
- Historic England, "Barn adjoining to the north of No.45 Silverdale Road opposite the junction with Eight Acre Lane, Yealand Redmayne (1362488)", National Heritage List for England
- Historic England, "Storrs Farmhouse, Yealand Redmayne (1147199)", National Heritage List for England
- Historic England, "The Castle, Yealand Redmayne (1308587)", National Heritage List for England
- Historic England, "Hill Top Farmhouse, Yealand Redmayne (1147258)", National Heritage List for England
- Historic England, "Yew Tree Cottage and Yew Tree House, Yealand Redmayne (1071806)", National Heritage List for England
- Historic England, "Leighton Furnace Barn, Yealand Redmayne (1147108)", National Heritage List for England
- Historic England, "Nos. 3 and 5 Silverdale Road, Yealand Redmayne (1362487)", National Heritage List for England
- Historic England, "2 and 3, Storrs Grange, Yealand Redmayne (1071805)", National Heritage List for England
- Historic England, "Browfoot Farmhouse, Yealand Redmayne (1147266)", National Heritage List for England
- Historic England, "Barn south-east of Hilderstone, on opposite side of road, Yealand Redmayne (1071804)", National Heritage List for England
- Historic England, "Yealand Road Bridge, (No.142), Yealand Redmayne (1071807)", National Heritage List for England
- Historic England, "Moss Bridge, (No.143), Yealand Redmayne (1071803)", National Heritage List for England
- Historic England, "Milestone on western bank of canal, 300 metres south of Moss Bridge at NGR SD 517 762, Yealand Redmayne (1362485)", National Heritage List for England
- Historic England, "Cinderbarrow Farmhouse, Yealand Redmayne (1362486)", National Heritage List for England
- Historic England, "Hilderstone and Cottages adjoining to north, Yealand Redmayne (1308639)", National Heritage List for England
- Historic England, "Yealand War Memorial (1427706)", National Heritage List for England
- Historic England, Listed Buildings
