= Listed buildings in Heaton-with-Oxcliffe =

Heaton-with-Oxcliffe is a civil parish in Lancaster, Lancashire, England. It contains three listed buildings that are recorded in the National Heritage List for England, all of which are listed at Grade II. This grade is the lowest of the three gradings given to listed buildings and is applied to "buildings of national importance and special interest". The parish is almost entirely rural and the listed buildings consist of a house, a farmhouse and a public house.

== Buildings ==
Name and location	Photograph	Date	Notes
Oxcliffe Hall Farmhouse; 54.05047°N 2.84175°W	—	1644	The house was altered in 1697. It is in rendered stone with a modern tiled roof. The house is in an L-plan, with two storeys and attics. The main front has three bays. In the centre is a moulded doorcase with an inscribed lintel. The windows are either modern or sashes.
Golden Ball Inn; 54.04711°N 2.84316°W		Early 18th century	A pebbledashed stone public house with a slate roof. It has two storeys, and the main part is in two bays. It has a central moulded doorway with a mullioned window to the left. On the right of the main part is a lower wing with a French window flanked by modern windows. The other windows are sashes.
Old Wood House; 54.03677°N 2.85093°W	—	Mid 18th century	A sandstone house with a slate roof, in two storeys and three bays. The central doorway has chamfered jambs and a plain lintel. The windows are mullioned.
