= 1976 Lancaster City Council election =

Election

- 6 May 1976

All 60 seats to Lancaster City Council 31 seats needed for a majority

	First party	Second party	Third party
Party	Conservative	Labour	Independent
Last election	34 seats	17 seats	4 seats
Seats won	43	11	5
Seat change	▲9	▼6	▲1
Popular vote	40,619	26,745	9,325
	Fourth party
Party	Liberal
Last election	1 seat
Seats won	1
Popular vote	3,202
Leader before election
Conservative
Leader after election
Conservative

Composition of Lancaster City Council after the 1976 election

The 1976 Lancaster City Council election took place on 6 May 1976. This was on the same day as other local elections in England.

== Summary ==
The election resulted in a Conservative majority hold.

=== Election result ===
1976 Lancaster City Council
Party	Candidates	Seats	Gains	Losses	Net gain/loss	Seats %	Votes %	Votes	+/−
Conservative		43	9		▲9			37,811	
Labour		11		6	▼6			26,745	
Independent		5	1		▲1			9,325	
Liberal		1						3,202	

== Ward Results ==
=== Arkholme ===
Arkholme (1 seat)
Party	Candidate	Votes	%	±%
Conservative	H. Wigley	531	75.0	
Independent	E. Leake Ms.	177	25.0	
Turnout		708	57.5	
Conservative hold				

=== Bolton-Le-Sands ===
Bolton-Le-Sands (2 seats)
Party	Candidate	Votes	%	±%
Conservative	W. Rigg	1,118	70.8	
Conservative	A. Briggs	1,002		
Liberal	R. Skelly	461	29.2	
Liberal	H. Brown	342		
Turnout		2,923	50.6	
Conservative hold				
Conservative hold				

=== Carnforth ===
Carnforth (2 seats)
Party	Candidate	Votes	%	±%
Labour	E. Jones Ms.	665	43.3	
Labour	J. Clarke	646		
Independent	J. Wilson Ms.	492	32.1	
Independent	G. Owen	467		
Conservative	M. Newsham Ms.	378	24.6	
Conservative	R. Bowden	371		
Turnout		3,019	45.4	
Labour hold				
Labour hold				

=== Halton-With-Aughton ===
Halton-With-Aughton (1 seat)
Party	Candidate	Votes	%	±%
Conservative	H. Towers	717	74.9	
Labour	J. Scott	240	25.1	
Turnout		957	50.9	
Conservative gain from Independent				

=== Heysham North ===
Heysham North (2 seats)
Party	Candidate	Votes	%	±%
Conservative	M. Kennan	903	55.0	
Conservative	G. Bryan	823		
Labour	M. Turley	509	31.0	
Labour	B. Wolfenden	504		
Independent	M. Mawson Ms.	229	14.0	
Turnout		2,968	45.4	
Conservative hold				
Conservative hold				

=== Hornby ===
Hornby (1 seat)
Party	Candidate	Votes	%	±%
Conservative	F. Pearson	491	55.1	
Independent	D. Goth	281	31.5	
Labour	J. Oyston	119	13.4	
Turnout		891	67.4	
Conservative hold				

=== Harbour ===
Harbour (2 seats)
Party	Candidate	Votes	%	±%
Conservative	K. Brook	973	55.5	
Conservative	D. Sykes	924		
Labour	E. Garbutt	780	44.5	
Labour	G. Wolfenden	720		
Turnout		3,397	47.2	
Conservative gain from Labour				
Conservative gain from Labour				

=== Poulton ===
Poulton (2 seats)
Party	Candidate	Votes	%	±%
Conservative	G. Heeler	613	39.5	
Independent	W. Earnshaw	520	33.5	
Independent	A. Haworth	517		
Labour	L. Holmes	418	27.0	
Conservative	N. Pym	407		
Turnout		2,475	40.9	
Conservative gain from Labour				
Independent gain from Labour				

=== Parks ===
Parks (2 seats)
Party	Candidate	Votes	%	±%
Conservative	J. Dawson	Unopposed		
Conservative	I. Welldrake Ms.	Unopposed		
Turnout		0	0.0	
Conservative hold				
Conservative hold				

=== Heysham Central ===
Heysham Central (3 seats)
Party	Candidate	Votes	%	±%
Independent	J. Taylor Ms.	1,052	52.9	
Conservative	K. Wilson	938	47.1	
Conservative	T. Higginson	903		
Conservative	R. Fearn Ms.	762		
Turnout		3,655	45.3	
Independent gain from Conservative				
Conservative hold				
Conservative hold				

=== Heysham South ===
Heysham South (3 seats)
Party	Candidate	Votes	%	±%
Independent	N. Bolton Ms.	1,147	40.3	
Conservative	J. Downey	860	30.2	
Labour	S. Taylor	836	29.4	
Conservative	K. Warren	753		
Independent	E. Johnson Ms.	687		
Turnout		4,283	50.4	
Independent gain from Residents				
Conservative hold				
Labour gain from Residents				

=== Cockerham ===
Cockerham (1 seat)
Party	Candidate	Votes	%	±%
Conservative	R. Bibby	Unopposed		
Turnout		0	0.0	
Conservative hold				

=== Ellel ===
Ellel (2 seats)
Party	Candidate	Votes	%	±%
Independent	R. Carr	806	39.5	
Conservative	J. Lowthion	655	32.1	
Labour	W. Stafford	372	18.2	
Conservative	J. Cook	217		
Liberal	M. Brown	206	10.1	
Turnout		2,256	52.9	
Independent hold				
Conservative hold				

=== Warton ===
Warton (1 seat)
Party	Candidate	Votes	%	±%
Liberal	C. Peacock	639	63.1	
Conservative	H. Shuttleworth Ms.	374	36.9	
Turnout		1,013	52.2	
Liberal hold				
Conservative hold				

=== Caton ===
Caton (2 seats)
Party	Candidate	Votes	%	±%
Conservative	M. Potts Ms.	982	71.6	
Conservative	G. Walling	912		
Labour	C. Adams	390	28.4	
Labour	T. Myall	315		
Turnout		2,599	51.8	
Conservative hold				
Conservative hold				

=== Kellet ===
Kellet (1 seat)
Party	Candidate	Votes	%	±%
Conservative	G. Snowball	407	69.0	
Independent	P. Comish	183	31.0	
Turnout		590	46.6	
Conservative hold				

=== Bulk & St. Annes ===
Bulk & St. Annes (4 seats)
Party	Candidate	Votes	%	±%
Labour	A. Bryning	1,273	66.8	
Labour	M. Lewthwaite	1,237		
Labour	J. Yates Ms.	1,209		
Labour	J. O'Donnell	1,177		
Conservative	E. Stokes	634	33.2	
Conservative	T. Hope	624		
Turnout		6,154	26.3	
Labour hold				
Labour hold				
Labour hold				
Labour hold				

=== Park ===
Park (2 seats)
Party	Candidate	Votes	%	±%
Conservative	D. Leswer	784	56.0	
Conservative	H. Osliffe	721		
Labour	I. Brown Ms.	617	44.0	
Labour	J. Brown	609		
Turnout		2,731	43.9	
Conservative gain from Labour				
Conservative gain from Labour				

=== John O'Gaunt ===
John O'Gaunt (3 seats)
Party	Candidate	Votes	%	±%
Conservative	M. Lovett-Horn Ms.	1,225	61.8	
Conservative	T. Hayton	1,179		
Conservative	H. Holgate	1,172		
Labour	M. Glover Ms.	757	38.2	
Labour	L. Shaw	726		
Labour	R. Van De Weyer	721		
Turnout		5,780	45.1	
Conservative hold				
Conservative hold				
Conservative hold				

=== Scotforth ===
Scotforth (4 seats)
Party	Candidate	Votes	%	±%
Conservative	J. Ball	1,686	47.3	
Conservative	E. Simpson	1,639		
Conservative	K. Nelson	1,630		
Conservative	J. Outram	1,550		
Labour	S. Bennett Ms.	1,042	29.2	
Labour	B. Freeman	1,020		
Labour	L. Mullett Ms.	1,011		
Labour	J. Baker	1,009		
Liberal	M. Mumford	836	23.5	
Liberal	P. Walker	718		
Turnout		10,141	40.6	
Conservative hold				
Conservative hold				
Conservative hold				
Conservative hold				

=== Castle ===
Castle (2 seats)
Party	Candidate	Votes	%	±%
Conservative	W. Sweeney Ms.	987	51.5	
Labour	D. Brewer	834	43.6	
Conservative	D. Rawes	810		
Labour	A. Burnett Ms.	765		
Communist	K. Wilcock	94	4.9	
Turnout		3,490	48.3	
Conservative hold				
Labour gain from Conservative				

=== Alexandra ===
Alexandra (2 seats)
Party	Candidate	Votes	%	±%
Conservative	D. Kershaw	774	43.1	
Conservative	H. Hargreaves	745		
Independent	E. Simpson Ms.	532	29.7	
Labour	A. Garbutt Ms.	488	27.2	
Labour	M. Harper Ms.	390		
Turnout		2,929	47.5	
Conservative hold				
Conservative hold				

=== Overton ===
Overton (1 seat)
Party	Candidate	Votes	%	±%
Conservative	W. Mashiter	Unopposed		
Turnout		0	0.0	
Conservative gain from Independent				

=== Silverdale ===
Silverdale (1 seat)
Party	Candidate	Votes	%	±%
Conservative	A. Whitaker	Unopposed		
Turnout		0	0.0	
Conservative hold				

=== Skerton Central ===
Skerton Central (2 seats)
Party	Candidate	Votes	%	±%
Labour	D. Henderson Ms.	1,054	70.4	
Labour	J. Horner Ms.	933		
Conservative	B. Nelson	443	29.6	
Turnout		2,430	40.3	
Labour hold				
Labour hold				

=== Skerton East ===
Skerton East (2 seats)
Party	Candidate	Votes	%	±%
Conservative	J. Richardson	613	50.7	
Labour	R. Jones	596	49.3	
Labour	J. Lodge	582		
Turnout		1,791	40.4	
Conservative gain from Labour				
Labour hold				

=== Skerton West ===
Skerton West (2 seats)
Party	Candidate	Votes	%	±%
Conservative	J. Taylor Ms.	913	42.5	
Conservative	S. Smith	872		
Labour	P. Senior	746	34.7	
Independent	M. Varey	488	22.7	
Turnout		3,019	51.1	
Conservative hold				
Conservative hold				

=== Slyne-With-Hest ===
Slyne-With-Hest (2 seats)
Party	Candidate	Votes	%	±%
Conservative	F. Wilcox	Unopposed		
Conservative	R. Schofield	Unopposed		
Turnout		0	0.0	
Conservative hold				
Conservative hold				

=== Torrisholme ===
Torrisholme (2 seats)
Party	Candidate	Votes	%	±%
Conservative	P. Sumner	1,448	75.5	
Conservative	P. Whitworth	1,200		
Independent	W. Escolme	469	24.5	
Turnout		3,117	48.1	
Conservative hold				
Conservative hold				

=== Victoria ===
Victoria (3 seats)
Party	Candidate	Votes	%	±%
Independent	T. Langridge	1,338	43.5	
Conservative	S. King Ms.	1,012	32.9	
Conservative	T. Shingler	944		
Labour	A. Leach	723	23.5	
Labour	P. Hooper	712		
Turnout		4,729	43.6	
Independent hold				
Conservative gain from Labour				
Conservative gain from Labour				
