= St Mary's Church, Yealand Conyers =

Coordinates: 54.1605°N 2.7614°W

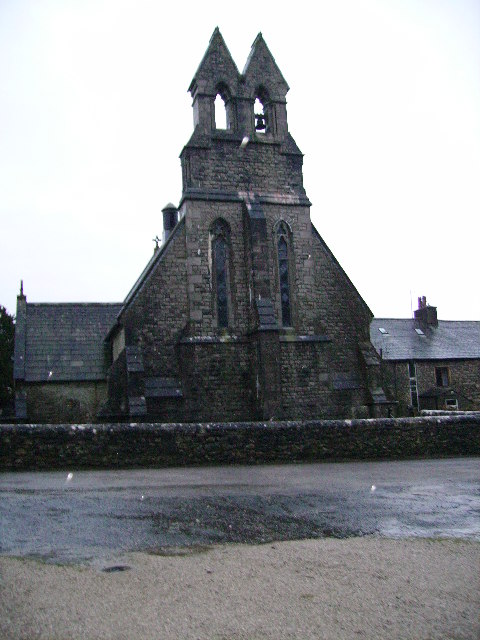
- West end of St Mary's Church, Yealand Conyers

- Location in the City of Lancaster district
- OS grid reference: SD 504,741
- Location: Yealand Conyers, Lancashire
- Country: England
- Denomination: Roman Catholic
- Website: St Mary, Yealand Conyers

History
- Founder: Richard Gillow
- Dedication: Saint Mary

Architecture
- Architect: E. G. Paley
- Architectural type: Church
- Style: Gothic Revival
- Completed: 1852

Specifications
- Materials: Limestone, slate roof

Administration
- Diocese: Lancaster

Clergy
- Priest: Canon John X. Gibson

St Mary's Church is in the village of Yealand Conyers, Lancashire, England. It is an active Roman Catholic church in the diocese of Lancaster, and is linked with the churches of St Mary of the Angels, Bolton-le-Sands, and Our Lady of Lourdes, Carnforth. The church is recorded in the National Heritage List for England as a designated Grade II listed building. It stands at the south end of the village.

== History ==
The church was built in 1852 for Richard Gillow of nearby Leighton Hall, and designed by the Lancaster architect E. G. Paley. It cost between £1,100 and £1,200. In 2009 the parish was formally linked with the Roman Catholic parishes of Carnforth and Bolton-le-Sands.

== Architecture ==
=== Exterior ===
St Mary's is constructed in limestone and has a steep slate-covered roof. Its plan consists of a five-bay nave, a chancel at a lower level, and a north porch. At the west end is a projecting bay with a central buttress. On each side of the buttress is a lancet window. The bay is surmounted by a double gabled bellcote. There are further lancet windows around the church, the east end having three stepped lancets. At the corners of the church are diagonal buttresses. Above the porch doorway is the carving of the Virgin Mary in a sandstone niche.

=== Interior ===
The nave has a scissor-braced roof, and the roof of the chancel is arch-braced. The reredos is elaborately carved. The altar is supported by marble columns, and the altar rail is in alabaster with green marble columns. The church contains a family pew for the Gillows at the northwest end, and elsewhere are box pews carved with poppyheads. Only the east window contains stained glass. Also in the church are brasses in memory of members of the Gillow family. The authors of the volume in the Buildings of England series comment that the church was intended to outdo the Anglican church in the village "in size, prominence and quality".

== See also ==
- Listed buildings in Yealand Conyers
- List of works by Sharpe and Paley
