= Mary Ann Bibby =

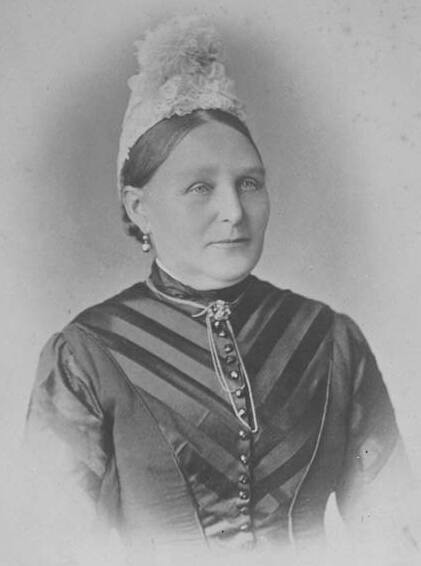
- Bibby, c. 1880s
- Born: c. 1832; Heaton, Lancashire, England
- Died: 13 January 1910
- Occupation: Storekeeper

Mary Ann Bibby (c.1832 – 13 January 1910) was a New Zealand storekeeper.

== Biography ==
She was born in Heaton, Lancashire, England. She managed a successful import firm from 1862 onward and became known as one of the first successful businesswomen of the colony.
