= Aldcliffe-with-Stodday =

Coordinates: 54.03°N 2.81°W

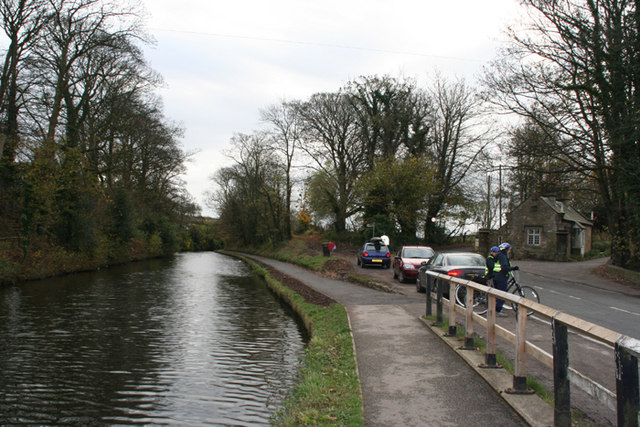

- Location in the City of Lancaster district Location within Lancashire
- Population: 509 (2018 estimate)
- Civil parish: Aldcliffe-with-Stodday
- District: Lancaster
- Shire county: Lancashire
- Region: North West
- Country: England
- Sovereign state: United Kingdom

Aldcliffe-with-Stodday or Aldcliffe with Stodday is a civil parish in City of Lancaster district, Lancashire, England. It lies to the south west of central Lancaster and east of the River Lune, and includes the hamlets of Aldcliffe and Stodday.

The parish was created in 2017 by the Lancaster City Council (Reorganisation of Community Governance) Order 2017. It has a parish council.

The parish did not exist at the time of the 2011 census, but in 2018 the parish had an estimated population of 509. As of January 2020 the National Heritage List for England does not yet recognise the parish name in its database of listed buildings.
