= St John the Evangelist's Church, Yealand Conyers =

Coordinates: 54.1668°N 2.7565°W

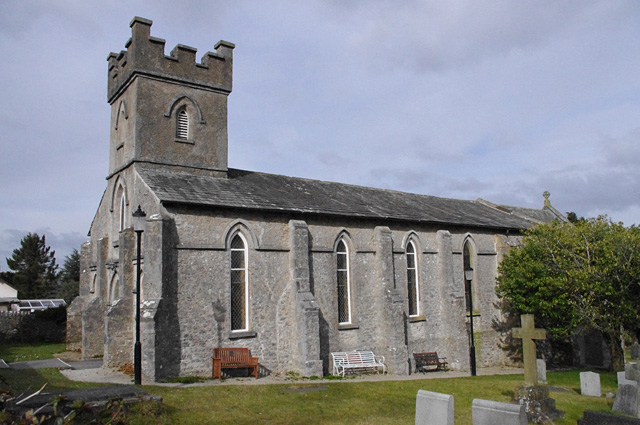
- St John's Church from the south

- Location in the City of Lancaster district
- OS grid reference: SD 507 748
- Location: Church Lane, Yealand Conyers, Lancashire
- Country: England
- Denomination: Anglican
- Website: St John, Yealand

History
- Status: Parish church
- Founded: 1838

Architecture
- Functional status: Active
- Heritage designation: Grade II
- Designated: 2 May 1968
- Architect: George Webster (attrib.)
- Architectural type: Church
- Style: Gothic Revival
- Groundbreaking: 1838
- Completed: 1882

Specifications
- Materials: Limestone and sandstone, slate roof

Administration
- Province: York
- Diocese: Blackburn
- Archdeaconry: Lancaster
- Deanery: Tunstall
- Parish: St. John Yealand Conyers

St John the Evangelist's Church is in Church Lane, Yealand Conyers, Lancashire, England. It is an active Anglican parish church in the diocese of Blackburn. The church was built in 1838, extended in 1861 and again in 1882. It is constructed mainly in limestone, and consists of a nave, a north aisle, a chancel and a west tower. Inside is a west gallery and stained glass by Shrigley and Hunt. It is recorded in the National Heritage List for England as a designated Grade II listed building.

== History ==
The church was built in 1838, and its design has been attributed to George Webster. The north aisle was added in 1861, and the chancel in 1882. It was originally a chapel of ease in the parish of St Oswald, Warton, and became a parish in its own right on 25 September 1870.

== Architecture ==
=== Exterior ===
St John's is constructed in limestone rubble with limestone dressings in the main part of the church, and sandstone dressings in the chancel. The tower is pebbledashed and the roof is slated. The plan consists of a five-bay nave, a north aisle, a chancel, and a west tower. In the tower is a west doorway with a pointed head and a hood mould. This is flanked by buttresses, lancet windows with hood moulds, and more buttresses on the corners of the tower. Above the doorway is a window with a pointed head containing Y-tracery, and at the top of the tower is a projecting battlemented parapet. Along the aisle and the south wall of the nave are lancet windows, and the chancel windows are cusped. At the east end are three buttresses, a three-light window containing intersecting tracery, and trefoils.

=== Interior ===
Inside the church the arcade has octagonal piers, and there is a west gallery. On the south side of the church is stained glass by Carl Almquist of Shrigley and Hunt dated 1889 depicting the Good Shepherd, and there are two memorial tablets by George Webster. The pipe organ was made by the Jardine Organ Company.

== Appraisal ==
St John's Church was designated as a Grade II listed building on 2 May 1968. Grade II is the lowest of the three grades of listing and is applied to buildings "of special interest, warranting every effort to preserve them". In the Buildings of England series, the architectural historians Hartwell and Pevsner describe the church as being "low and homely" but comment that the battlements are "clumsy", and the hood moulds are "lumpy".

== 21st century ==
The church is an active parish church in the deanery of Tunstall, the archdeaconry of Lancaster, and the diocese of Blackburn. Its benefice is united with those of St Oswald, Warton, and St Mary, Borwick.

== See also ==
- Listed buildings in Yealand Conyers
