= Bulk, Lancashire =

Area of Lancaster, England

Coordinates: 54.06°N 2.78°W

Bulk
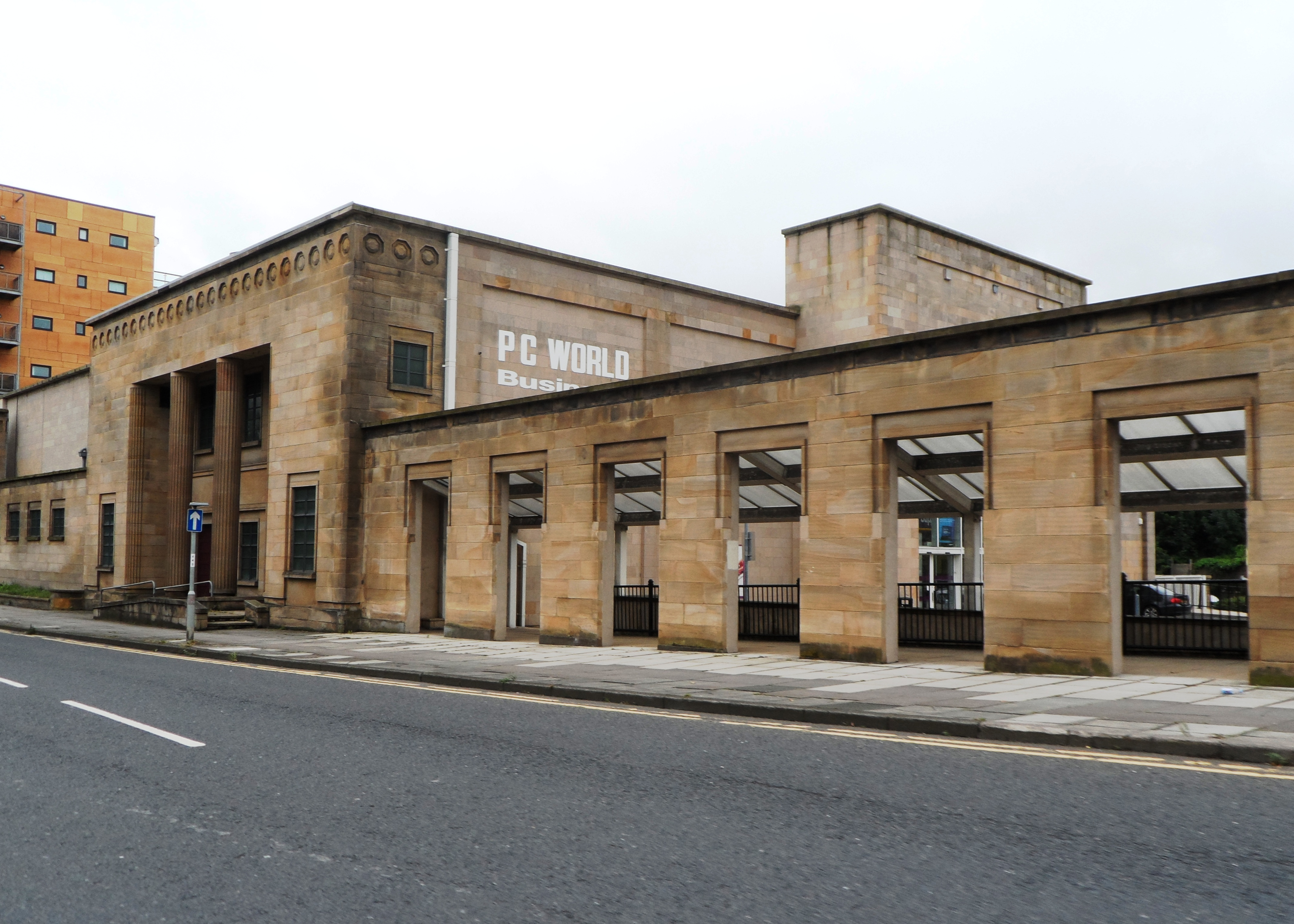
- Former Baths

- Location of suburb in Lancaster unparished area Location in the City of Lancaster district Location within Lancashire
- District: Lancaster
- Shire county: Lancashire
- Region: North West
- Country: England
- Sovereign state: United Kingdom

Bulk is an area of Lancaster, Lancashire, England. It was formerly a township and a civil parish. The placename Bulke was recorded in 1346. The manor of Neuton was recorded in this area in the Domesday Book but by 1318 Newton was described as a hamlet within Bulk.

The civil parish of Bulk was in Lancaster Rural District until 9 November 1900 when most of it (179 houses) was incorporated into the civil parish of Lancaster, with 9 houses going into the civil parish of Quernmore.

The population of the civil parish of Bulk was 116 in 1871, 117 in 1881, and 671 in 1891.

Bulk lies north of the city centre of Lancaster, and on the same side, the east, of the River Lune. The parish extended along the river to a point south of Halton on the other bank, the boundary then turning south and curving round towards Lancaster.

There was a church mission room in Bulk by 1914. The mission's World War I war memorial has been relocated to the redundant St John's Church in Lancaster, and carries the names of 33 men from Bulk district, 30 of whom survived. The 11th Lancaster Scout group was based at the mission in the 1940s.
