= Tyldesley Diary =

The Tyldesley diary was a diary kept by Thomas Tyldesley of Fox Hall, Lancashire (1657–1715), a Catholic recusant and Jacobite sympathiser, between 1712 and 1714.

== The diary ==
The diary is a valuable historical source for the light it sheds on the daily lives and routines of the Lancastrian gentry of the age and, in particular, during the period immediately before the Jacobite rising of 1715 – Lancashire being one of the heartlands of such support for the cause of the Old Pretender as still existed at that time.

== Damage to the manuscript ==
In 2007, it was discovered that the manuscript of the diary, owned by Peter J. Tyldesley, had been seriously damaged while in the custody of the British Library to which it had been entrusted for safekeeping.
