= Yealand Storrs =

Coordinates: 54.178°N 2.773°W

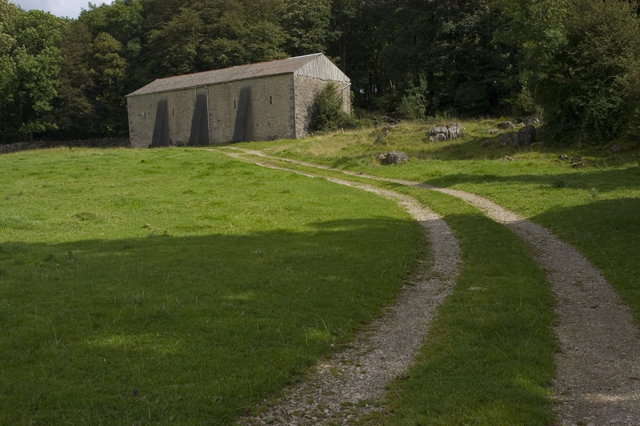
- Grisedale Farm

- Location in the City of Lancaster district Location within Lancashire
- Population: 300 (2001)
- OS grid reference: SD496761
- Civil parish: Yealand Redmayne
- District: Lancaster
- Shire county: Lancashire
- Region: North West
- Country: England
- Sovereign state: United Kingdom
- Post town: CARNFORTH
- Postcode district: LA5
- Dialling code: 01539
- Police: Lancashire
- Fire: Lancashire
- Ambulance: North West
- UK Parliament: Westmorland and Lonsdale

Yealand Storrs is a hamlet in the English county of Lancashire.

== Geography ==
Yealand Storrs is north of Lancaster near the border with Cumbria, it is in the civil parish of Yealand Redmayne, in the City of Lancaster district.

== Gallery ==
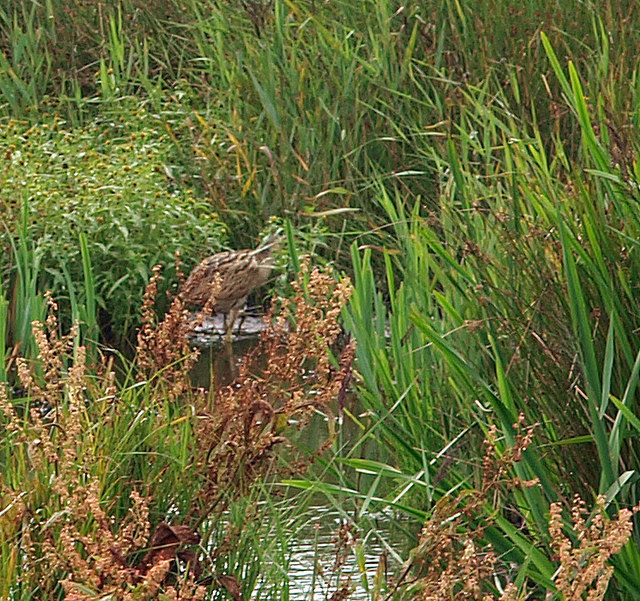
A little bittern near Yealand Storrs

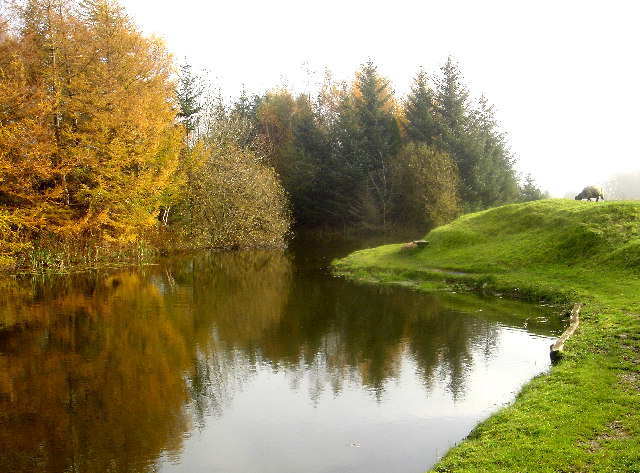
Hallmore trout farm

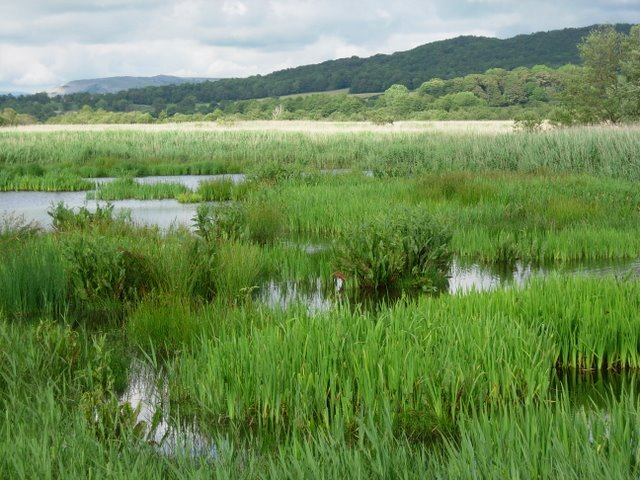
View of Leighton Moss
