= Aldcliffe Hall =

19th-century English country house

- Location within Lancaster

General information
- Status: Demolished
- Coordinates: 54.0367°N 2.8116°W
- Completed: 1817
- Demolished: 1960

Aldcliffe Hall was a 19th-century country house, now demolished, which replaced a previous mediaeval building, on the bank of the Lune estuary in Aldcliffe, Lancashire, England.

Built in a porous local stone, it was covered in stucco for protection.

== History ==
The Aldcliffe estate was acquired by the strongly Catholic Dalton family in 1557 during the reign of Queen Mary after it had been confiscated from Syon Priory by the Crown. The purchaser, Robert Dalton, High Sheriff of Lancashire for 1577, left it to his son, also Robert Dalton. The younger Dalton had ten devout daughters, many of whom lived together at Aldcliffe, causing the hall to be given the name "Hall of the Catholic Virgins." Because of their adherence to the Catholic faith, two thirds of their land was sequestered by Parliament during the English Civil War. The last two surviving sisters left the property to the clergy who had been running a teaching mission at the house. In 1716, after an enquiry, the land was confiscated by the crown due to popish activities. It was bought by Richard Leigh of Newton-in-Bowland and passed via his son Richard to the latter's son Benjamin. Benjamin left it to his daughter Isobel and her husband Robert Dawson. After Robert's death in 1769, his widow Isobel continued to live at the house for another 12 years, together with her son John, who married and had an only son, Edward Dawson (1793–1876).

In 1817, Edward built the new hall slightly uphill from the old hall, which he demolished to provide some of the building material. He also constructed an embankment to reclaim 160 acres of marshland. By 1827 he had improved the house by adding a drive, a lodge and a tree lined carriageway and landscaped the surrounding countryside with spinneys and a tree plantation. He died in 1876 and the estate passed to his son Edward Bousfield Dawson. Edward Bousfield extended the house by adding a castellated wing, installed electricity and also allowed the Glasson Dock Branch railway line to cross the estate. In 1904 he was made Constable of Lancaster Castle. His two sons died before maturity and so the property was divided, the land going to his grandson and the hall going to his daughter, Mary Philadelphia, who lived with him until his death in 1916 and then in her own right until her death in 1945. The hall and its surrounding gardens passed to her nephew Eric Edward Hall, a mining engineer, who assumed by deed poll the surname of Dawson-Hall.

In 1946, the contents of the hall were sold and it became a hostel for displaced foreign workers in 1950. In 1953, Eric Dawson-Hall sold the property (the hall and gardens, Home Farm, West Lodge and Ivy Cottage, some 40 acres in all) to Mrs. Muriel Townley, wife of Barton Townley, of Bailrigg. The hall was now disused with the gardens overgrown and was finally demolished in 1960. The land has since been developed for housing.

The East Lodge, now a house, is a grade II listed building.
