= Yealand Redmayne =

Coordinates: 54.175°N 2.765°W

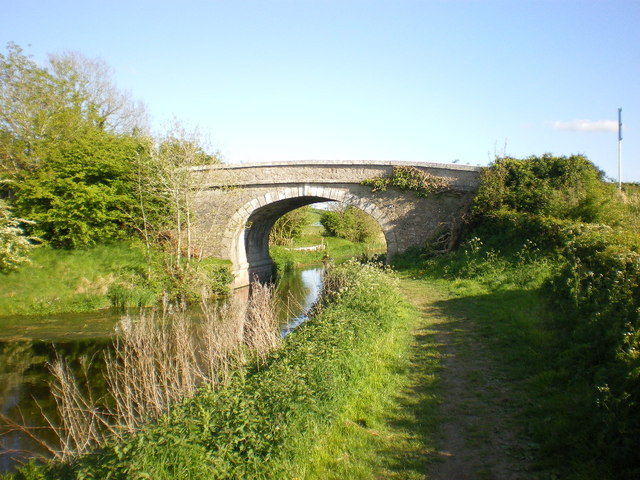
- Yealand road bridge

- Shown within Lancaster district Location within Lancashire
- Area: 8.65 km^{2} (3.34 sq mi)
- Population: 326 (Parish, 2011)
  - Density: 38/km^{2} (98/sq mi)
- OS grid reference: SD500757
- Civil parish: The Yealands
- District: Lancaster
- Shire county: Lancashire
- Region: North West
- Country: England
- Sovereign state: United Kingdom
- Post town: CARNFORTH
- Postcode district: LA5
- Dialling code: 01524
- Police: Lancashire
- Fire: Lancashire
- Ambulance: North West
- UK Parliament: Morecambe and Lunesdale

Yealand Redmayne is a village in the civil parish of The Yealands, in the Lancaster district, in the county of Lancashire, England. In 2011 the former parish of Yealand Redmayne had a population of 326.

== Community ==
The civil parish also included the hamlet of Yealand Storrs. The village borders Yealand Conyers and the villages share their facilities. The shared history of the Yealands goes back to at least the Norman Conquest, and they are recorded in the Domesday Book of 1086 as Jalant (this is presumed to include the area that became Silverdale). The local district also has a strong Viking history as seen in many of the names of nearby geographical features and place names as well as the recent discovery of the Silverdale Hoard in the village. Today, Yealand Redmayne is still the biggest village by area but has a smaller population than Silverdale.

The village contains a busy transport corridor as the A6 and M6 roads as well as the West Coast Main Line and the Lancaster Canal all pass through the parish. There is a miniature railway track near the A6 at Cinderbarrow picnic site.

Yealand-Redmayne was formerly a township in the parish of Warton, in 1866 Yealand Redmayne became a separate civil parish, on 1 April 2024 the parish was abolished and merged with Yealand Conyers to form The Yealands.

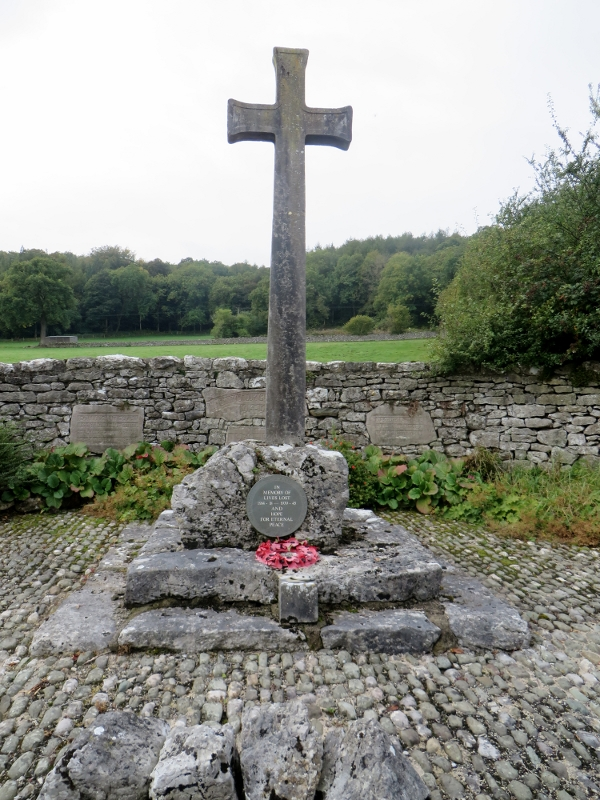
Yealand War Memorial

Yealand Conyers and Yealand Redmayne share a grade II listed war memorial, erected at the former parish boundary in 1920, commemorating six men and one woman who died in World War I and two men who died in World War II. It is in the form of a Latin cross on a shaft arising from a base on a plinth in a cobbled area.

== Geography ==
The village is situated 11 miles north of Lancaster on the county boundary with Cumbria. Carnforth is the nearest town in Lancashire and Milnthorpe in Cumbria.

To the north is Beetham, to the east is Burton and north east Holme while its western boundary is with Silverdale, with Arnside, and the River Kent to the north west. To the south is Yealand Conyers and beyond that is Warton.

It is in the Arnside and Silverdale Area of Outstanding Natural Beauty and contains Gait Barrows National Nature Reserve and Storrs Moss (which comprises part of the Leighton Moss RSPB reserve).

== Gallery ==
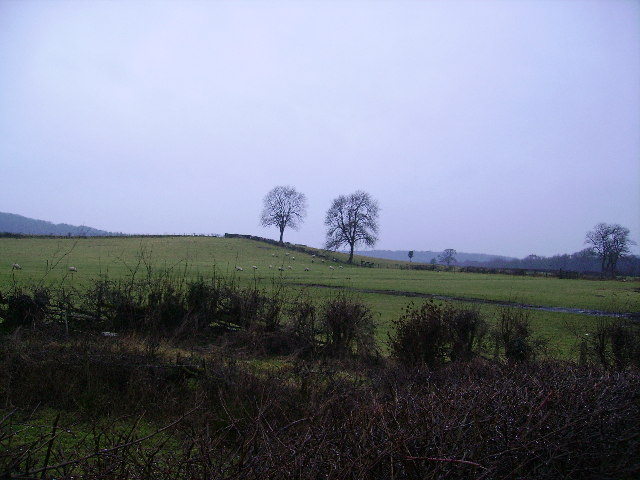
Surrounding farm land

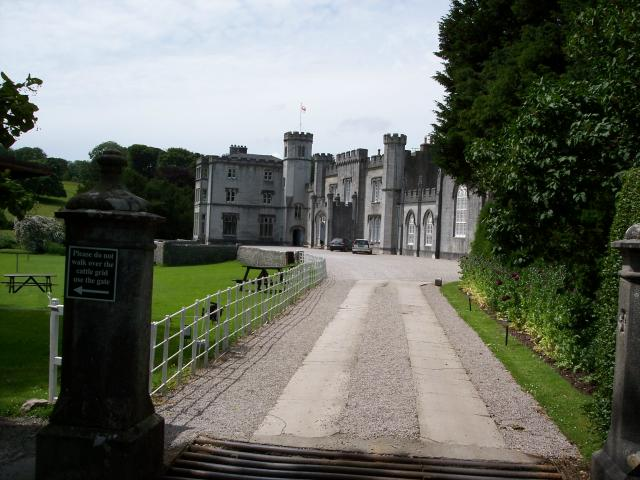
Entrance to Leighton Hall

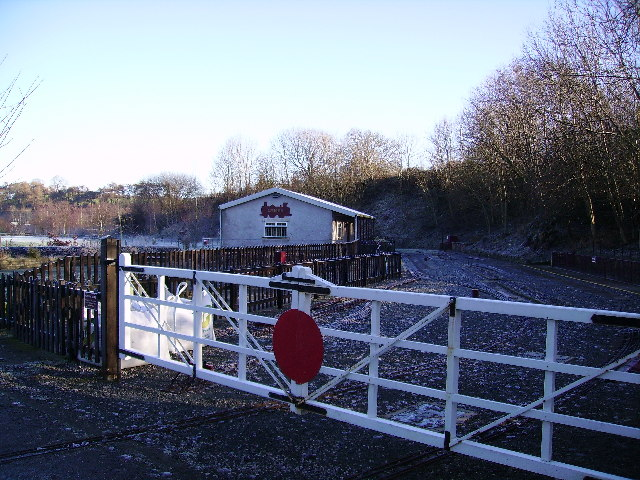
Cinderbarrow Miniature Railway

== See also ==
- Listed buildings in The Yealands
