= Heaton-with-Oxcliffe =

Coordinates: 54.036°N 2.850°W

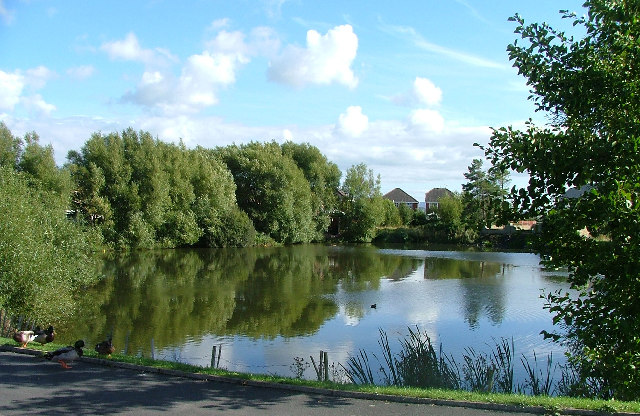
- Duck pond at Cathedral Drive

- Location in the City of Lancaster district Location within Lancashire
- Population: 2,059 (2001)
- OS grid reference: SD443603
- Civil parish: Heaton-with-Oxcliffe
- District: Lancaster
- Shire county: Lancashire
- Region: North West
- Country: England
- Sovereign state: United Kingdom
- Post town: MORECAMBE
- Postcode district: LA3
- Dialling code: 01524
- Police: Lancashire
- Fire: Lancashire
- Ambulance: North West
- UK Parliament: Morecambe and Lunesdale

Heaton-with-Oxcliffe is a civil parish situated near the River Lune. it is in the City of Lancaster and the English county of Lancashire. The parish contains the villages of Heaton, Oxcliffe Hill, plus the area around Salt Ayre, and had a population of 2,225 recorded in the 2001 census, decreasing to 2,059 at the 2011 census.

== The Golden Ball Inn ==
The area around the Golden Ball Inn, in Oxcliffe, is locally known as Snatchems, as it was once a place that press gangs frequented. The front door of the Inn is 6 feet (1.8 m) above the road, as the road frequently floods on a spring tide, the lower car park displaying a white line on the wall, about 5 feet (1.5 m) above the ground, showing the highest level that the Lune reached during a major flood in 1967.

== Notable people ==
- Mary Ann Bibby (c.1832–1910), New Zealand storekeeper, born in Heaton

== See also ==
- Listed buildings in Heaton-with-Oxcliffe
