= Yealand Conyers =

Coordinates: 54.165°N 2.761°W

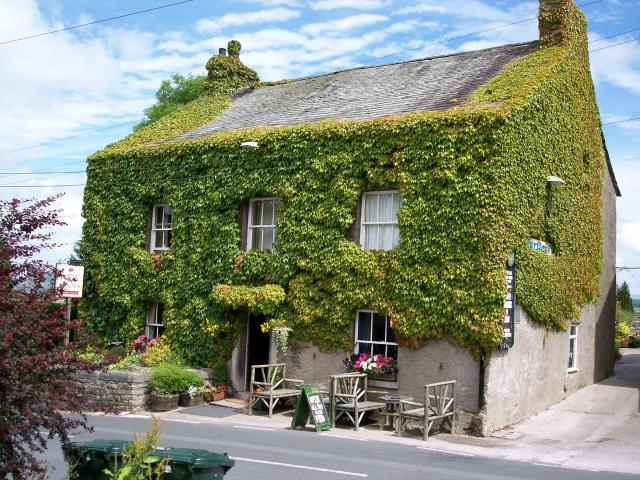
- New Inn

- Shown within Lancaster district Location within Lancashire
- Area: 6.40 km^{2} (2.47 sq mi)
- Population: 190 (Parish, 2011)
  - Density: 30/km^{2} (78/sq mi)
- OS grid reference: SD503746
- Civil parish: The Yealands
- District: Lancaster
- Shire county: Lancashire
- Region: North West
- Country: England
- Sovereign state: United Kingdom
- Post town: CARNFORTH
- Postcode district: LA5
- Dialling code: 01524
- Police: Lancashire
- Fire: Lancashire
- Ambulance: North West
- UK Parliament: Morecambe and Lunesdale

Yealand Conyers is a village in the civil parish of The Yealands, in the Lancaster district, in the county of Lancashire, England. In 2011 the former parish of Yealand Conyers had a population of 190.

== Community ==
The community is in the same electoral district as Yealand Redmayne and Silverdale. The Yealands and Silverdale were originally in the same manor of Yealand in Domesday Book.

Yealand Conyers has three religious institutions, the Church of England St John's and Catholic St Mary's but is particularly of note for its early support of Quakerism. Richard Hubberthorne, one of the early Quaker preachers was from the Yealands. George Fox preached a sermon in the village in 1652 and the village's Meeting House dates from 1692. The Quaker's Old School is today used as a simple hostel and can host people visiting the '1652 country'.

The village has both a manor house and a stately home Leighton Hall. The bulk of the Leighton Moss RSPB reserve is in Yealand Conyers but main visitor access is from Silverdale.

Yealand Conyers was for many years home to the noted Manchester born Quaker writer Elfrida Vipont Foulds. She was the Headmistress of the Yealand Manor Quaker Evacuation School.

Yealand-Conyers was formerly a township and chapelry in the parish of Warton, in 1866 Yealand Conyers became a separate civil parish, on 1 April 2024 the parish was abolished and merged with Yealand Redmayne to form The Yealands.

Yealand Conyers and Yealand Redmayne share a grade II listed war memorial, erected at the former parish boundary in 1920, commemorating six men and one woman who died in World War I and two men who died in World War II. It is in the form of a Latin cross on a shaft rising from a base on a plinth in a cobbled area.

== Geography ==
Like its neighbour, Yealand Redmayne, it is north of Lancaster, and close to the border of Cumbria.

To the north is Yealand Redmayne and beyond that is Beetham and Milnthorpe, to its north east is Holme, with Arnside on the River Kent estuary to the north west while Warton is to the south.

== Gallery ==
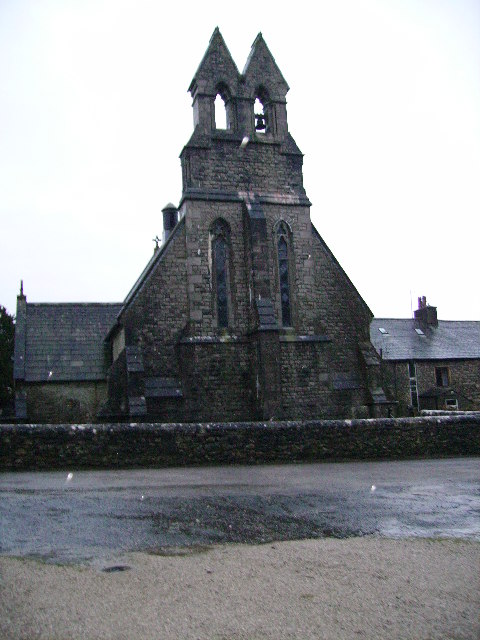
St. Mary's Church

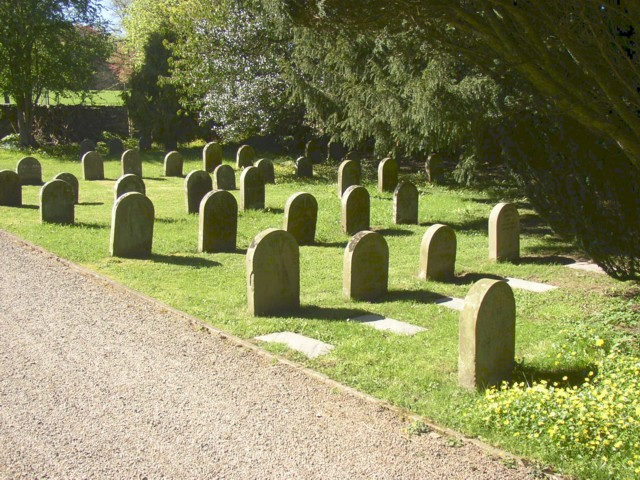
Friends' Meeting House graveyard

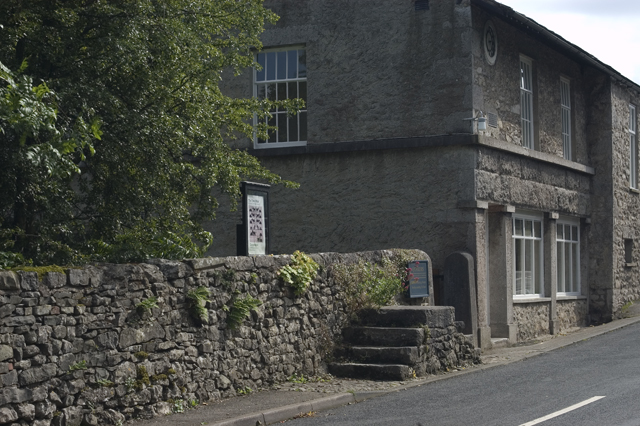
Yealand Old School

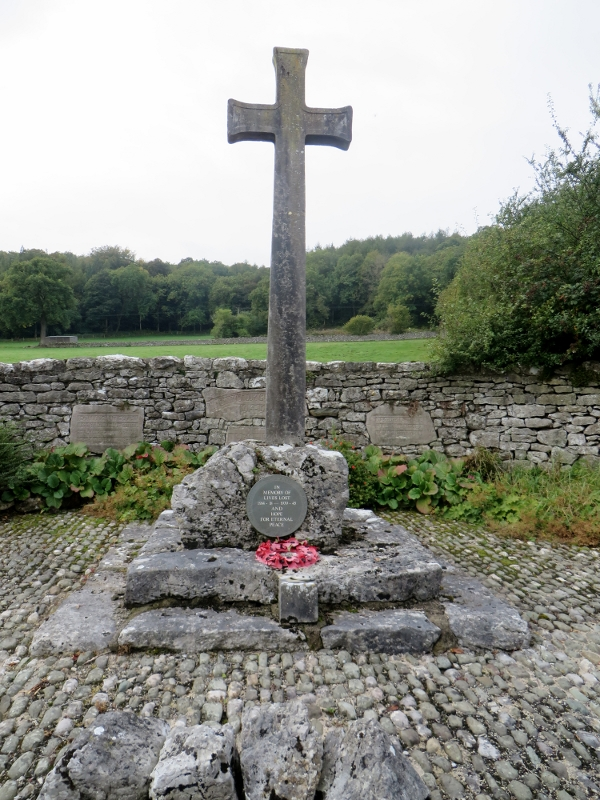
Yealand War Memorial

== See also ==
- Listed buildings in The Yealands
