= Leighton Hall, Lancashire =

Listed building in Lancashire, England

Leighton Hall
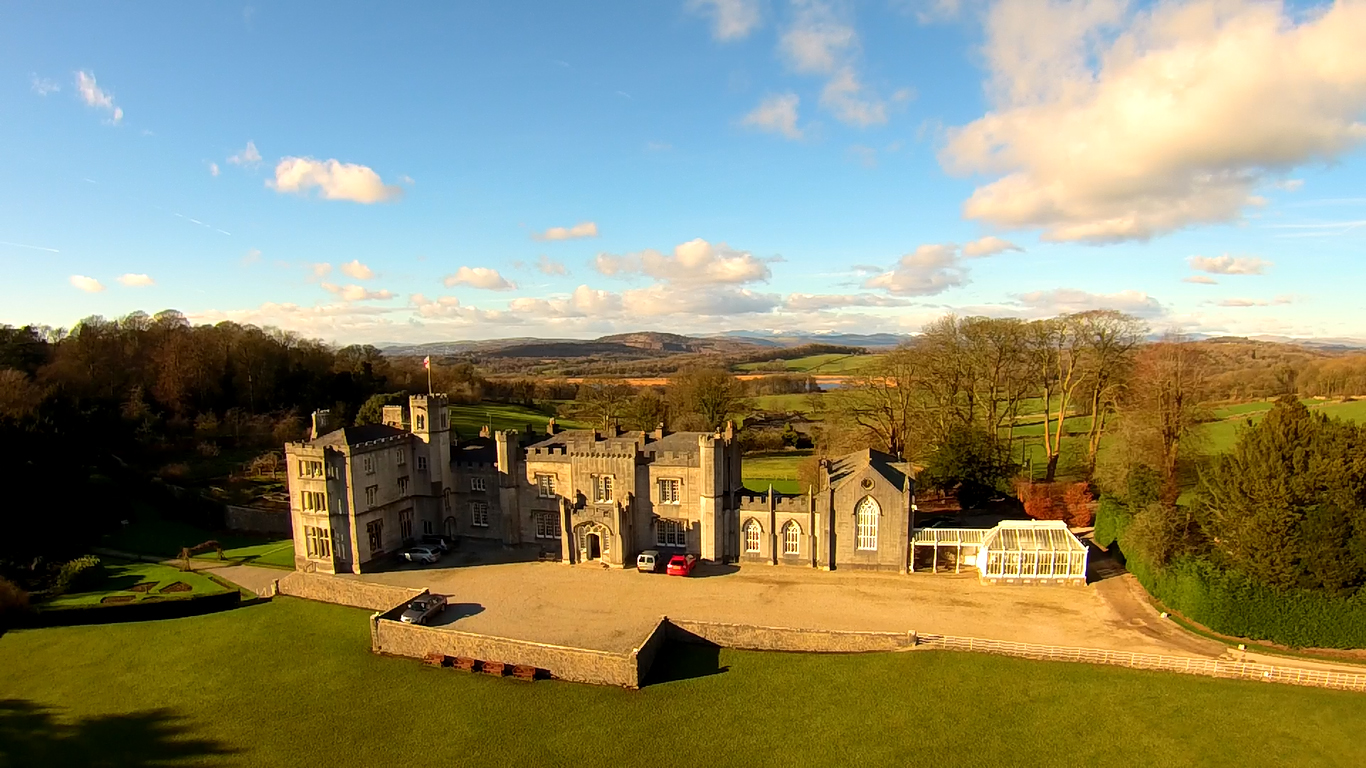
- View of Leighton Hall

- Location in the City of Lancaster district

General information
- Architectural style: Georgian, Gothic Revival
- Location: Yealand Conyers, Lancashire, England
- Coordinates: 54.1630°N 2.7758°W
- Elevation: 200 feet (61 m)
- Year built: 1759–61
- Renovated: 1870 (restored)

Design and construction
- Architects: John Hird; Paley and Austin

Listed Building – Grade II*
- Official name: Leighton Hall
- Designated: 2 May 1968
- Reference no.: 1071836

Leighton Hall is a historic house 0.5 miles (1 km) to the west of Yealand Conyers in Lancashire, England. It is recorded in the National Heritage List for England as a designated Grade II* listed building.

== History ==
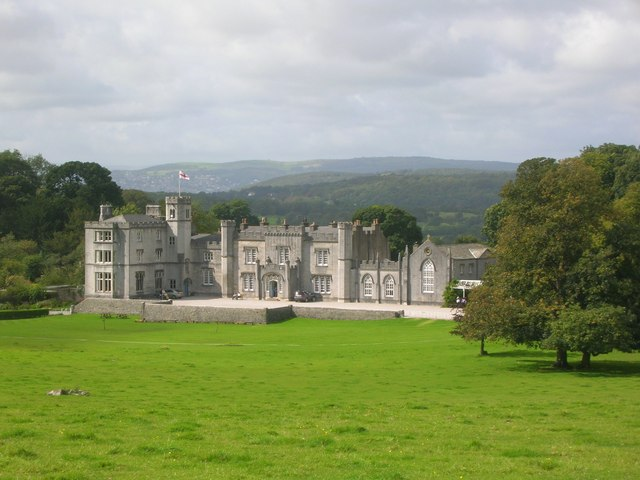

It was the seat of the 1642–1673 Middleton Baronetcy of Sir George Middleton, who was High Sheriff of Lancashire for 1661. He was succeeded by his grandson, George Middleton Oldfield, who died at the hall in 1708. It then passed to his son-in-law Albert Hodgson, who had married Oldfield's daughter Dorothy. Hodgson became involved in the Jacobite rising of 1715, during which he was taken prisoner, and the house burnt with Hodgson's possessions confiscated. When the hall was sold at public auction in 1722 it was bought by a friend, a Mr Winkley from Preston, who allowed Hodgson to live in the partly ruined house after his eventual release from prison. The estate then came into the possession of wealthy George Towneley of Towneley Hall in Burnley, through his marriage to Hodgson's daughter Mary in the 1750s.

The present house was built for Towneley in 1759–61 in Georgian style to a design by John Hird, and the woods replanted and park laid out in 1763. The couple had no children, and the estate was inherited by George's nephew John, who sold it in 1805. In 1822 the property came into the possession of Richard Gillow, the grandson of furniture manufacturer Robert Gillow, who Gothicised the façade in 1822–25 using local white limestone.^{[A]} In 1870 his son, Richard Thomas Gillow, commissioned the Lancaster architects Paley and Austin to add a three-storey wing containing a billiard room below, and guest rooms above. Richard died in 1906, leaving the hall in a neglected condition and was succeeded by his grandson, Charles Richard Gillow, who died in 1923. Charles' widow continued to live at the hall until her own death in 1966 at the age of 96. The property then passed via her daughter Helen to her grandson, Richard Gillow Reynolds who, with his wife Susan, is the current owner.

In October 2021, the building was one of 142 sites across England to receive part of a £35-million injection into the government's Culture Recovery Fund. The hall won the 2023 Sustainability Award of the Historic Houses Association.

The hall was featured in the 1984 ITV TV adaptation of the Sherlock Holmes story The Adventure of the Dancing Men, as Ridling Thorpe Manor.

== See also ==
- Grade II* listed buildings in Lancashire
- Listed buildings in Yealand Conyers
- List of non-ecclesiastical works by Paley and Austin

== Notes ==
^{A} This work has been attributed to Robert Roper.
