= City of Lancaster =

Lancaster
- City and non-metropolitan district
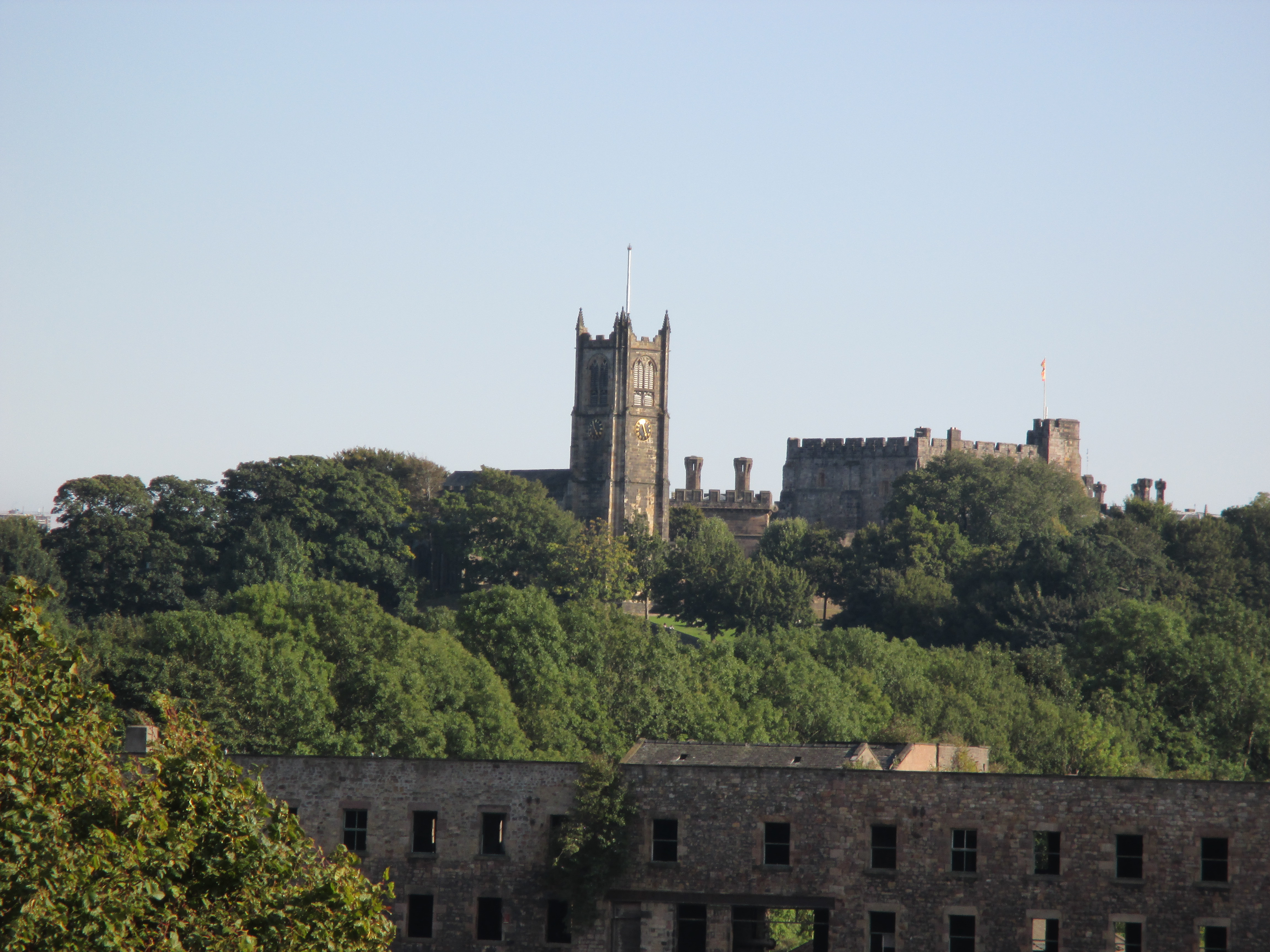
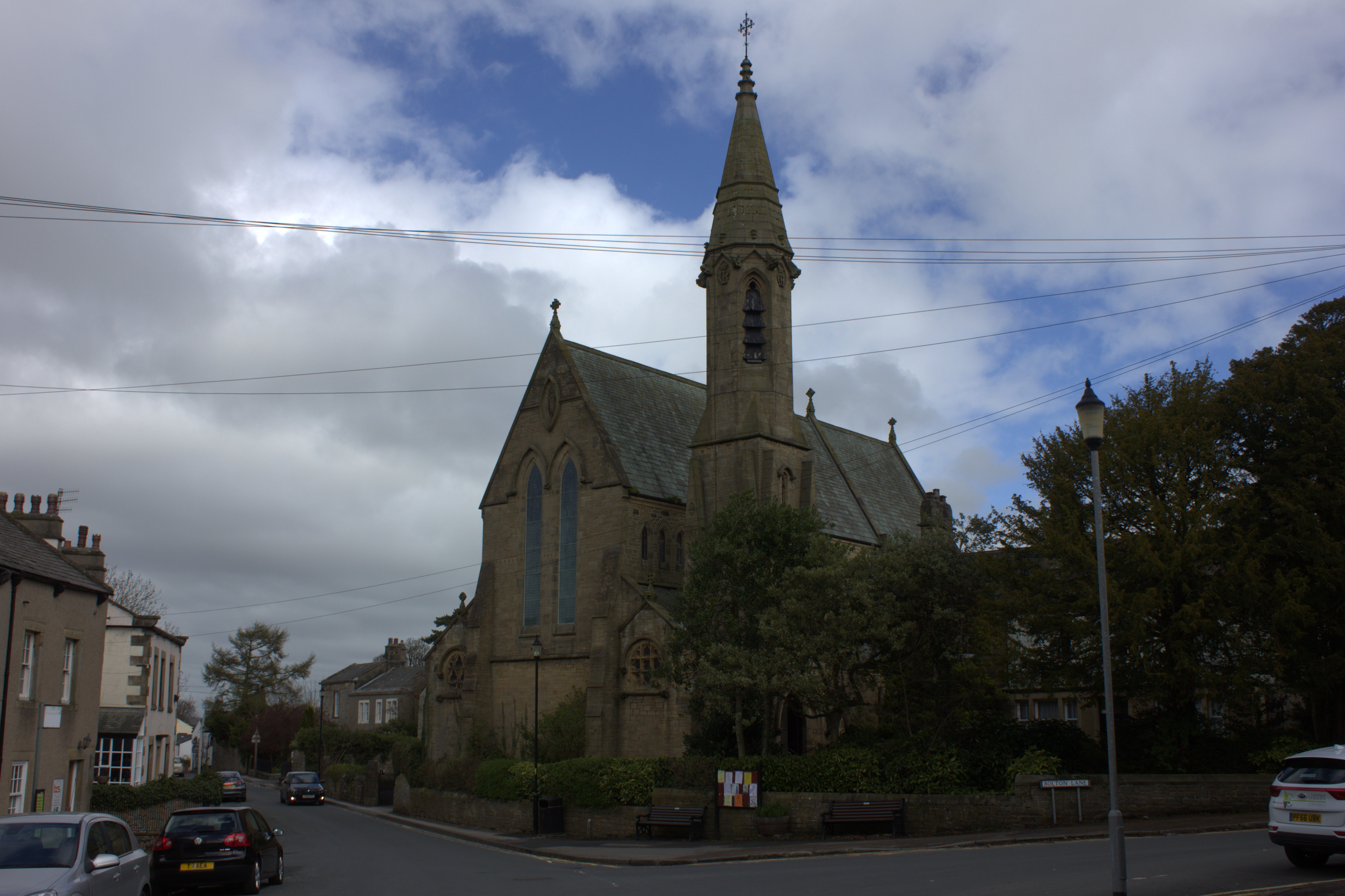
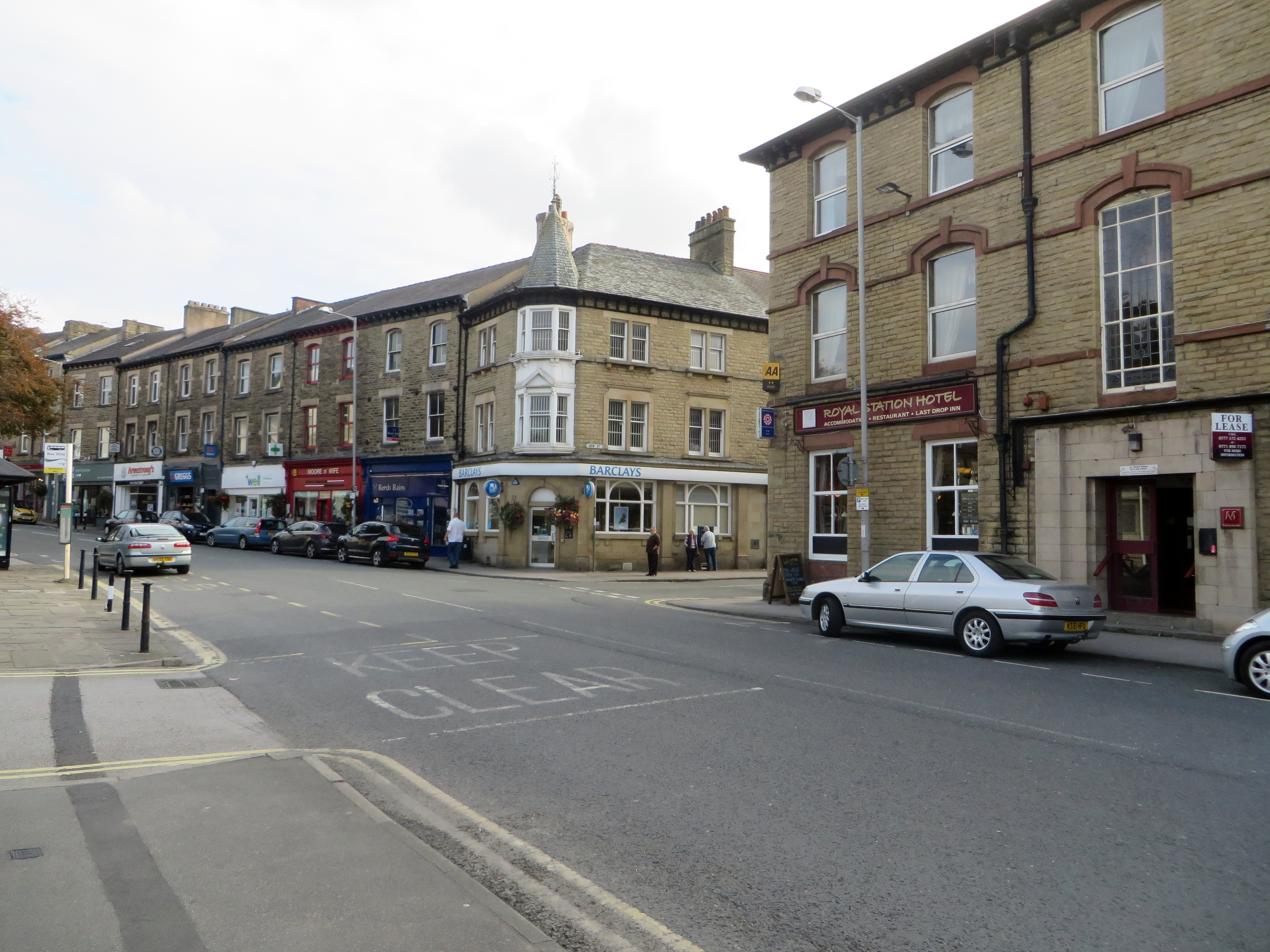
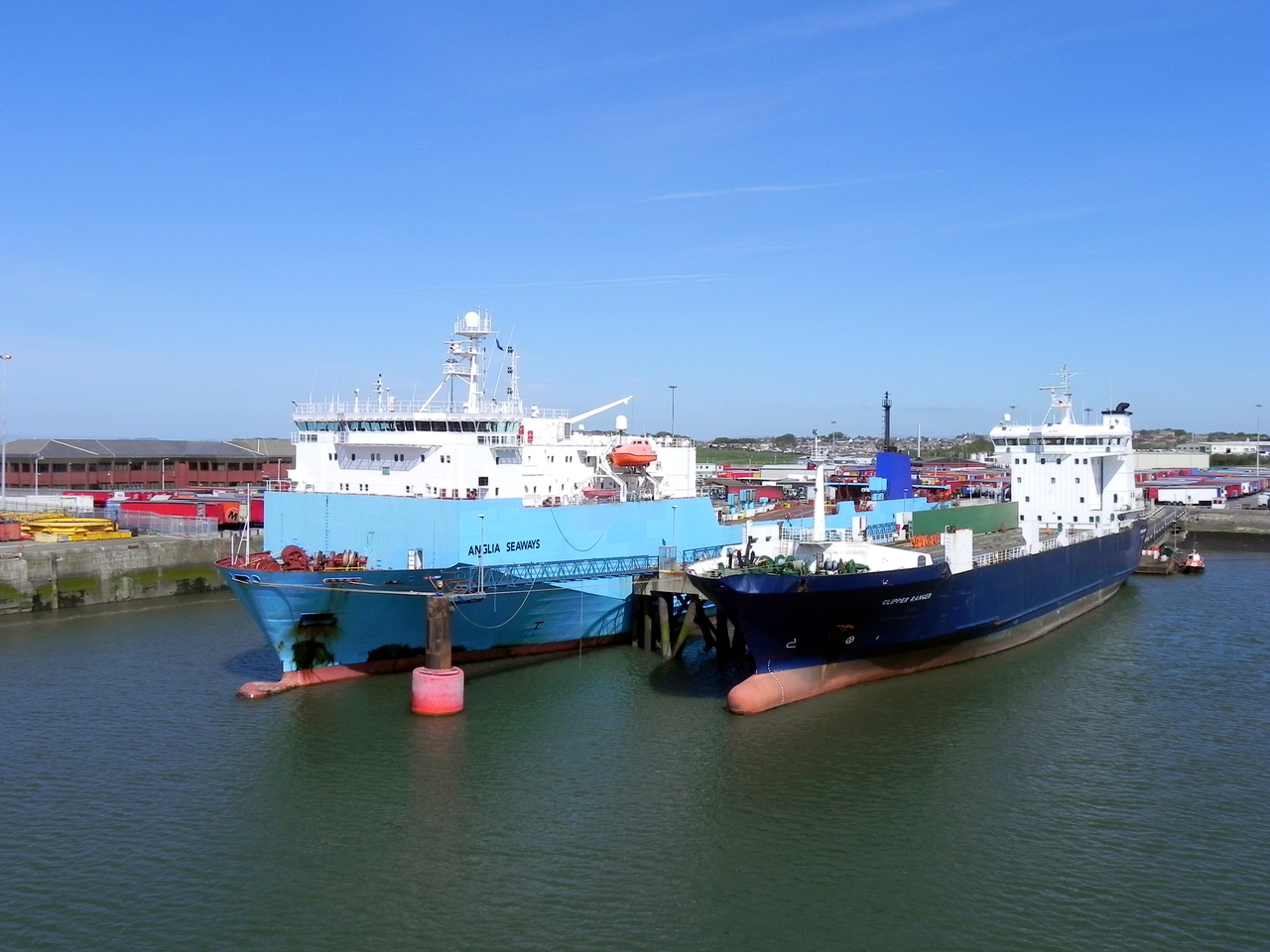
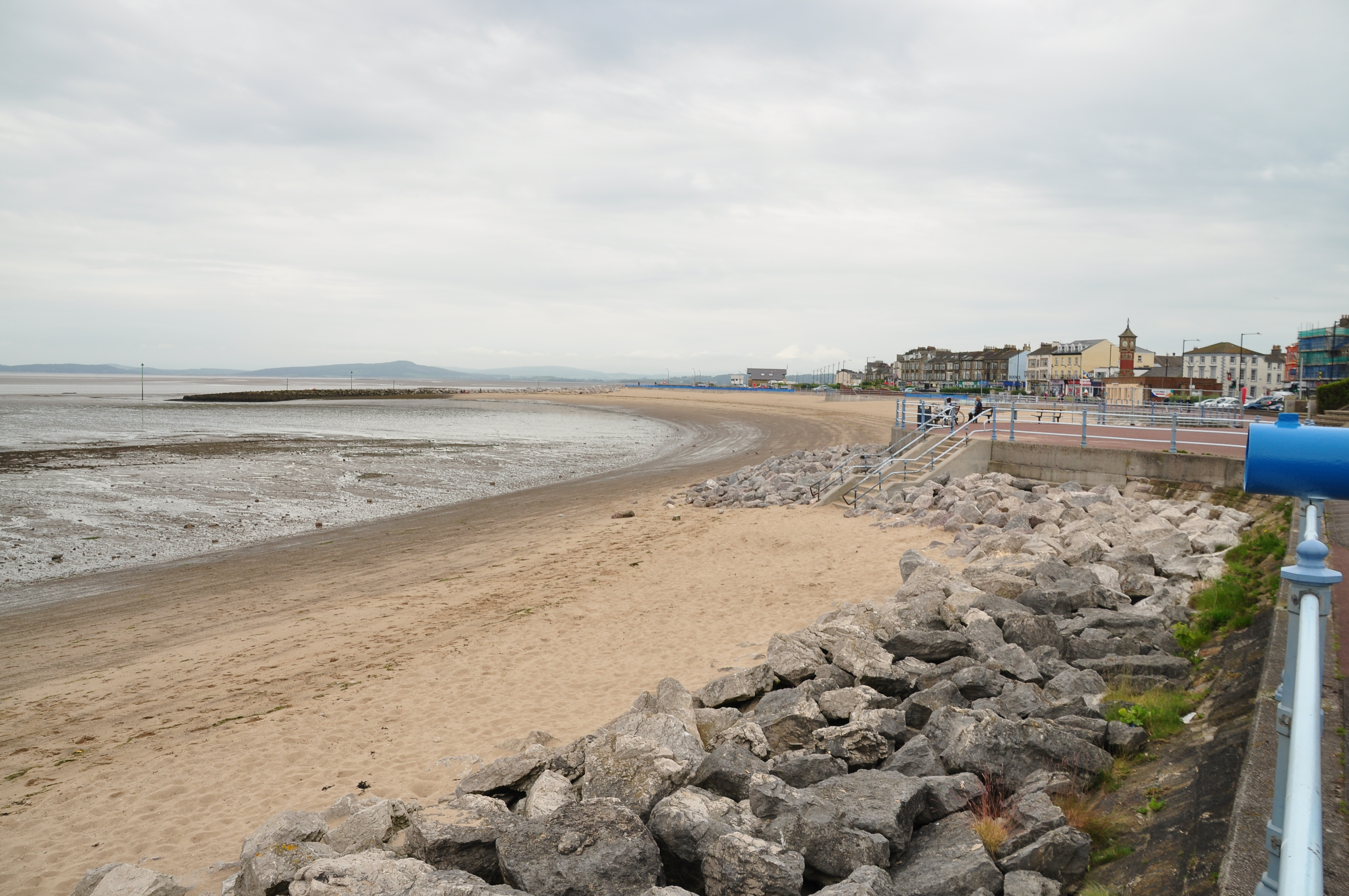
- From left to right; Top: Lancaster Castle and Priory Church; Middle: Bolton-le-Sands village centre and Carnforth town centre; Bottom: Heysham Harbour and Morecambe Beach

- Coat of arms of Lancaster City Council
- Motto: "Luck to Loyne"
- Lancaster shown within Lancashire
- Coordinates: 54°2′49.2″N 2°48′3.6″W
- Sovereign state: United Kingdom
- Country: England
- Region: North West England
- Ceremonial county: Lancashire
- City status: 14 May 1937
- Administrative HQ: Lancaster (Town Hall); Morecambe (Town Hall)

Government
  - Type: Non-metropolitan district
  - Body: Lancaster City Council

Area
  - Total: 219 sq mi (567 km^{2})
  - Rank: 69th

Population (2025)
  - Total: 145,237
  - Rank: 161st
  - Density: 660/sq mi (256/km^{2})

Ethnicity (2021)
  - Ethnic groups: List: 93.1% White; 3.6% Asian; 1.5% Mixed; 0.9% other; 0.9% Black

Religion (2021)
  - Religion: List: 51.8% Christianity; 38.1% no religion; 6.6% not stated; 1.6% Islam; 0.6% other; 0.4% Hinduism; 0.4% Buddhism; 0.1% Sikhism; 0.1% Judaism
- Time zone: UTC+0 (Greenwich Mean Time)
  - Summer (DST): UTC+1 (British Summer Time)
- Postcode areas: LA
- Dialling codes: 01524 (Lancaster); 015242(Hornby-with-Farleton)
- Vehicle registration prefix: P
- GSS code: E07000121
- NUTS 3 code: UKD44
- ONS code: 30UH
- OS grid reference: SD475615
- Motorways: M6; A601(M)
- Major railway stations: Lancaster (B)
- Councillors: 61
- MPs: Cat Smith (L); Lizzi Collinge (L)
- Police area: Lancashire
- Fire service: Lancashire
- Ambulance service: North West

The City of Lancaster, officially simply Lancaster (/ˈlæŋkæstər/), is a local government district with city status in Lancashire, England. It is named after its largest settlement, Lancaster, and also includes the towns of Carnforth, Heysham and Morecambe and a wider rural hinterland. The district has a population of 145,237 (2025), and an area of 219 square miles (567 km^{2}).

Much of the district's rural area is recognised for its natural beauty; it includes part of the Yorkshire Dales National Park and parts of the designated Areas of Outstanding Natural Beauty of Arnside and Silverdale and the Forest of Bowland. The neighbouring districts are Westmorland and Furness, North Yorkshire, Ribble Valley and Wyre.

== History ==
The town of Lancaster was an ancient borough, with its earliest known charter dating from 1193. A later charter in 1337 gave it the right to appoint a mayor. It was reformed to become a municipal borough in 1836, governed by a body formally called the "mayor, aldermen and burgesses of the borough of Lancaster", but generally known as the corporation or town council. In 1937 the borough was awarded city status.

The modern district was created on 1 April 1974 under the Local Government Act 1972, covering the territory of five former districts which were abolished at the same time:

- Carnforth Urban District
- Lancaster Municipal Borough
- Lancaster Rural District
- Lunesdale Rural District
- Morecambe and Heysham Municipal Borough

The new district was awarded borough status from its creation, allowing the chair of the council to take the title of mayor, continuing Lancaster's series of mayors dating back to 1337. The city status which had been held by the old municipal borough of Lancaster since 1937 was also transferred to the new district on its creation.

Since 1 August 2016 the district has included a small part of the Yorkshire Dales National Park.

Under current local government reorganisation plans, all district councils in Lancashire, as well as the county council, will be abolished in 2028, with the district becoming part of a new North Lancashire unitary authority.

== Governance ==
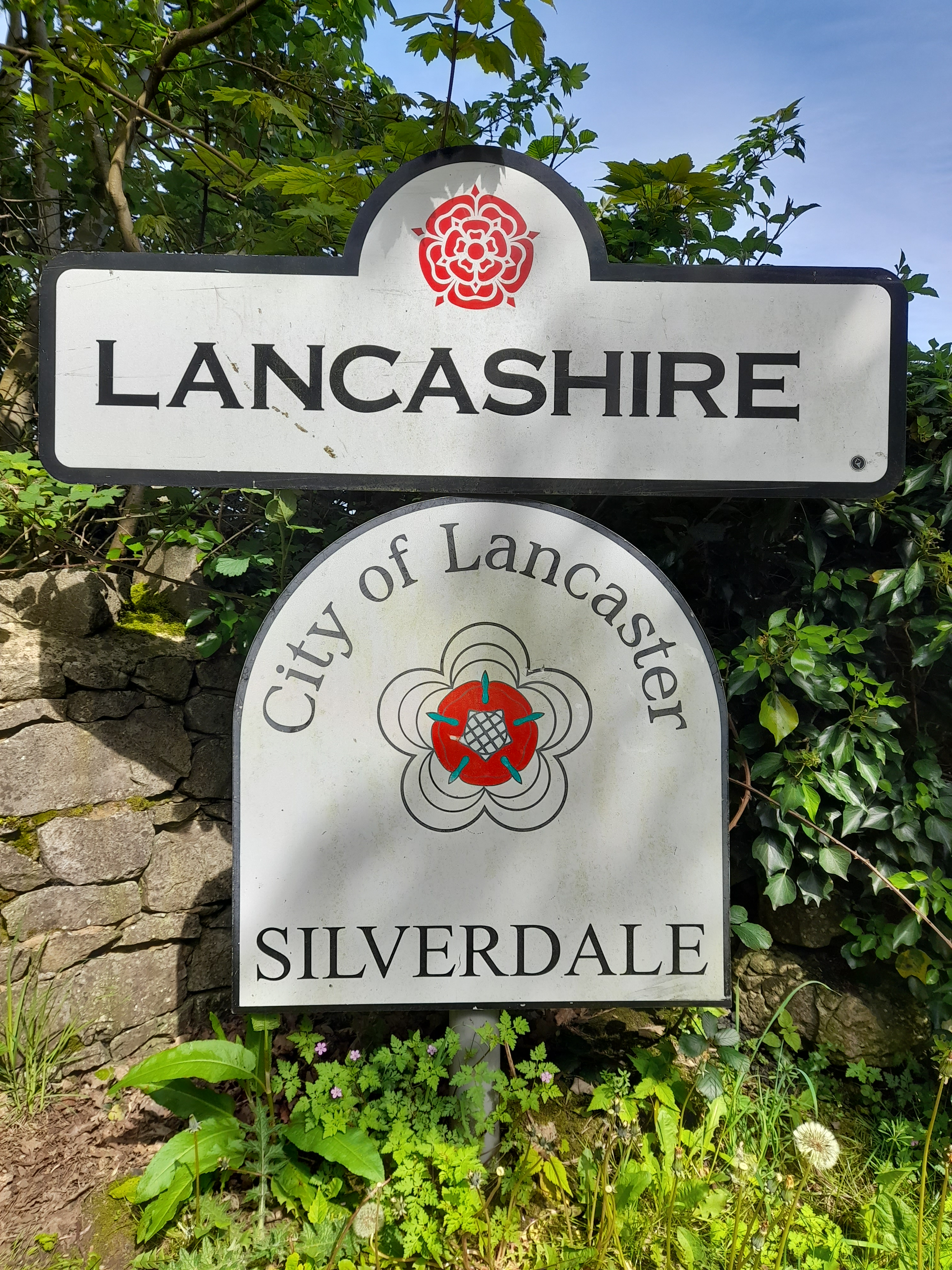
Sign at entry into the county and district, showing use of name "City of Lancaster"

Lancaster City Council

Leadership
- Mayor: Colin Hartley, Labour since 15 May 2026
- Leader: Caroline Jackson, Green since 22 May 2023
- Chief Executive: Mark Davies since 2022

Structure
- Seats: 61 councillors
- Graph of the party split among 61 seats.
- Political groups: Administration (33) Green (24) Liberal Democrats (7) MB Independent (2) Other parties (28) Labour (20) Conservative (5) Independent (3)
- Length of term: 4 years

Elections
- Voting system: First past the post
- Last election: 4 May 2023
- Next election: 6 May 2027

Meeting place
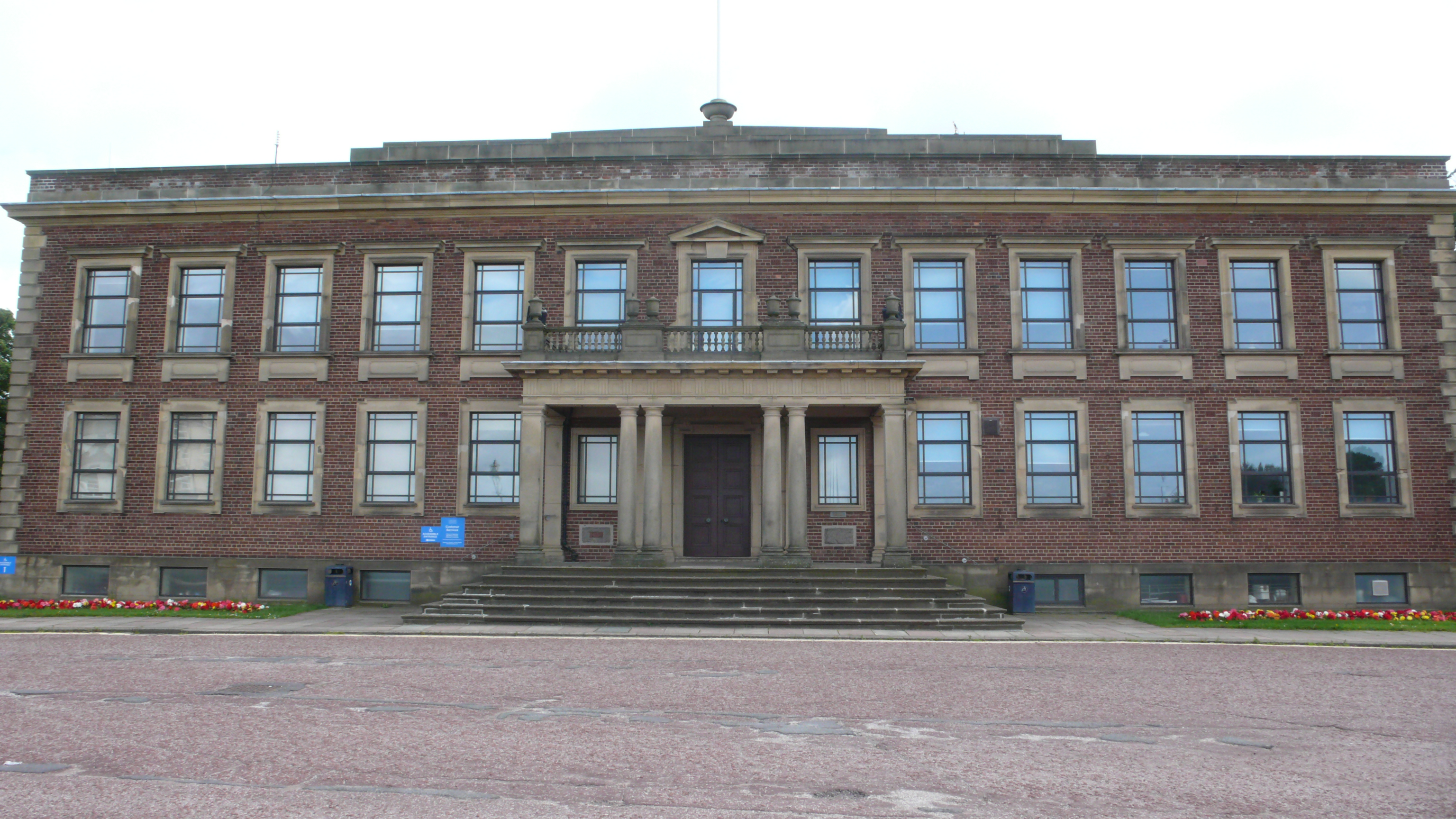
- Town Hall, Marine Road East, Morecambe, LA4 5AF

Website
- www.lancaster.gov.uk

Lancaster City Council provides district-level services. County-level services are provided by Lancashire County Council. Much of the district is covered by civil parishes, which form a third tier of local government.

In the part of the district within the Yorkshire Dales National Park, town planning is the responsibility of the Yorkshire Dales National Park Authority. The city council appoints one of its councillors to serve on the 25-person National Park Authority.

=== Political control ===
The council has been under no overall control since 2019. An administration led by the Green Party formed in November 2024, with cabinet positions being shared between the Greens, Liberal Democrats and local party the Morecambe Bay Independents.

The first election to the city council as enlarged by the Local Government Act 1972 was held in 1973, initially operating as a shadow authority alongside the outgoing authorities before coming into its powers on 1 April 1974. Political control of the council since 1974 has been as follows:

Party	Period
Conservative	1974–1987
No overall control	1987–1995
Labour	1995–1999
No overall control	1999–2017
Labour	2017–2019
No overall control	2019–present

=== Leadership ===
The role of mayor is largely ceremonial in Lancaster, with political leadership instead provided by the leader of the council. The leaders since 1993 have been:

Councillor	Party	From	To
Stanley Henig	Labour	pre-1993	May 1999
Tricia Heath	Morecambe Bay Independents	May 1999	May 2003
Ian Barker	Labour	May 2003	May 2007
Roger Mace	Conservative	21 May 2007	4 Feb 2009
Abbott Bryning	Labour	4 Feb 2009	May 2009
Stuart Langhorn	Liberal Democrats	18 May 2009	May 2011
Eileen Blamire	Labour	23 May 2011	May 2019
Erica Lewis	Labour	20 May 2019	May 2021
Caroline Jackson	Green	17 May 2021	May 2023
Phillip Black	Labour	22 May 2023	13 Nov 2024
Caroline Jackson	Green	25 Nov 2024	

=== Composition ===
Following the 2023 election, and subsequent changes of allegiance up to September 2026, the composition of the council was:

Party	Seats
Green	23
Labour	20
Liberal Democrats	7
Conservative	5
MB Independent	3
Independent	3
Total	61

Two of the three independent councillors sit together as a group. The next election is due in 2027.

=== Elections ===
Since the last boundary changes in 2023 the council has comprised 61 councillors representing 27 wards, with each ward electing one, two or three councillors. Elections are held every four years.

The district contains parts of two parliamentary constituencies: Lancaster and Wyre and Morecambe and Lunesdale. Both have been held by Labour since 2024.

The district contains 10 of the 82 electoral divisions for elections to Lancashire County Council: Heysham, Lancaster Central, Lancaster East, Lancaster Rural East, Lancaster Rural North, Lancaster South East, Morecambe Central, Morecambe North, Morecambe South, and Skerton. Elections are held every four years. In the 2025 county council elections, Reform UK won control of the county and seven of the district's seats, the other three being won by the Green Party of England and Wales.

UK Youth Parliament

Elections for the UK Youth Parliament are held in a manner similar to local elections. Votes are cast by 11-18-year-olds and determine the Members of Youth Parliament, who serve two-year terms. Elections take place at different times across the country, those in Lancaster are typically held in early spring every two years.

The current Members of Youth Parliament for the 2026/27 term are James McCafferty and Emilia Ficorilli.

=== Premises ===
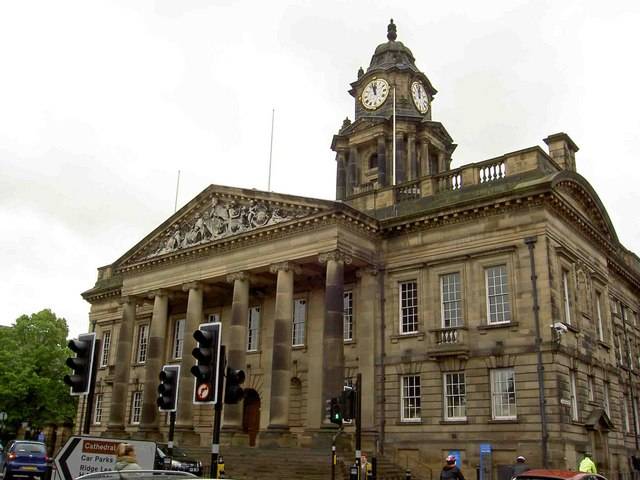
Town Hall, Dalton Square, Lancaster

The council has two main meeting places, both inherited from predecessor authorities: Lancaster Town Hall and Morecambe Town Hall. Full council meetings are held in the larger council chamber of Morecambe Town Hall, but Lancaster Town Hall is also used for committee meetings and houses administrative functions.

== Demography ==
Population pyramid of the City of Lancaster in 2020

Lancaster compared
2001 UK Census	Lancaster	Lancashire	England	United Kingdom
Total population	133,914	1,134,974	49,138,831	58,789,194
White	97.8%	94.7%	90.9%	92.14%
Asian	0.7%	4.1%	4.6%	3.4%
Black	0.2%	0.2%	2.3%	2%

At the 2011 UK census, the City of Lancaster had a total population of 138,375. Of the 57,822 households in the city, 33.5% were married couples living together, 31.9% were one-person households, 7.8% were co-habiting couples and 10.0% were lone parents. These figures were similar to the national averages.

The population density was 233/km^{2} (600/sq mi) and for every 100 females, there were 91.8 males. Of those aged 16–74 in Lancaster, 26.7% had no academic qualifications, lower than 28.9% in all of England. The city of Lancaster had a higher proportion of white people than England.

=== Population change ===
The table below details the population change since 1801, including the percentage change since the last available census data. Although the City of Lancaster has existed as a district since 1974, figures have been generated by combining data from the towns, villages, and civil parishes that would later be constituent parts of the city.

Population growth in City of Lancaster since 1801

Year	Population	±%
1801	23,818	—
1811	24,842	+4.3%
1821	28,374	+14.2%
1831	30,987	+9.2%
1841	32,998	+6.5%
1851	33,437	+1.3%
1861	37,943	+13.5%
1871	42,450	+11.9%

Year	Population	±%
1881	46,956	+10.6%
1891	57,577	+22.6%
1901	64,617	+12.2%
1911	72,538	+12.3%
1921	77,409	+6.7%
1931	82,622	+6.7%
1941	92,752	+12.3%
1951	104,126	+12.3%

Year	Population	±%
1961	113,083	+8.6%
1971	122,820	+8.6%
1981	118,599	−3.4%
1991	130,022	+9.6%
2001	133,914	+3.0%
2011	138,375	+3.3%

Source: Vision of Britain

=== Religion ===
Lancaster compared
2011 UK Census	City of Lancaster	Lancashire	England
Population	138,375	1,134,974	49,138,831
Christian	65.9%	68.8%	59.4%
Muslim	1.3%	4.8%	5.0%
No religion	24.5%	19.2%	24.7%

At the 2011 UK census, 65.9% of Lancaster's population reported themselves as Christian, 1.3% Muslim, 0.4% Buddhist, 0.3% Hindu, 0.1% Jewish, and 0.1% Sikh. 24.5% had no religion, 0.5% had an alternative religion and 7.1% did not state their religion. The city is covered by the Roman Catholic Diocese of Lancaster, and the Church of England Diocese of Blackburn.

== Economy ==
City of Lancaster compared
2001 UK Census	City of Lancaster	Lancashire	England
Population of working age	97,365	814,434	35,532,091
Full-time employment	33.5%	39.2%	40.8%
Part-time employment	12.7%	12.2%	11.8%
Self employed	7.8%	8.2%	8.3%
Unemployed	3.6%	2.9%	3.3%
Retired	14.9%	15.0%	13.5%

At the United Kingdom Census 2001, the City of Lancaster had 97,365 residents aged 16 to 74. Of these people, 4.0% were students with jobs, 9.6% students without jobs, 5.1% looking after home or family, 6.0% permanently sick or disabled and 2.8% economically inactive for other reasons.

In 2001, of the 55,906 residents of the City of Lancaster in employment, the industry of employment was 16.7% retail and wholesale, 14.2% health and social work, 11.4% education, 11.2% manufacturing, 7.8% property and business services, 6.7% construction, 6.7% hotels and restaurants, 6.5% transport and communications, 5.7% public administration and defence, 2.5% finance, 2.4% energy and water supply, 2.2% agriculture, 0.4% mining, and 5.3% other. This was roughly in line with national figures, although the proportion of jobs in agriculture which was more than the national average of 1.5% and the percentage of people working in finance was below the national average of 4.8%; the proportion of people working in property was well below the national average of 13.2%.

== Media ==
The area is served by BBC North West and ITV Granada.

Radio stations for the area are BBC Radio Lancashire, BBC Radio Cumbria, Heart North West, Smooth North West, and Greatest Hits Radio Lancashire. Beyond Radio is a voluntary, non-profit community radio station for Lancaster and Morecambe.

== Settlements ==
Towns, villages and hills in the City of Lancaster district Area of Outstanding Natural Beauty

=== Civil parishes ===

Most of the district's area is covered by civil parishes. The parish councils for Carnforth and Morecambe have declared their parishes to be towns, allowing them to take the style "town council".

1. Aldcliffe-with-Stodday
2. Arkholme-with-Cawood
3. Bolton-le-Sands
4. Borwick
5. Burrow-with-Burrow
6. Cantsfield
7. Carnforth
8. Caton-with-Littledale
9. Claughton
10. Cockerham
11. Ellel
12. Gressingham
13. Halton-with-Aughton
14. Heaton-with-Oxcliffe
15. Hornby-with-Farleton
16. Ireby
17. Leck
18. Melling-with-Wrayton
19. Middleton
20. Morecambe
21. Nether Kellet
22. Over Kellet
23. Over Wyresdale
24. Overton
25. Priest Hutton
26. Quernmore
27. Roeburndale
28. Scotforth
29. Silverdale
30. Slyne-with-Hest
31. Tatham
32. Thurnham
33. Tunstall
34. Warton
35. Wennington
36. Whittington
37. Wray-with-Botton
38. Yealand Conyers
39. Yealand Redmayne

Most of the area of the pre-1974 city of Lancaster is an unparished area, as is the Heysham area of the former borough of Morecambe and Heysham.

== Twin towns ==
- Perpignan, France (since 1962)
- Rendsburg, Germany (since 1968)
- Aalborg, Denmark (since 1982)
- Lublin, Poland (since 1994)
- Växjö, Sweden (since 1996)

=== Associate towns ===
- Almere, Netherlands
- Viana do Castelo, Portugal
