= List of works by Paley, Austin and Paley =

Output of English architectural firm

Paley, Austin and Paley was the title of a practice of architects in Lancaster, Lancashire in the 19th century. The practice had been founded in 1836 by Edmund Sharpe. The architects during the period covered by this list are E. G. Paley, Hubert Austin and E. G. Paley's son Henry Paley. Henry Paley became a partner in 1886 and this partnership continued until the death of E. G. Paley in 1895.

This list covers the works executed by the practice during the partnership of Paley, Austin and Paley. Because of the location of the practice, most of their ecclesiastical work was in the areas that are now Cumbria, Lancashire, and Greater Manchester, but examples can also be found in Cheshire, Merseyside, Yorkshire, Worcestershire and the West Midlands.

== Key ==
Grade	Criteria
Grade I	Buildings of exceptional interest, sometimes considered to be internationally important.
Grade II*	Particularly important buildings of more than special interest.
Grade II	Buildings of national importance and special interest.
"—" denotes a work that is not graded.

== Works ==
Name	Location	Photograph	Date	Notes	Grade
St James' Church	Scarborough, North Yorkshire; 54.2739°N 0.4155°W	—	1885	A new mission church. This was enlarged in 1894 by the addition of aisles, a porch. and a vestry.	II
West range	Rossall School, Fleetwood, Lancashire; 53.8959°N 3.0457°W	—	1885	West range added.	II
St Andrew's Church	Sedbergh, Cumbria; 54.3231°N 2.5285°W		1885–86	Restoration, including rebuilding the south aisle and arcade, removing the galleries, adding new floors, roofs, and fittings.	I
Giggleswick School	Giggleswick, North Yorkshire; 54.0728°N 2.2939°W	—	1886	Classroom, gym and covered playground.	II
Church of St James the Less	Tatham, Lancashire; 54.1191°N 2.6045°W		1886–87	Restoration, including new windows, floors and fittings, and the removal of the ceiling.	II*
St Mary's Church	Ince-in-Makerfield, Greater Manchester		1887	A new church in red brick. Towards the east end was a bellcote surmounted by a tall, narrow spire. The aisles were very narrow, forming passages. It was demolished in 1978 due to subsidence from mining. Described as a "grand church".	—
Christ Church School	Lancaster, Lancashire	—	1887	Added a classroom.	—
Storey Institute	Meeting House Lane, Lancaster, Lancashire; 54.0487°N 2.8042°W		1887–91	A school, library and art gallery built at the expense of Sir Thomas Storey in Jacobean style; now offices and an art gallery.	II
Royal Albert Hospital	Lancaster, Lancashire; 54.0336°N 2.8008°W		1888	Added a recreational hall.	—
Thurland Castle	Tunstall, Lancashire; 54.1520°N 2.5978°W		1888	Additional work on the house which is now divided into apartments.	—
St Margaret's Church	Hornby, Lancashire; 54.1114°N 2.6362°W		1888–89	Restoration in which the nave was largely rebuilt, arcades and a clerestory were inserted, the church was reroofed and refloored, the west gallery was removed, the box pews were replaced by modern seating, the vestry was converted into an organ chamber, and a new vestry was built.	I
St Mary's Church	Prestwich, Greater Manchester; 53.5294°N 2.2865°W		1888–89	Addition of a chancel, chapel, organ chamber and choir vestry.	I
Church of the Good Shepherd	Tatham, Lancashire; 54.0831°N 2.5303°W	—	1888–89	New church on the site of a previous church in late Perpendicular style.	II
Chapel, Abberley Hall	Abberley, Worcestershire; 52.2956°N 2.3761°W	—	1889	New school chapel.	—
St Paul's Church	Witherslack, Cumbria; 54.2503°N 2.8736°W		1889	Oak reredos.	II*
Holy Trinity Church	Wray, Lancashire; 54.1025°N 2.6074°W		1889	Addition of a new nave roof and alteration to the west elevation.	—
St Peter's vicarage	Accrington, Lancashire; 53.7495°N 2.3755°W	—	1889	New vicarage.	—
Hornby Castle	Hornby, Lancashire; 54.1114°N 2.6323°W		1889	Further additions to the west side.	I
St John's Church	Birkdale, Southport, Merseyside; 53.6228°N 3.0138°W		1889–90	New church, enlarged in 1903–09.	II
St John's Church	Cloughfold, Rawtenstall, Lancashire; 53.7008°N 2.2867°W		1889–90	New church in Perpendicular style. Has been made redundant, and used as a warehouse.	II
St Bartholomew's Church	Colne, Lancashire; 53.8573°N 2.1704°W		1889–90	North aisle rebuilt, organ chamber, vestries, and furnishings added.	I
St Andrew's Church	Dent, Cumbria; 54.2781°N 2.4542°W		1889–90	Restoration.	I
St Peter's Church	Cound, Shropshire; 52.6409°N 2.6543°W		1889–91	North vestry added, re-using a 13th-century priest's doorway.	I
St Michael's Church	Bootle, Cumbria; 54.2834°N 3.3728°W		1890	Restoration, including heightening walls, adding an organ chamber and vestry, reseating, reroofing, and flooring the church, and completing the tower.	II
Holy Trinity Church	Colton, Cumbria; 54.2655°N 3.0479°W		1890	Restoration.	II
St Alkelda's Church	Giggleswick, North Yorkshire; 54.0723°N 2.2896°W		1890–91	Restoration, which included replacing the roof, removing the gallery, and reseating and reflooring the church.	I
St John the Evangelist's Church	Crawshawbooth, Rawtenstall, Lancashire; 53.7226°N 2.2892°W		1890–92	New church in Perpendicular style.	II*
St John the Baptist's Church	Atherton, Greater Manchester; 53.5239°N 2.4902°W		1890–96	Completed a church built in 1878–79 by Paley and Austin with two more bays at the west end, and a southwest tower.	II
St Michael's Church	Bowness-on-Solway, Cumbria; 54.9524°N 3.2135°W		1891	Added north transept.	II*
Mission Church	Dale Street, Lancaster, Lancashire	—	1891	New mission church for Christ Church to accommodate 300 people at an estimated cost of £1,165.	—
St Wilfrid's Church	Melling, Lancashire; 54.1347°N 2.6165°W		1891	Restoration, including reseating.	I
St Paul's Church	Scotforth, Lancaster, Lancashire; 54.0336°N 2.7955°W		1891	Expansion of the west end by three bays and addition of transepts.	II
All Saints' Church	Sutton, St Helens, Merseyside; 53.4373°N 2.7033°W		1891–93	A new church.	II
Christ Church	Waterloo, Merseyside; 53.4709°N 3.0237°W		1891–99	New church in Perpendicular style.	II*
Lancaster Priory	Lancaster, Lancashire; 54.0507°N 2.8057°W		1892	Restoration of the east window.	I
St Gregory's Church	Preston Patrick, Cumbria; 54.2452°N 2.7119°W		1892	Now St Patrick's Church. Chancel replaced.	II
St Oswald's Church	Warton, Lancaster, Lancashire; 54.1442°N 2.7694°W		1892	Restoration.	II
St Bartholomew's Church	Barbon, Cumbria; 54.2365°N 2.5684°W		1892–93	New church in Perpendicular style.	II*
St Peter's Church	Field Broughton, Cumbria; 54.2280°N 2.9419°W		1892–94	New church in Perpendicular style.	II*
St Matthew's Church	Highfield, Wigan, Greater Manchester; 53.5292°N 2.6725°W		1892–94	New church in Early English style. Enlarged in 1910 and reredos added in 1917.	II*
St John's Church	St John's in the Vale, Cumbria; 54.5925°N 3.0748°W		1893	Reordering of the interior.	II
Keswick School of Industrial Art	Keswick, Cumbria	—	1893–94	A school for the promotion of the principles of the Arts and Crafts movement for Canon Hardwicke Rawnsley. It closed in 1984.	—
Christ Church	Wesham, Lancashire; 53.7902°N 2.8855°W		1893–94	West end of a new church.	II
All Saints' Church	Hertford, Hertfordshire; 51.7950°N 0.0757°W		1893–95	New church in Perpendicular style, replacing an earlier church destroyed in a fire.	II*
Royal Lancaster Infirmary (original building)	Lancaster, Lancashire; 54.0441°N 2.7993°W	—	1893–96	A new building in 17th-century style with a tall octagonal tower and a dome.	II
St George's Church	Heaviley, Stockport, Greater Manchester; 53.3972°N 2.1518°W		1893–97	New church.	I
Bury Parish Church	Bury, Greater Manchester; 53.5940°N 2.2971°W		1894	Added new seats to the chancel.	I
Hoarstones	Fence, Lancashire	—	1894	Additions to the house.	—
Mission Church	Sunderland Point, Lancashire; 53.9970°N 2.8783°W		1894	A small church in red brick measuring 41 feet (12 m) by 17 feet (5 m), with a capacity of about 150, and costing about £250.	II
St Luke's Church	Farnworth, Widnes, Cheshire; 53.3844°N 2.7273°W		1894–95	Restoration involving removal of galleries, box pews and a three-decker pulpit, stripping the plaster, adding vestries to the north and more seating, and reflooring the church.	II*
St Mary Magdalene's Church	Alsager, Cheshire; 53.0961°N 2.3071°W	—	1894–96	New church in Decorated style. Only one bay of the north aisle was built.	II
St Mary's Church	Borwick, Lancashire; 54.1544°N 2.7216°W		1894–96	New church.	II
St John the Evangelist's Church	Cheetham, Greater Manchester; 53.5051°N 2.2426°W		1895	Restoration.	II*
St George's Church	Unsworth, Bury, Greater Manchester; 53.5630°N 2.2719°W		Undated	Additional work.	—
