= Listed buildings in Cantsfield =

Cantsfield is a civil parish in Lancaster, Lancashire, England. It contains 16 listed buildings that are recorded in the National Heritage List for England. Of these, one is listed Grade II*, the middle grade, and the others are at Grade II, the lowest grade. The major building in the parish is Thurland Castle; this building and structures associated with it are listed. The parish contains the village of Cantsfield and is otherwise rural. The other listed buildings include houses in the village, a bridge, two milestones, and two boundary stones.

== Key ==
Grade	Criteria
II*	Particularly important buildings of more than special interest
II	Buildings of national importance and special interest

== Buildings ==
Name and location	Photograph	Date	Notes	Grade
Thurland Castle; 54.15203°N 2.59737°W		14th century	The castle was badly damaged in the Civil War, restored in 1809 and 1829, gutted by fire in 1879, and largely rebuilt using the original material by Paley and Austin. It is built in sandstone with slate roofs and consists mainly of two ranges at an acute angle. Features include two towers with embattled parapets, a single-storey embattled porch, and windows that are mullioned or mullioned and transomed. The building has been converted into flats.	II*
Cantsfield Hall; 54.14994°N 2.58251°W		1623	A stone house with a slate roof in two ranges at right angles to each other, in two storeys with attics. Originally the windows were mullioned, and some mullions have survived; other windows are modern replacements. Inside the house is a fireplace with a lintel carved with a coat of arms, and timber-framed partitions.	II
Cantsfield House; 54.15039°N 2.58350°W	—	1725	A stuccoed house with sandstone dressings and a slate roof. It has two storeys and a five-bay front. Above the central doorway is a plaque inscribed with initials and the date. The windows are sashes. On the right side is a set-back wing containing a doorway with an inscribed battlemented lintel, and at the rear is a wing with mullioned windows.	II
Abbotson Farmhouse; 54.15126°N 2.58129°W	—	Mid 18th century (probable)	The farmhouse is in sandstone with a slate roof. It has two storeys and three bays. The central doorway has a plain stone surround, and the windows are mullioned.	II
Rose Cottage; 54.15022°N 2.58346°W	—	Mid 18th century	A sandstone house with a slate roof. It has two storeys, and the main part is in two bays. The central doorway has a stone surround with moulded imposts, and the windows were originally mullioned. To the left are two bays containing sash windows.	II
Greta Bridge; 54.14829°N 2.59720°W	—	Early 19th century (probable)	The bridge carries the A683 road over the River Greta. It consists of a single segmental arch in rusticated sandstone, and has a solid parapet with rounded coping.	II
Milestone; 54.15032°N 2.58205°W	—	Mid 19th century	The milestone is in sandstone, and stands on the south side of the A687 road in the village of Cantsfield. It has a triangular plan and a sloping top inscribed with the name of the parish. On the sides are the distances in miles to Hornby, Lancaster, and Ingleton.	II
Milestone; 54.14716°N 2.55856°W	—	Mid 19th century	The milestone is in sandstone, and stands on the south side of the A687 road to the east of the village of Cantsfield. It has a triangular plan and a sloping top inscribed with the name of the parish. On the sides are the distances in miles to Hornby, Lancaster, and Ingleton.	II
Boundary stone 54.15389°N 2.60259°W	—	19th century	The stone marks the boundary with Tunstall. It is in sandstone and has a triangular plan. The faces are inscribed with the names of the parishes.	II
Boundary stone 54.14710°N 2.55814°W	—	19th century	The stone marks the boundary between Lancashire and the West Riding of Yorkshire, and stands on the south side of the A687 road. It consists of an upright flag with a rounded top, with inscriptions including the names of the counties.	II
Sundial, Thurland Castle; 54.15168°N 2.59770°W	—	1860	The sundial is on the terrace to the south of the castle. It is in sandstone, and has an octagonal base on three steps. The shaft is also octagonal and has fluted sides and a moulded cap, on which is an inscribed brass plate and gnomon.	II
Bridge and gateway, Thurland Castle; 54.15157°N 2.59806°W		1880s	The bridge and gateway are in sandstone, and were designed by Paley and Austin. The bridge crosses the moat, and consists of a single segmental arch with embattled parapets terminating at the south end in octagonal piers, and at the north end against the buttresses to the gateway. The gateway has a moulded pointed arch, above which is a shield of arms.	II
Stable court buildings and wall, Thurland Castle; 54.15204°N 2.59827°W	—	1880s	The wall and outbuildings are in sandstone. The buildings are in a single storey and contain mullioned windows. The wall on the west perimeter of the castle is buttressed, and contains a moulded pointed arch.	II
Terrace wall, Thurland Castle; 54.15224°N 2.59733°W	—	1880s	The terrace retaining wall has a battlemented parapet, it is buttressed, and the ends are rounded as bastions. The north end connects to the house; the south end connects to the gatehouse and contains two moulded doorways.	II
Inner courtyard wall and tower base, Thurland Castle; 54.15195°N 2.59794°W	—	1880s	The retaining wall of the inner courtyard is in sandstone. At the north end is a doorway and a flight of steps, and the south it ends in an octagonal pier. On the outside is the rectangular base of a tower probably dating from the 14th century.	II
Lodge, Thurland Castle; 54.15119°N 2.60212°W	—	1880s (probable)	The lodge, designed by Paley and Austin, is in two storeys. The west face has a gabled left wing, and a loggia with a gabled dormer. On the south side is a single-storey bay window. The other windows are mullioned.	II
