= Church of St James the Less, Tatham =

Church in Lancashire, England

Coordinates: 54.1191°N 2.6045°W

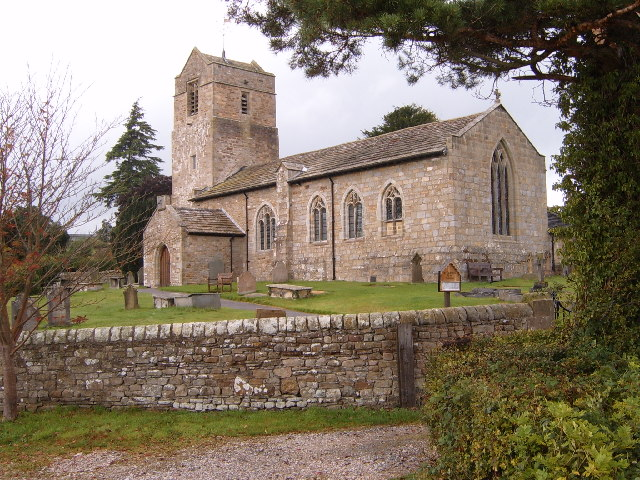
- Church of St James the Less, Tatham, from the southeast

- Location in the City of Lancaster district
- OS grid reference: SD 606694
- Location: Tatham, Lancashire
- Country: England
- Denomination: Anglican
- Website: St James the Less, Tatham

History
- Status: Parish church
- Dedication: Saint James the Less

Architecture
- Functional status: Active
- Heritage designation: Grade II*
- Designated: 4 October 1967
- Architect: Paley and Austin (restoration)
- Architectural type: Church
- Style: Norman, Gothic

Specifications
- Materials: Sandstone, stone slate roof

Administration
- Province: Province of York
- Diocese: Blackburn
- Archdeaconry: Lancaster
- Deanery: Tunstall
- Parish: Wray

The Church of St James the Less is in the village of Tatham, Lancashire, England. It is an active Anglican parish church in the deanery of Tunstall, the archdeaconry of Lancaster and the diocese of Blackburn. Its benefice is united with those of St Wilfrid, Melling, St John the Baptist, Tunstall, St Peter, Leck, the Good Shepherd, Lowgill, and Holy Trinity, Wray, to form the benefice of East Lonsdale. The church is recorded in the National Heritage List for England as a designated Grade II* listed building. It stands above the flood plain of the River Wenning.

== History ==
A church has been present on the site since at least the Norman era. Most of the fabric of the present church dates from the 15th century, with elements remaining from the Norman period and from the 13th century. The tower was rebuilt in 1722. In 1885–87 the Lancaster architects Paley and Austin added a saddleback roof to the tower. They also carried out an extensive restoration that included adding an organ loft and a vestry, repairing walls, adding windows, fittings and a floor, and removing the ceiling. The restoration cost £3,269 (equivalent to £370,000 in 2025).

== Architecture ==
=== Exterior ===
St James' is constructed in sandstone rubble, and has a stone slate roof. Its plan consists of a nave, a north aisle, a south porch, a chancel, a northeast vestry and organ chamber, and a west tower. The tower stands on a plinth, and has two setbacks. At its summit is a saddleback roof with gables to the north and south. Along the south wall of the church is one three-light window and three two-light windows, all containing Perpendicular tracery, and a buttress. The outer doorway of the porch has a pointed arch, above which is a slate sundial. The inner doorway is Norman, and has been much restored. On the north wall of the aisle are two windows, one with two lights, the other with three lights, both with trefoils under flat heads. Between them is a doorway with a pointed arch. The organ chamber is gabled and contains a three-light window with Perpendicular tracery. The vestry has a two-light window with Y-tracery. The east window has three lights with intersecting tracery.

=== Interior ===
Inside the church between the nave and the aisle is a three-bay arcade. It consists of pointed arches carried on octagonal piers, with bases and capitals said to date from the 12th century. In the floor of the chancel is a medieval grave-cover. Also in the chancel are a triple sedilia and a piscina with trefoil heads; both of these have been restored and reconstructed. The sandstone font is octagonal and carved. The choirstalls, pews and pulpit were designed by Paley and Austin. The stained glass in the east window is by Burlison and Grylls and dates from the late 19th century. The window also incorporates glass depicting the arms of the Duke of Lancaster in grisaille, dating from about 1300 to about 1400. The west window in the aisle contains glass by Shrigley and Hunt, dated 1909, depicting Saint Helen. In the church are brasses dating from the 17th century. Also in the church are the painted royal arms of George II. The two-manual organ was built in the 1880s by Abbott. There is a ring of three bells. The oldest of these was cast in 1771 by an unknown founder, and the other two in 1887 by John Taylor and Company.

== External features ==
The churchyard contains the war grave of a sailor of the Royal Naval Patrol Service of World War II.

== See also ==
- Grade II* listed buildings in Lancashire
- Listed buildings in Tatham, Lancashire
- List of works by Paley, Austin and Paley
