= St John the Baptist's Church, Tunstall =

Coordinates: 54.1597°N 2.5923°W

St John the Baptist Church, Tunstall
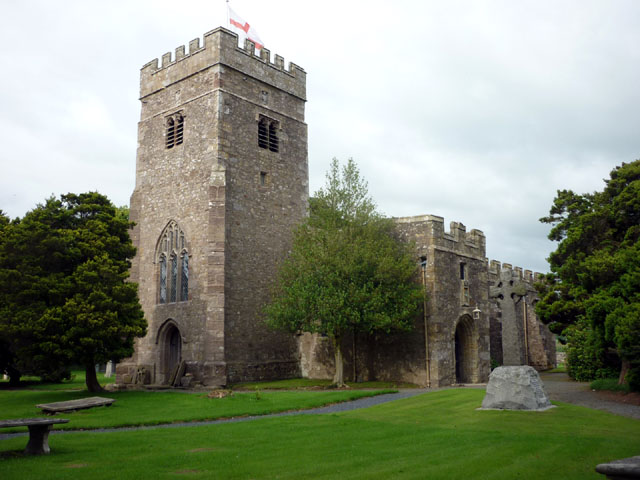
- St John the Baptist Church, Tunstall, from the southwest

- Location in the City of Lancaster district
- OS grid reference: SD 614,739
- Location: Tunstall, Lancashire
- Country: England
- Denomination: Anglican
- Website: St John the Baptist, Tunstall

History
- Status: Parish church
- Dedication: John the Baptist

Architecture
- Functional status: Active
- Heritage designation: Grade I
- Designated: 4 October 1967
- Architect: Austin and Paley (restoration)
- Architectural type: Church
- Style: Gothic

Specifications
- Capacity: 250
- Materials: Sandstone rubble, slate roof

Administration
- Province: York
- Diocese: Blackburn
- Archdeaconry: Lancaster
- Deanery: Tunstall
- Parish: Tunstall, St John the Baptist, Melling, St Wilfrid, and Leck, St Peter

Clergy
- Vicar: The Revd Mark Cannon

St John the Baptist Church is located to the northeast of the village of Tunstall, Lancashire, England. It is an active Anglican parish church in the united benefice of East Lonsdale, in the deanery of Tunstall, the archdeaconry of Lancaster and the diocese of Blackburn. The benefice of East Lonsdale combines this church with St Peter, Leck, St Wilfrid, Melling, St James the Less, Tatham, The Good Shepherd, Lowgill, and Holy Trinity, Wray. The church is recorded in the National Heritage List for England as a designated Grade I listed building. Services are usually at 11:00 on 2nd & 4th Sundays, in rota with the sister church at Leck.

== History ==
A church at Tunstall is recorded in the Domesday Book of 1086, but the oldest structure in the present church dates from the 13th century. The church was rebuilt around 1415 by Sir Thomas Tunstal. Alterations were made to the church in the 16th century. In the 1820s it was attended by the Brontë sisters during the time they were receiving education at the Clergy Daughters' School at nearby Cowan Bridge. In 1907 the church was restored by the Lancaster architects Austin and Paley; this included re-roofing the church, enlarging the organ chamber, and adding a vestry, at a cost of about £1,000 (equivalent to £100,000 in 2025).

== Architecture ==
=== Exterior ===
The church is built in sandstone rubble with a slate roof. Its plan consists of a west tower, a nave and chancel under a continuous roof, north and south aisles, and a two-storey south porch. The tower has diagonal buttresses and an embattled parapet. Above each of the small bell openings is a carved tablet of an angel holding a shield. The west door has a pointed head above which is a three-light window with Perpendicular tracery. The aisles have embattled parapets, as does the porch. Above the door of the porch is a niche with a sundial plate and above that a small one-light window.

=== Interior ===
Internally the responds of the north arcade have early 13th-century capitals and the west lancet windows of the north aisle are probably also from this century. Dating from the 1907 restoration are the roof, and the chancel screen. A Roman votive stone, thought to be linked to Over Burrow Roman Fort, has been built into the surround of a window in the north aisle. At the east end of the south aisle is a chapel known as the Chapel of the Holy Trinity. In the chapel is a mutilated effigy which is said to be of Sir Thomas Tunstal. Under the tower arch is an 18th-century oval marble font on sandstone baluster base. The east window contains glass from the Netherlands dating from the late 15th and the 16th centuries. It was donated to the church in 1810 by Richard Toulmin North of nearby Thurland Castle. In the south wall is stained glass dated 1979 by Jane Gray. In the church are a number of memorials to the Fenwick family. The two-manual organ was built in 1923 by Harrison and Harrison.

The church also owns a 16th-century painting by Francesco Montemezzano. It was probably donated to the church in the early 19th century by Frederick Needham (the church's vicar from 1810 to 1816), who was a half-brother of the church's patron, Richard Toulmin North of Thurland Castle. The painting was removed for restoration in connection with a BBC television programme discussed below. The painting is now back in the church and can be visited any time the church is open.

== External features ==
Near the church there is a sandstone sundial base dating probably from the 18th century consisting of a round column with a square cap on a base of three octagonal steps. It is listed at Grade II. The churchyard also contains the war graves of four service personnel of World War II.

== In media ==
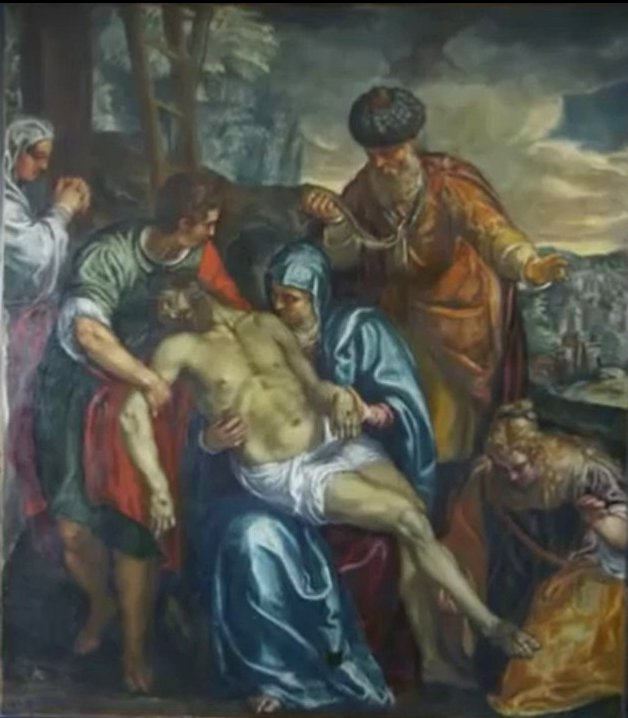
The painting by Montemezzano

The church was featured in an episode of the BBC One television series Fake or Fortune? that aired on 19 July 2015 (Series 4, Episode 3). The identity of the artist who created the church's 16th-century painting of the Lamentation of Christ had been a mystery, but an investigation of the painting and its history revealed that it was a work by Venetian artist Francesco Montemezzano. The painting is believed to have left Venice after the fall of the Venetian Republic in 1797, when systematic looting of art took place.

== See also ==
- Grade I listed buildings in Lancashire
- Grade I listed churches in Lancashire
- Listed buildings in Tunstall, Lancashire
