= Diocese of Blackburn =

Diocese of the Church of England

Coordinates: 53.750°N 2.485°W

Diocese of Blackburn Dioecesis Blackburnensis
- Coat of arms

- Flag

Location
- Ecclesiastical province: York
- Archdeaconries: Blackburn, Lancaster

Statistics
- Parishes: 211
- Churches: 280

Information
- Cathedral: Blackburn Cathedral
- Language: English

Current leadership
- Bishop: Philip North, Bishop of Blackburn
- Suffragans: Jill Duff, Bishop of Lancaster; Joe Kennedy, Bishop of Burnley
- Archdeacons: David Picken, Archdeacon of Lancaster; Jane Atkinson, Archdeacon-designate of Blackburn

Website
- blackburn.anglican.org

The diocese of Blackburn is diocese of the Church of England in North West England. Its boundaries correspond to northern Lancashire. The diocese contains 211 parishes and 280 churches. Blackburn Cathedral is the seat of the bishop of Blackburn, currently Philip North, and the diocesan offices are also located in Blackburn.

What is now the diocese of Blackburn was historically part of the diocese of York. It became part of the newly created diocese of Chester in 1541, and part of the diocese of Manchester when it was created in 1847. The diocese of Blackburn was in turn established on 12 November 1926 from the northern part of Manchester.

== Bishops ==
Alongside the diocesan Bishop of Blackburn (Philip North), the diocese has two suffragan bishops: Jill Duff, Bishop suffragan of Lancaster, consecrated in 2018; and Joe Kennedy, Bishop suffragan of Burnley, consecrated 2024.

- Since 1994, Michael Vickers, retired area Bishop of Colchester, has been licensed to serve as an honorary assistant bishop in the diocese. He lives in Scotforth, Lancaster.
- Cyril Ashton, a retired former Bishop suffragan of Doncaster has been licensed since his 2011 retirement to Lancaster.
- Retired former archbishop of York David Hope lives in Hellifield, N. Yorks (in the neighbouring Diocese of Leeds) and is licensed as an honorary assistant bishop in Blackburn diocese.

There is no alternative episcopal oversight (for parishes in the diocese which reject the ministry of priests who are women) in the diocese because the ordinary (Philip North) does not ordain women as priests.

== Archdeaconries and deaneries ==
Diocese	Archdeaconries	Rural Deaneries
Diocese of Blackburn	Archdeaconry of Blackburn	Deanery of Accrington
Diocese of Blackburn	Archdeaconry of Blackburn	Deanery of Blackburn and Darwen
Diocese of Blackburn	Archdeaconry of Blackburn	Deanery of Burnley
Diocese of Blackburn	Archdeaconry of Blackburn	Deanery of Chorley
Diocese of Blackburn	Archdeaconry of Blackburn	Deanery of Leyland
Diocese of Blackburn	Archdeaconry of Blackburn	Deanery of Pendle
Diocese of Blackburn	Archdeaconry of Blackburn	Deanery of Whalley
Diocese of Blackburn	Archdeaconry of Lancaster	Deanery of Blackpool
Diocese of Blackburn	Archdeaconry of Lancaster	Deanery of Garstang
Diocese of Blackburn	Archdeaconry of Lancaster	Deanery of Kirkham
Diocese of Blackburn	Archdeaconry of Lancaster	Deanery of Lancaster and Morecambe
Diocese of Blackburn	Archdeaconry of Lancaster	Deanery of Poulton
Diocese of Blackburn	Archdeaconry of Lancaster	Deanery of Preston
Diocese of Blackburn	Archdeaconry of Lancaster	Deanery of Tunstall

== Churches within the diocese ==
=== Deanery of Accrington ===
Area Dean: the Revd Canon David Arnold

- Christ Church, Accrington
- St Andrew, Accrington
- St Mary Magdalen, Accrington
- St Peter, Accrington
- St James, Accrington
- St Paul, Accrington
- St John the Evangelist, Accrington
- St James, Altham
- St John the Baptist, Baxenden
- All Saints, Clayton-le-Moors
- St Clement, Green Haworth
- St James, Haslingden
- St Augustine, Huncoat
- St Peter, Laneside, Haslingden
- St Thomas, Musbury, Haslingden
- All Saints, Oswaldtwistle
- Immanuel, Oswaldtwistle
- St Paul, Oswaldtwistle

=== Deanery of Blackburn and Darwen ===
Area Dean: the Revd Rebecca Roberts

- Blackburn Cathedral
- Christ Church, Blackburn
- Holy Trinity, Blackburn
- St Aidan, Mill Hill, Blackburn
- St Andrew, Livesey, Blackburn
- St Barnabas, Blackburn
- St Bartholomew, Ewood, Blackburn
- St Francis, Feniscliffe, Blackburn
- St Gabriel, Brownhill Drive, Blackburn
- St James, Blackburn
- St Jude, Blackburn
- St Luke, Blackburn
- St Michael & All Angels, Blackburn
- St Silas, Blackburn
- St Stephen, Blackburn
- Church of the Saviour, Blackburn
- St Barnabas, Darwen
- St Cuthbert, Darwen
- St Mary, Grimehills, Darwen
- St Peter, Darwen
- Immanuel, Feniscowles
- St Paul, Hoddlesden
- St Oswald, Knuzden
- St James, Lower Darwen
- St James, Over Darwen
- St Stephen, Tockholes

=== Deanery of Burnley ===
Area Dean: the Revd Munawar Din

- St James, Briercliffe
- All Saints, Habergham, Burnley
- St Andrew, Burnley
- St Catherine, Burnley
- St Cuthbert, Burnley
- St Mark, Burnley
- St Matthew the Apostle, Habergham Eaves, Burnley
- St Peter, Burnley
- St Stephen, Burnley
- Wellfield Mission, Burnley
- St Margaret, Hapton
- St John the Divine, Holme-in-Cliviger
- St Leonard, Padiham
- St John the Evangelist, Worsthorne

=== Deanery of Chorley ===
Area Dean: the Revd Neil Kelley

- St Paul, Adlington
- All Saints, Appley Bridge
- St John the Baptist, Bretherton
- St James, Brindle
- Christ Church, Charnock Richard
- All Saints, Chorley
- St George, Chorley
- St James, Chorley
- St Laurence, Chorley
- St Peter, Chorley
- Clayton Brook Community Church
- Coppull Parish Church
- St John the Divine, Coppull
- St Michael & All Angels, Croston
- St Mary the Virgin, Eccleston
- Euxton Parish Church
- St Barnabas, Heapey
- St Peter, Mawdesley
- Christ Church, Parbold
- St Anne, Shevington
- St Wilfrid, Standish
- St John the Evangelist, Whittle-le-Woods
- St Paul, Withnell
- St James the Great, Wrightington

=== Deanery of Leyland ===
Area Dean: the Revd Marc Wolverson

- St Aidan, Bamber Bridge
- Buckshaw Village Church (ecumenical)
- St Saviour, Cuerden
- St Paul, Farington Moss
- All Saints, Hesketh
- All Saints, Higher Walton
- Holy Trinity, Hoghton
- St Michael & All Angels, Hoole
- St Ambrose, Leyland
- St Andrew, Leyland
- St James, Leyland
- St John, Leyland
- St Andrew, Longton
- All Saints, New Longton
- St James, Lostock Hall
- St Leonard, Penwortham
- St Mary, Penwortham
- St Mary the Virgin, Rufford
- Holy Trinity, Tarleton
- St Leonard, Walton-le-Dale

=== Deanery of Pendle ===
Area Dean: the Revd Lesley Hinchcliffe

- St Thomas, Barrowford
- St Luke the Evangelist, Brierfield
- St Bartholomew, Colne
- Christ Church, Colne
- Holy Trinity, Colne
- St Anne, Fence-in-Pendle
- St Michael & All Angels, Foulridge
- St John the Evangelist, Higham
- St Mary, Nelson
- St John the Evangelist, Great Marsden, Nelson
- St Paul, Little Marsden, Nelson
- St Mary, Newchurch in Pendle
- St Mary the Virgin, Trawden

=== Deanery of Whalley ===
Area Dean: the Revd Jonathan Carmylie

- St Leonard, Balderstone
- SS Peter & Paul, Bolton-by-Bowland
- Christ Church, Chatburn
- St Bartholomew, Chipping
- St James, Clitheroe
- St Mary Magdalene, Clitheroe
- St Paul, Low Moor, Clitheroe
- St Leonard, Downham
- St George, Dunsop Bridge
- St Mary the Virgin, Gisburn
- St Bartholomew, Great Harwood
- All Hallows, Great Mitton
- St Ambrose, Grindleton
- St Nicholas, Heyhouses
- St John the Evangelist, Hurst Green
- St Leonard, Langho
- St Mary, Mellor
- All Saints, Pendleton
- St John the Evangelist, Read
- St Wilfrid, Ribchester
- SS Peter & Paul, Rishton
- St Peter, Salesbury
- St Leonard the Less, Samlesbury
- St Peter, Simonstone
- St Andrew, Slaidburn
- St Saviour, Stydd
- St Bartholomew, Tosside
- St Helen, Waddington
- St Catherine, West Bradford
- St Mary & All Saints, Whalley
- St Michael, Whitewell

=== Deanery of Blackpool ===
Area Dean: the Revd Peter Lillicrap

- All Saints, Anchorsholme
- All Hallows, Bispham
- Christ Church with All Saints (Beacon Church), Blackpool
- Holy Cross, South Shore, Blackpool
- Holy Trinity, South Shore, Blackpool
- St Christopher, Hawes Side, Blackpool
- St John, Blackpool
- St Mark, Layton, Blackpool
- St Mary, South Shore, Blackpool
- St Paul, Marton, Blackpool
- St Paul, North Shore, Blackpool
- St Peter, South Shore, Blackpool
- St Stephen-on-the-Cliffs, Blackpool
- St Thomas, Blackpool
- St Wilfrid (Freedom Church), Mereside, Blackpool
- St Anne, Greenlands
- St Luke's Mission Church, Staining

=== Deanery of Garstang ===
Area Dean: the Revd Andrew Wilkinson

- All Saints, Barnacre
- St Lawrence, Barton
- St Hilda, Bilsborrow
- St Eadmor, Bleasdale
- Calder Vale Mission Church
- St John the Evangelist, Calder Vale
- St Helen, Churchtown
- St Anne, Copp
- St Mark, Eagland Hill
- St Thomas, Garstang
- St Mary the Virgin, Goosnargh
- Blessed Virgin Mary, Hambleton
- St Peter, Inskip
- St John the Evangelist, Out Rawcliffe
- St John the Baptist, Pilling
- St Oswald, Preesall
- St Michael, St Michael's on Wyre
- St Peter, Scorton
- St James, Stalmine
- St James, Whitechapel
- St Anne, Woodplumpton

=== Deanery of Kirkham ===
Area Dean: the Revd Anne Beverley

- St Matthew, Ballam
- St John the Evangelist, Clifton
- Holy Trinity, Freckleton
- St Michael, Kirkham
- St Cuthbert, Lytham
- St John the Divine, Lytham
- St Anne, Lytham St Annes
- St Margaret of Antioch, Lytham St Annes
- St Paul, Ansdell & Fairhaven, Lytham St Annes
- St Thomas, Lytham St Annes
- Christ Church, Treales
- St Paul, Warton
- St Michael, Weeton
- Christ Church, Wesham
- St Nicholas, Wrea Green

=== Deanery of Lancaster and Morecambe ===
Area Dean: vacant

- St Michael & All Angels, Cockerham
- St Mark, Dolphinholme
- St John the Evangelist, Ellel
- St James, Forton
- Christ Church, Glasson
- St James, Heysham
- St Peter, Heysham
- Christ Church, Lancaster
- St Chad, Skerton, Lancaster
- St George, Marsh, Lancaster
- St Luke, Skerton, Lancaster
- St Mary the Virgin, Lancaster (Lancaster Priory)
- St Thomas, Lancaster
- Ascension, Torrisholme, Morecambe
- Holy Trinity, Morecambe
- St Barnabas, Morecambe
- St Christopher, Bare, Morecambe
- St John the Divine, Sandylands, Morecambe
- St Martin of Tours, Westgate, Morecambe
- Christ Church, Over Wyresdale
- St Helen, Overton
- St Peter, Quernmore
- St Paul, Scotforth
- Sunderland Point Mission Church
- St Luke, Winmarleigh

=== Deanery of Poulton ===
Area Dean: the Revd Damian Platt

- St Andrew, Cleveleys
- St Nicholas, Fleetwood
- St Peter, Fleetwood
- St John the Evangelist, Little Thornton
- St Chad's Church, Poulton-le-Fylde
- St Hilda of Whitby, Poulton-le-Fylde
- St Anne, Singleton
- Christ Church, Thornton-le-Fylde

=== Deanery of Preston ===
Area Dean: the Revd David Hanson

- St John the Baptist's Church, Broughton
- St Michael, Grimsargh
- St Lawrence, Longridge
- St Paul, Longridge
- All Saints, Preston
- Ascension, Ribbleton, Preston
- Christ Church, Fulwood, Preston
- Christ the King Chapel, Preston
- Emmanuel, Preston
- St Andrew, Ashton-on-Ribble, Preston
- St Christopher, Lea, Preston
- St Cuthbert, Preston
- St George, Preston
- St James, Preston
- Minster of St John the Evangelist, Preston
- St Margaret, Ingol, Preston
- St Martin, Fulwood, Preston
- St Mary Magdalene, Ribbleton, Preston
- St Matthew, Preston
- St Michael & All Angels, Ashton-on-Ribble, Preston
- St Peter, Fulwood, Preston
- St Stephen, Preston

=== Deanery of Tunstall ===
Area Dean: vacant

- St John the Baptist, Arkholme
- St Saviour, Aughton
- Holy Trinity, Bolton-le-Sands
- St Mary, Borwick
- St Paul, Brookhouse
- Christ Church, Carnforth
- St John the Evangelist, Gressingham
- St Wilfrid, Halton
- St Margaret, Hornby
- St Peter, Leck
- St Wilfrid, Melling
- St Mark, Nether Kellet
- St Cuthbert, Over Kellet
- St John, Silverdale
- St Luke, Slyne
- St James the Less, Tatham
- Good Shepherd, Tatham Fells
- St John the Baptist, Tunstal
- St Oswald, Warton
- St Michael the Archangel, Whittington
- Holy Trinity, Wray
- St John the Evangelist, Yealand Conyers

== Disused churches ==
This list is not exhaustive.

- St Mark's, Blackburn
- St John's, Great Harwood
