= Cantsfield =

Hamlet and civil parish in Lancashire, England

Coordinates: 54.150°N 2.582°W

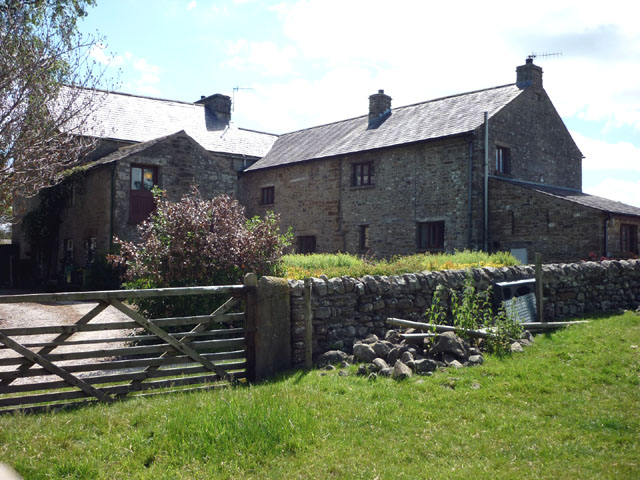
- Cantsfield Hall

- Location in the City of Lancaster district Location within Lancashire
- Population: 76 (2001)
- OS grid reference: SD619729
- Civil parish: Cantsfield
- District: City of Lancaster
- Shire county: Lancashire
- Region: North West
- Country: England
- Sovereign state: United Kingdom
- Post town: CARNFORTH
- Postcode district: LA6
- Dialling code: 01524
- Police: Lancashire
- Fire: Lancashire
- Ambulance: North West
- UK Parliament: Morecambe and Lunesdale

Cantsfield is a hamlet and civil parish in the City of Lancaster, in Lancashire, England, near the boundary with North Yorkshire. It is situated near the River Greta and on the A687 road near the junction with the A683. The parish had a population of 76 according to the 2001 census. In the 2011 census the parish was included with Tunstall. The village is a designated conservation area.

Thurland Castle, situated between Cantsfield and Tunstall, was originally built in the 14th century, and after being damaged during the English Civil War and rebuilt on two occasions, has now been converted into apartments.

== See also ==
- Listed buildings in Cantsfield
