= Church of the Good Shepherd, Tatham =

Coordinates: 54.0831°N 2.5303°W

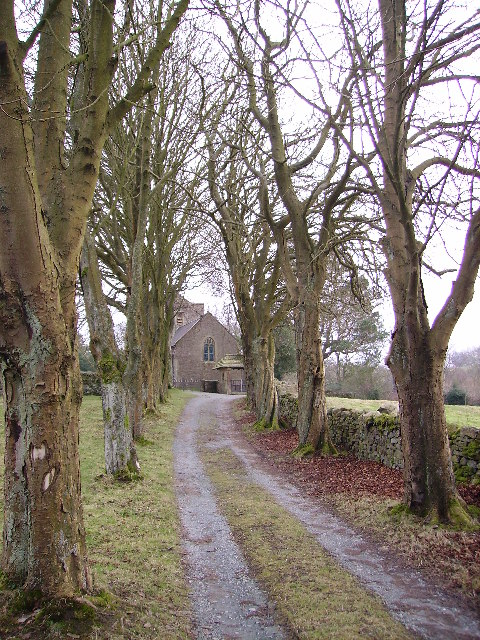

- Location in the City of Lancaster district
- OS grid reference: SD 654654
- Location: Tatham Fell, Lancashire
- Country: England
- Denomination: Anglican
- Churchmanship: Central
- Website: The Good Shepherd, Tatham Fells, Lowgill

History
- Status: Parish church
- Dedication: Good Shepherd

Architecture
- Functional status: Active
- Heritage designation: Grade II
- Designated: 24 February 1986
- Architect: Paley and Austin
- Architectural type: Church
- Style: Gothic Revival
- Completed: 1889
- Construction cost: £1,200

Specifications
- Materials: Sandstone, stone slate roof

Administration
- Province: York
- Diocese: Blackburn
- Archdeaconry: Lancaster
- Deanery: Tunstall

The Church of the Good Shepherd is on Tatham Fell in Lancashire, England. It is an active Anglican parish church in the deanery of Tunstall, the archdeaconry of Lancaster and the diocese of Blackburn. Its benefice is united with those of St Wilfrid, Melling, St John the Baptist, Tunstall, St Peter, Leck, St James, Tatham, and Holy Trinity, Wray, to form the benefice of East Lonsdale. The church is recorded in the National Heritage List for England as a designated Grade II listed building.

== History ==
A church has stood on the site since at least 1577, and possibly earlier. The present church was built in 1888–89 to replace a church dating from about 1840. It was designed by the Lancaster architects Paley, Austin and Paley. The new church provided seating for 140 people, and cost £1,200 (equivalent to £130,000 in 2025).

== Architecture ==
=== Exterior ===
The church is constructed in sandstone rubble, and has a stone slate roof. Its plan consists of a nave and a chancel, a central tower, a vestry on the north side of the tower, and a south porch. Other than the east window, all the windows have round heads. On the north side of the nave are two two-light windows and on the south side is one three-light window. The west window has two lights and contains Perpendicular tracery. On the south side of the chancel is one single-light window and one with two lights. The east window has a pointed head and four lights, with Perpendicular tracery. The tower has buttresses on its north and south walls. On its south side is a two-light window. The bell openings have a single light with a trefoil head, and are louvred. At the top of the tower is a pyramidal roof behind a coped parapet.

=== Interior ===
The lectern dates from the late 19th century, and incorporates 17th-century carving. The stained glass is by Shrigley and Hunt. The east window dates from about 1905 and depicts the Good Shepherd. The west window dates from 1909. The monuments include an oval slate slab from the older church dated 1795. Also in the church are the painted royal arms of George III, and Commandment and Creed boards dating from the late 18th century. The single-manual organ (without pedals) was made by Watson Lever and Company. It was restored in 1980 by R. D and E. H. Holmes.

== See also ==
- Listed buildings in Tatham, Lancashire
- List of works by Paley, Austin and Paley
