= Christ Church, Lancaster =

Coordinates: 54.0458°N 2.7883°W

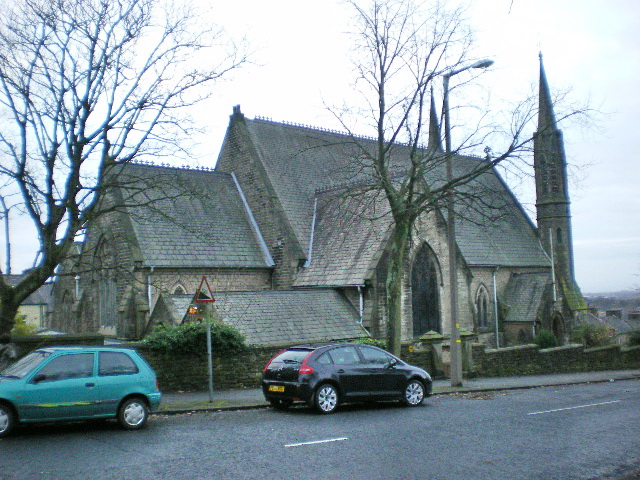
- Christ Church, Lancaster, from the northeast

- Location in Lancaster
- OS grid reference: SD 48483 61381
- Location: Wyresdale Road, Lancaster, Lancashire
- Country: England
- Denomination: Anglican
- Churchmanship: Liberal Anglo-Catholic
- Website: Christ Church, Lancaster

History
- Status: Parish church
- Founder: Samuel Gregson

Architecture
- Functional status: Active
- Heritage designation: Grade II
- Designated: 13 March 1995
- Architect(s): Henry Martin, Paley and Austin; Paley, Austin and Paley; Austin and Paley
- Architectural type: Church
- Style: Gothic Revival
- Groundbreaking: 1855
- Completed: 1889

Specifications
- Materials: Sandstone, slate roofs

Administration
- Province: York
- Diocese: Blackburn
- Archdeaconry: Lancaster
- Deanery: Lancaster and Morecambe
- Parish: Lancaster Christ Church

Clergy
- Vicar: Rev'd Carol Backhouse
- Priest: Rev'd Canon Brenda Harding

Christ Church is in Wyresdale Road, Lancaster, Lancashire, England. It is an active Anglican parish church in the deanery of Lancaster and Morecambe, the archdeaconry of Lancaster, and the diocese of Blackburn. The church is recorded in the National Heritage List for England as a designated Grade II listed building.

== History ==
Christ Church was built between 1855 and 1857 to a design by the London architect Henry Martin. It was built as a chapel for Lancaster Grammar School and the local workhouse. The church was paid for and endowed by Samuel Gregson, a local industrialist and MP. In 1889 a south aisle was added, designed by the local architects Paley and Austin. It provided 152 seats, and cost about £1,000. In 1894–95 a west baptistry was added by the same practice, then known as Paley, Austin and Paley. The same practice (by now Austin and Paley) converted the organ chamber into the Storey chapel, the organ having been moved into the south transept. In 1919 a war memorial was installed in the churchyard. It was in Derbyshire stone, 25 feet (8 m) high, and cost £400. This was designed by Henry Paley, then trading as Austin, Paley and Austin.

In 1899/1900 the church had a rugby league team, Christ Church Hornets which played in the Westmorland League. It isn't clear where they played, but match reports describe the ground as sloping.

== Architecture ==
=== Exterior ===
The church is constructed in squared coursed sandstone and has slate roofs. Its plan consists of a nave, a west baptistry, a north porch, a north transept, a north vestry, a chancel with a lower roof, a south aisle with a chapel, and a south porch. At the west end is a pair of turrets. Most of the windows in the church have pointed arches and contain Geometric tracery. The turrets have square bases that broach to octagons. The bell openings are gabled and above them are spirelets. At the west end of the nave is a five-light window containing Perpendicular tracery. Beneath the window and between the turrets is the baptistry. Springing from the baptistry are gargoyles. At the west end of the south aisle is a three-light window. The south aisle is in six bays separated by buttresses. Five of the bays contain two-light windows with trefoil heads. The sixth bay, probably the site of an earlier transept, contains a three-light window. On the north side of the church is a porch, with one bay to the west and three bays to the east, all with two-light windows. In the north transept, the north window has three lights, and the west window two lights. The north wall of the vestry contains a four-light mullioned window and a doorway; the east wall has two two-light windows. In the east wall of the chancel is a three-light window; the south aisle and chapel each have two-light windows, and in the south wall of the chapel are two two-light windows.

=== Interior ===
Between the nave and the south aisle is a four-bay arcade. The font, dating from 1914, is made from sandstone and marble. It has a wooden cover, carved as a Gothic spire. Over this is a wrought iron crane with an ornate arm. The reredos is in marble and dates from 1916. Some of the stained glass was made in the middle of the 19th century by Powell. Elsewhere there is a "magnificent scheme" of stained glass by Carl Almquist and E. H. Jewitt of Shrigley and Hunt, installed between 1892 and 1909, described in the Buildings of England series as "one of their best and most important ensembles". The three-manual organ was installed in 1857, and was rebuilt, enlarged and moved into the north transept in 1937 by Henry Ainscough of Preston.

== External features ==
To the north of the church is a sandstone war memorial dating from 1919. It has been designated as a Grade II listed building.

== See also ==
- Listed buildings in Lancaster, Lancashire
- List of ecclesiastical works by Paley and Austin
- List of works by Paley, Austin and Paley
- List of ecclesiastical works by Austin and Paley (1916–44)
