= St Paul's Church, Longridge =

Coordinates: 53.8313°N 2.6001°W

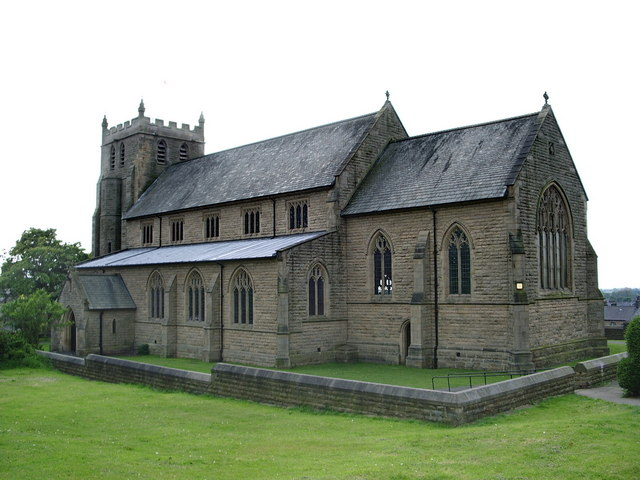
- St Paul's Church, Longridge, from the southeast

- Location in the Ribble Valley
- OS grid reference: SD 606 374
- Location: Off Berry Lane, Longridge, Lancashire
- Country: England
- Denomination: Anglican
- Website: St Paul, Longridge

History
- Status: Parish church
- Dedication: Saint Paul
- Consecrated: 1890

Architecture
- Functional status: Active
- Heritage designation: Grade II
- Designated: 22 November 1983
- Architect(s): Ewan Christian, A. C. M. Lillie
- Architectural type: Church
- Style: Gothic Revival
- Groundbreaking: 1886
- Completed: 1937

Specifications
- Materials: Sandstone, slate roof

Administration
- Province: York
- Diocese: Blackburn
- Archdeaconry: Lancaster
- Deanery: Preston
- Parish: Longridge

Clergy
- Vicar: Revd Mike Barton

St Paul's Church stands off Berry Lane, Longridge, Lancashire, England. It is an active Anglican parish church in the diocese of Blackburn. The church was built in 1886–1888, and the tower was added in 1936–37. The church is recorded in the National Heritage List for England as a designated Grade II listed building.

== History ==
St Paul's Church was built in 1886–1888, as a chapel of ease for the nearby parish church of St Lawrence, and designed by Ewan Christian. The foundation stone was laid by Lady Stanley in 1886, and the church was consecrated by the Bishop of Manchester in 1890. The tower, designed by A. C. M. Lillie, was added in 1936–37. Currently, the Parish of Longridge has two churches, with St Lawrence and St Paul acting, jointly, as parish church.

== Architecture ==
=== Exterior ===
The church is constructed in sandstone with slate roofs. Its plan consists of a five-bay nave with a clerestory, north and south aisles, a chancel, a north organ chamber and vestry, and a west tower. The tower has angle buttresses, and a west doorway with a moulded surround. Above the doorway is a three-light window, over which are three narrow lancet windows. There are two lancet bell openings on each face, and at the top of the tower is an embattled parapet with corner pinnacles. On the south face of the tower is an octagonal stair turret. The windows contain Perpendicular tracery.

=== Interior ===
Inside the church the arcades are carried on octagonal piers and have pointed arches. The chancel arch is moulded, and there is a tall west arch leading into the tower. Both the nave and chancel have open timber roofs. The stained glass in the east window is by Kempe and dates from before 1899. There is also a window depicting Saint George and the Dragon dating from the 1960s, possibly by Shrigley and Hunt. The three-manual pipe organ was built in 1894 by Henry Willis. It was later overhauled and altered by Laycock and Bannister, and in 2002 was restored by David Wells of Liverpool.

== Appraisal ==
The church was designated as a Grade II listed building on 22 November 1983. Grade II is the lowest of the three grades of listing, and is applied to buildings that "are of special interest". The architectural historians Hartwell and Pevsner comment in the Buildings in England series that the church is "rather squat", and that it is "all rather conventional".

== Present day ==
St Paul's is an active Anglican parish church in the deanery of Preston, the archdeaconry of Lancaster, and the diocese of Blackburn. The church works in association with St Lawrence's Church, it holds services on Sundays and Thursdays, and publishes a parish magazine.

== See also ==
- Listed buildings in Longridge
