= Listed buildings in Melling-with-Wrayton =

Melling-with-Wrayton is a civil parish in Lancaster, Lancashire, England. It contains 22 listed buildings that are recorded in the National Heritage List for England. Of these, one is listed at Grade I, the highest of the three grades, one is at Grade II*, the middle grade, and the others are at Grade II, the lowest grade. The parish contains the village of Melling and the hamlet of Wrayton, and is otherwise rural. Most of the listed buildings are houses, farmhouses and associated structures. The others include a church and associated structures, and two milestones.

== Key ==
Grade	Criteria
I	Buildings of exceptional interest, sometimes considered to be internationally important
II*	Particularly important buildings of more than special interest
II	Buildings of national importance and special interest

== Buildings ==
Name and location	Photograph	Date	Notes	Grade
St Wilfrid's Church; 54.13478°N 2.61668°W		15th century	The church contains some earlier fabric, and the tower dates from the late 15th century. The church was restored in 1763 when the clerestory was added, and again in 1891 by Paley, Austin and Paley. It is in sandstone with stone-slate roofs, and consists of a nave and chancel under one roof with a clerestory, aisles, a south porch, a south chapel and a west tower. The tower has a west doorway, diagonal buttresses, and an embattled parapet.	I
Wrayton Hall Farmhouse; 54.14477°N 2.59484°W	—	Mid 17th century (probable)	The farmhouse is in sandstone with a slate roof. It is in two storeys, and has an L-shaped plan with a main block of three bays and a wing of two bays. Most of the windows have retained their mullions. The doorway has a moulded surround, moulded imposts, and a shaped lintel with an illegible inscription.	II
Crowtrees Farmhouse and barn 54.13545°N 2.61620°W	—	Late 17th century	The farmhouse and adjoining barn are in sandstone. The house has a tiled roof, and is in a T-shaped plan, with two storeys and two bays. The windows are mullioned with modern glazing, and the central doorway has a plain surround. In the angle at the rear of the house is a porch above which is a re-set inscribed plaque. The barn to the left has a stone-slate roof, and openings including a wide entrance, pitching holes, and ventilation slits.	II
Old Crowtrees; 54.13538°N 2.61318°W	—	Late 17th century	A sandstone house with a stone-slate roof, with two storeys and three bays. The windows are mullioned, and in the centre is a doorway with a gabled porch. In the 20th century the house was extended in keeping with the addition of a bay and a cross-wing.	II
Vicarage; 54.13509°N 2.61578°W	—	Late 17th century	The vicarage is in sandstone with a stone-slate roof. It has two storeys and the main part is in three bays. Most of the windows have moulded surrounds and are sashes, There is a single storey gabled porch and a doorway with an architrave, a triangular pediment and an inscribed frieze. There is an extension to the left.	II
Old Malt House; 54.13313°N 2.61907°W	—	1684	A sandstone house with a slate roof in two storeys and with a symmetrical four-bay front. The windows are mullioned. The central doorway has a moulded surround, and above it is a stepped and inscribed lintel. There is a continuous hood mould over the windows and rising in steps above the lintel.	II*
Hodgson tomb 54.13478°N 2.61616°W	—	Early 18th century	The tomb chest is in the churchyard of St Wilfrid's Church. It is in sandstone with panels on the corners and north and south sides. On the west side is a carved hour glass, and on the east side is a skull and crossed bones. There is a carved inscription on the slab.	II
Melling Hall Hotel; 54.13561°N 2.61563°W	—	Early to mid 18th century	Originally a house, later used as a hotel, it has a central sandstone block in three storeys and three bays and with a modillioned cornice. There is a central porch with four Ionic columns, a fluted frieze, and a central patera. The central block is flanked by rendered two-storey wings, that on the left having two bays, and on the right are four bays. The windows are sashes.	II
Church Gates Cottage and barn 54.13474°N 2.61713°W	—	Mid 18th century	The house and adjoining barn are in sandstone with a slate roof. The house has two storeys and two bays. The windows are mullioned, and the central doorway has a timber porch. The barn to the right has a wide opening with a segmental arch. (Note: Street View in April 2009 shows that the barn has been converted for residential use.)	II
Todd's House; 54.13513°N 2.61684°W	—	Mid 18th century (probable)	A sandstone house with a stone-slate roof, in two storeys and two bays. The ground floor windows have mullions, and most of the windows are sashes. The central doorway has a plain surround, and above it is a re-set lintel inscribed with initial and a date.	II
Wrayton Old Hall; 54.14479°N 2.59649°W	—	Mid 18th century	The house is in pebbledashed stone with a slate roof, and is in two storeys and five bays. The windows have plain surrounds, and are mullioned and transomed. The doorway is in the second bay.	II
Sundial; 54.13459°N 2.61647°W	—	18th century (probable)	The sundial is in the churchyard of St Wilfrid's Church. It is in sandstone, and has a roughly square base and a tapering rectangular shaft. On the top is a brass inscribed plate and a gnomon.	II
Sunny Croft; 54.14431°N 2.59633°W	—	18th century (probable)	A sandstone house with a slate roof, in two storeys and three bays. The mullions have been removed from the windows, and the doorway has a moulded surround above which is an inscribed lintel.	II
Milestone; 54.13542°N 2.61594°W	—	Late 18th century (probable)	The sandstone milestone has a triangular plan and a slightly rounded top. On the sides are incised fingers pointing the direction, on the left to Lancaster, Kirkby Lonsdale, and Ingleton, and on the right to Bentham.	II
Wrayton Farmhouse; 54.14411°N 2.59723°W	—	Late 18th century	The farmhouse is in sandstone with a slate roof, and is in two storeys and four bays. The windows have plain surrounds and contain sashes, and the doorway in the third bay has a Tuscan doorcase with a triangular pediment.	II
The Barn; 54.13391°N 2.61713°W	—	1795	The barn is in sandstone with a stone-slate roof. It has a recessed entrance with a segmental arch. Openings include ventilation slits, pitching holes, and shippon doors. In the apex of the gable end facing the road is a semicircular opening above which is an owl hole with an inscribed stone surround. (Note: Street View in April 2009 shows that the barn has been converted for residential use.)	II
Redmayne House; 54.14458°N 2.59583°W	—	1802	A sandstone house with a slate roof, in two storeys and two bays. The windows are mullioned, and the central doorway has a modern stone lean-to porch. Above the doorway is an oval inscribed plaque.	II
Crow Trees; 54.13680°N 2.61300°W	—	Early 19th century	A rendered house with a slate roof, in two storeys with attics, and three bays. The windows are sashes, those in the ground floor having mullions. In the centre is a portico with two monolithic Tuscan columns.	II
Cringleber Farmhouse; 54.13840°N 2.60507°W	—	Early to mid 19th century	The farmhouse is in sandstone with a hipped slate roof. It has two storeys and a symmetrical three-bay front. The doorway and windows have plain surrounds, the windows being sashes. The doorway has a porch with a cornice and pilaster strips.	II
Milestone; 54.13518°N 2.61632°W		Mid 19th century (probable)	The milestone is in sandstone and has a triangular plan with a sloping top. On the top is inscribed "MELLING" and the sides are inscribed with the distances in miles to Hornby, Lancaster, Kirkby Lonsdale, and Ingleton.	II
Church Gate; 54.13437°N 2.61727°W	—	1885	The rebuilding of a house of 1661 incorporating some original material. It is in sandstone with two storeys and three bays. The windows are mullioned. In the right bay is a former doorway that has been converted into a window. Above it is a battlemented lintel inscribed with initials and dates. There are ball finials on the gables.	II
Wall, steps and gate piers, St Wilfrid's Church; 54.13499°N 2.61662°W		Uncertain	The churchyard wall and gate piers are in sandstone. There are five steps at both the northern and the southern entrances. The gate piers are square with moulded bases and cornices.	II

== Notes and references ==
Notes

Citations

Sources

- Brandwood, Geoff; Austin, Tim; Hughes, John; Price, James (2012), The Architecture of Sharpe, Paley and Austin, Swindon: Historic England, ISBN 978-1-84802-049-8
- Hartwell, Clare; Pevsner, Nikolaus (2009) [1969], Lancashire: North, The Buildings of England, New Haven and London: Yale University Press, ISBN 978-0-300-12667-9
- Historic England, "Church of St. Wilfrid, Melling-with-Wrayton (1165114)", National Heritage List for England
- Historic England, "Wrayton Hall Farmhouse, Melling-with-Wrayton (1071640)", National Heritage List for England
- Historic England, "Crowtrees Farmhouse and barn adjoining to south-west, Melling-with-Wrayton (1362561)", National Heritage List for England
- Historic England, "Old Crowtrees, Melling-with-Wrayton (1362563)", National Heritage List for England
- Historic England, "Vicarage, Melling-with-Wrayton (1317463)", National Heritage List for England
- Historic England, "The Old Malt House, Melling-with-Wrayton (1071637)", National Heritage List for England
- Historic England, "Hodgson tomb approximately 7 metres east of Church of St. Wilfrid, Melling-with-Wrayton (1362541)", National Heritage List for England
- Historic England, "Melling Hall Hotel, Melling-with-Wrayton (1317482)", National Heritage List for England
- Historic England, "Church Gates Cottage and barn adjoining to north, Melling-with-Wrayton (1071636)", National Heritage List for England
- Historic England, "Todd's House, Melling-with-Wrayton (1071635)", National Heritage List for England
- Historic England, "Wrayton Old Hall, Melling-with-Wrayton (1165229)", National Heritage List for England
- Historic England, "Sundial south of Church of St. Wilfrid, Melling-with-Wrayton (1071672)", National Heritage List for England
- Historic England, "Sunny Croft, Melling-with-Wrayton (1362564)", National Heritage List for England
- Historic England, "Milestone, Melling-with-Wrayton (1362540)", National Heritage List for England
- Historic England, "Wrayton Farmhouse, Melling-with-Wrayton (1071638)", National Heritage List for England
- Historic England, "The Barn, Melling-with-Wrayton (1071634)", National Heritage List for England
- Historic England, "Redmayne House, Melling-with-Wrayton (1071639)", National Heritage List for England
- Historic England, "Crow Trees, Melling-with-Wrayton (1071670)", National Heritage List for England
- Historic England, "Cringleber Farmhouse, Melling-with-Wrayton (1165046)", National Heritage List for England
- Historic England, "Milestone, Melling-with-Wrayton (1071671)", National Heritage List for England
- Historic England, "Church Gate, Melling-with-Wrayton (1362562)", National Heritage List for England
- Historic England, "Churchyard wall bordering Main Street, with steps at north and south ends, and gate piers at south end, Melling-with-Wrayton (1362560)", National Heritage List for England
- Historic England, Listed Buildings
