= Listed buildings in Tunstall, Lancashire =

Tunstall is a civil parish in Lancaster, Lancashire, England. It contains eight listed buildings that are recorded in the National Heritage List for England. Of these, one is listed at Grade I, the highest of the three grades, and the others are at Grade II, the lowest grade. The parish contains the village of Tunstall, and is otherwise rural. The listed buildings consist of houses, a church, a sundial base, and a milestone.

== Key ==
Grade	Criteria
I	Buildings of exceptional interest, sometimes considered to be internationally important
II	Buildings of national importance and special interest

== Buildings ==
Name and location	Photograph	Date	Notes	Grade
St John the Baptist's Church; 54.15965°N 2.59240°W		c. 1415	The church was restored and extended in 1907 by Austin and Paley. It is in sandstone with a slate roof, and consists of a nave and chancel under a continuous roof, aisles, a two-storey south porch, and a west tower. The tower has diagonal buttresses and an embattled parapet. A Roman votive stone has been built into the surround of a window in the north aisle.	I
Tarnwater; 54.15644°N 2.60325°W	—	1699	A house in sandstone with a slate roof, it has two storeys and three bays. The windows are mullioned, and the central doorway has a moulded surround and an inscribed battlemented lintel.	II
Old Vicarage; 54.15673°N 2.60035°W	—	1736	A sandstone house with a slate roof, in two storeys and three bays. The windows are mullioned, and the doorway on the left side has a moulded surround forming an ogee shape on the lintel. On the front of the house is an oval inscribed plaque.	II
Sundial base 54.15952°N 2.59255°W	—	18th century (probable)	The sundial base is in the churchyard of St John the Baptist's Church. It is in sandstone and consists of a round column on three octagonal steps. There is a square cap, and the plate is missing.	II
Gabriel Cottage; 54.15627°N 2.60352°W	—	Mid 18th century	A sandstone house with a slate roof in two storeys. The windows are mullioned. To the right of the main part is a later bay that contains a doorway.	II
Tunstall Hall Farmhouse; 54.15535°N 2.60232°W	—	Mid 18th century	The farmhouse is in sandstone with a rendered front and a slate roof. The house has a T-shaped plan, two storeys and three bays. The windows are sashes, and the central doorway has a moulded surround forming an ogee shape on the lintel. Above the doorway is a triangular pediment.	II
Old School House; 54.15798°N 2.59727°W		1753	Originally a school, later converted into a house, it is in sandstone with a slate roof. There are two storeys and two bays. The central doorway has a moulded surround forming an ogee shape on the lintel. Above the doorway is a plaque flanked by pilasters and a cornice containing an inscription in Latin. To the right of the main block is a wing containing a blocked doorway, a re-set medieval grave slab forming the lintel.	II
Milestone; 54.15705°N 2.60029°W	—	Mid 19th century	The milestone is in sandstone with a triangular plan and a sloping top. On the sides are inscribed the distances in miles to Lancaster, Hornby, Kirkby Lonsdale, and Sedbergh.	II
