= St Wilfrid's Church, Melling =

Coordinates: 54.1347°N 2.6165°W

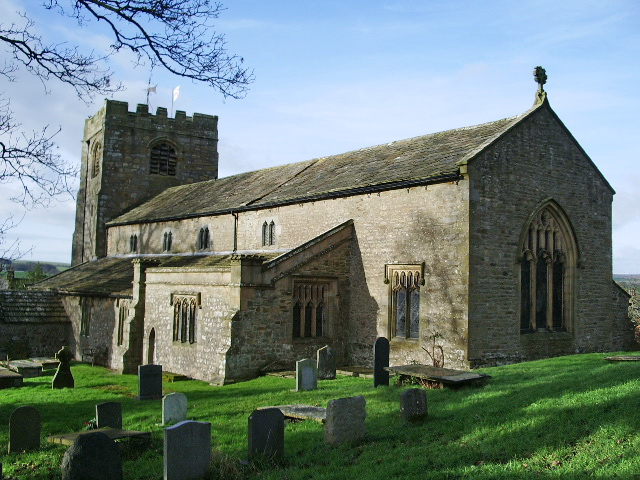
- St Wilfrid's Church, Melling, from the southeast

- Location in the City of Lancaster district
- OS grid reference: SD 599 711
- Location: Melling, Lancashire
- Country: England
- Denomination: Anglican
- Website: St Wilfrid, Melling

History
- Status: Parish church
- Dedication: Saint Wilfrid

Architecture
- Functional status: Active
- Heritage designation: Grade I
- Designated: 4 October 1967
- Architectural type: Church
- Style: Gothic, Gothic Revival
- Completed: 1866

Specifications
- Materials: Sandstone rubble Stone slate roof

Administration
- Province: York
- Diocese: Blackburn

Clergy
- Rector: Rev Mark Harrison Cannon

St Wilfrid's Church is in Main Street, Melling, Lancashire, England. It is recorded in the National Heritage List for England as a designated Grade I listed building, and is an active Anglican church in the united benefice of East Lonsdale, the deanery of Tunstall, the archdeaconry of Lancaster and the diocese of Blackburn. Its benefice is combined with those of St Peter, Leck, St John the Baptist, Tunstall, St James the Less, Tatham, the Good Shepherd, Lowgill, and Holy Trinity, Wray.

== History ==
The earliest fabric in the church dates from around 1300 or earlier but, as it is near the earthworks of a motte-and-bailey castle, it is possible that a church has been present on the site since the 10th century. Most of the present church dates from the late 15th century, with a restoration in 1763 when the clerestory was added. In 1891 a further restoration was carried out by the Lancaster architects Paley, Austin and Paley. This included reseating the church, and cost £1,100 (equivalent to £120,000 in 2025). A chapel known as the Morley chapel had been created as a chantry from a pre-existing chapel by John Morley who fought at Agincourt in 1415. This was heavily re-modelled in 1841 when the altar was removed, and was restored as a chapel in 1994–95.

The church was slated to close in 2026 as the congregation were unable to raise £750,000 to fund necessary urgent repairs; however, an anonymous donation of nine gold coins, worth £30,000, was discovered hidden under the altar, saving the church from closure.

== Architecture ==
The church is built in sandstone rubble with a stone slate roof. Its plan consists of a west tower, a nave and chancel under a continuous roof with a clerestory, north and south aisles, a south porch and a south chapel. The tower has diagonal buttresses and an embattled parapet. The west window of the south aisle dates from around 1300. This window includes a fragment of medieval stained glass. Internally, the aisle pews date from the 18th century but the nave pews, the screens, the pulpit, and the communion rails are from the late 19th century. In the chapel is an aumbry without a door and a squint. There are numerous memorial wall tablets. Discovered during the restoration and built into the vestry wall is a piece of Norman chevron ornament, part of a crucifix, and part of a grave slab. The stained glass in the east window was designed by Henry Holiday. The organ was built in 1891 by J. W. Walker of London. There is a ring of six bells which were recast in 1754 from three bells made in the 15th century by Rudhall of Gloucester.

== Notable burials ==
Ann Fenwick of Hornby Hall was buried here with her parents in the middle aisle in 1777. She had been a leading Catholic in the area who had appealed to the House of Lords to claim her rights.

== External features ==
In the churchyard is a sandstone sundial dating probably from the 18th century with a brass plate and gnomon which is listed Grade II. Also listed Grade II are the Hodgson tomb chest dating from the early 18th century, and part of the churchyard wall, the steps leading to the gate and the gate piers. In the southwest corner of the churchyard is the war grave of a World War II airman.

== See also ==
- Grade I listed buildings in Lancashire
- Grade I listed churches in Lancashire
- Listed buildings in Melling-with-Wrayton
- List of works by Paley, Austin and Paley
- Scheduled monuments in Lancashire
