= St Peter's Church, Leck =

Coordinates: 54.1838°N 2.5484°W

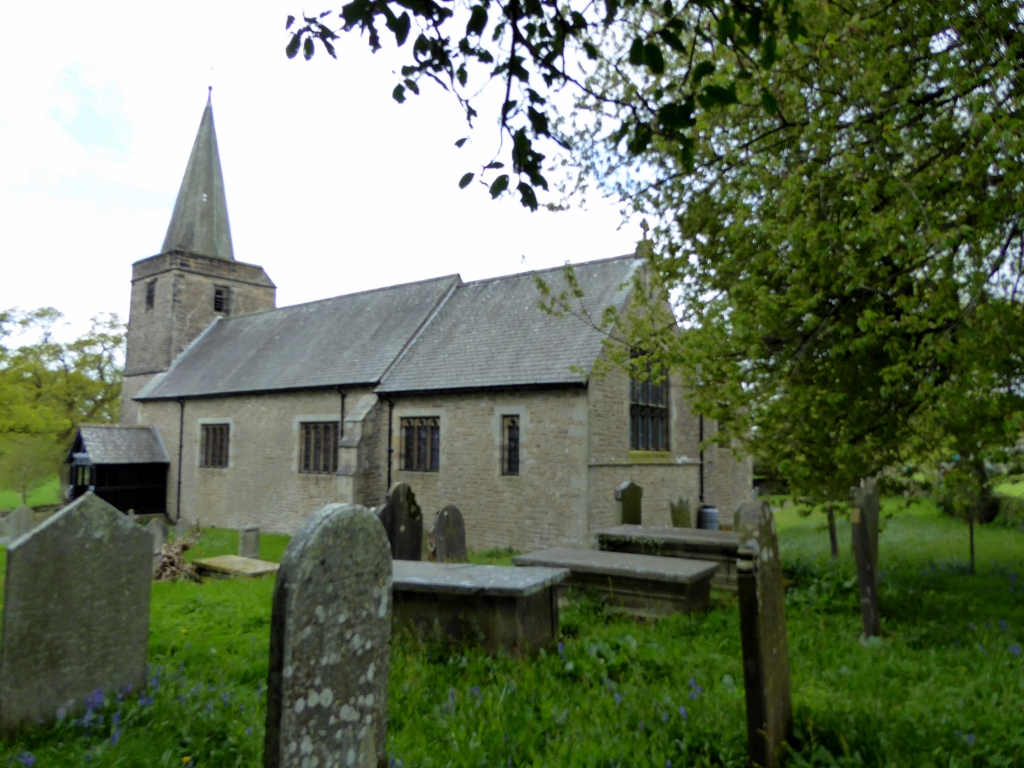
- St Peter's Church, Leck, from the northwest

- Location in the City of Lancaster district
- OS grid reference: SD 643,766
- Location: Leck, Lancashire
- Country: England
- Denomination: Anglican
- Website: St Peter, Leck

History
- Status: Parish church

Architecture
- Functional status: Active
- Heritage designation: Grade II
- Designated: 4 December 1985
- Architect(s): Paley and Austin (1878–79); Austin, Paley and Austin (1915 rebuilding)
- Architectural type: Church
- Style: Gothic Revival

Specifications
- Materials: Sandstone, slate roofs

Administration
- Province: York
- Diocese: Blackburn
- Archdeaconry: Lancaster
- Deanery: Tunstall
- Parish: Tunstall, Melling and Leck

Clergy
- Priest: Revd M. H. Cannon

St Peter's Church is in the village of Leck, Lancashire, England. It is an active Anglican parish church in the deanery of Tunstall, the archdeaconry of Lancaster and the diocese of Blackburn. Its benefice is united with those of St Wilfrid, Melling, St John the Baptist, Tunstall, St James the Less, Tatham, the Good Shepherd, Lowgill, and Holy Trinity, Wray, to form the benefice of East Lonsdale. The church is recorded in the National Heritage List for England as a designated Grade II listed building.

== History ==
The first church on the site was built in 1610; it was a small single-storeyed building. In 1825 it was extended and a small tower was added. The present church was built in 1878–79, and was designed by the Lancaster architects Paley and Austin. It cost £3,000 (equivalent to £320,000 in 2025), and provided seating for 224 people. The church was damaged by fire in October 1913 and rebuilt by 1915 at a cost of about £5,000, it is said accurately to the original design, by Austin, Paley and Austin the successors in the Lancaster practice, Austin and Paley.

== Architecture ==
=== Exterior ===
The church is constructed in sandstone rubble with a slate roof. Its plan consists of a nave with a north aisle and a timber south porch, a chancel at a lower level with a vestry on the north side, and a west tower. The tower is in two stages, and is surmounted by a plain parapet and an octagonal slated spire. In the lower stage is a three-light west window containing Perpendicular tracery. The upper stage contains single-light bell openings. Along the south wall of the nave are four-light windows, and the chancel wall contains windows of three lights and one light. The east window has eight lights.

=== Interior ===
Inside the church a five-bay arcade divides the nave from the north aisle. The timber roof is open. The sandstone font is octagonal. Much of the stained glass survived the fire, and it was reinstated by Powells who used Henry Holiday's original drawings. The original organ was built some time between 1850 and 1881 by Henry Jones. The present two-manual organ was built in 1915 by Harrison & Harrison. There is a ring of five bells, all cast in 1914 by John Taylor & Co.

=== External features ===
The churchyard contains nineteenth century "fever graves" (those of three girls from the Clergy Daughters' School at Cowan Bridge). There is also a war grave of a World War II airman.

== Gallery ==
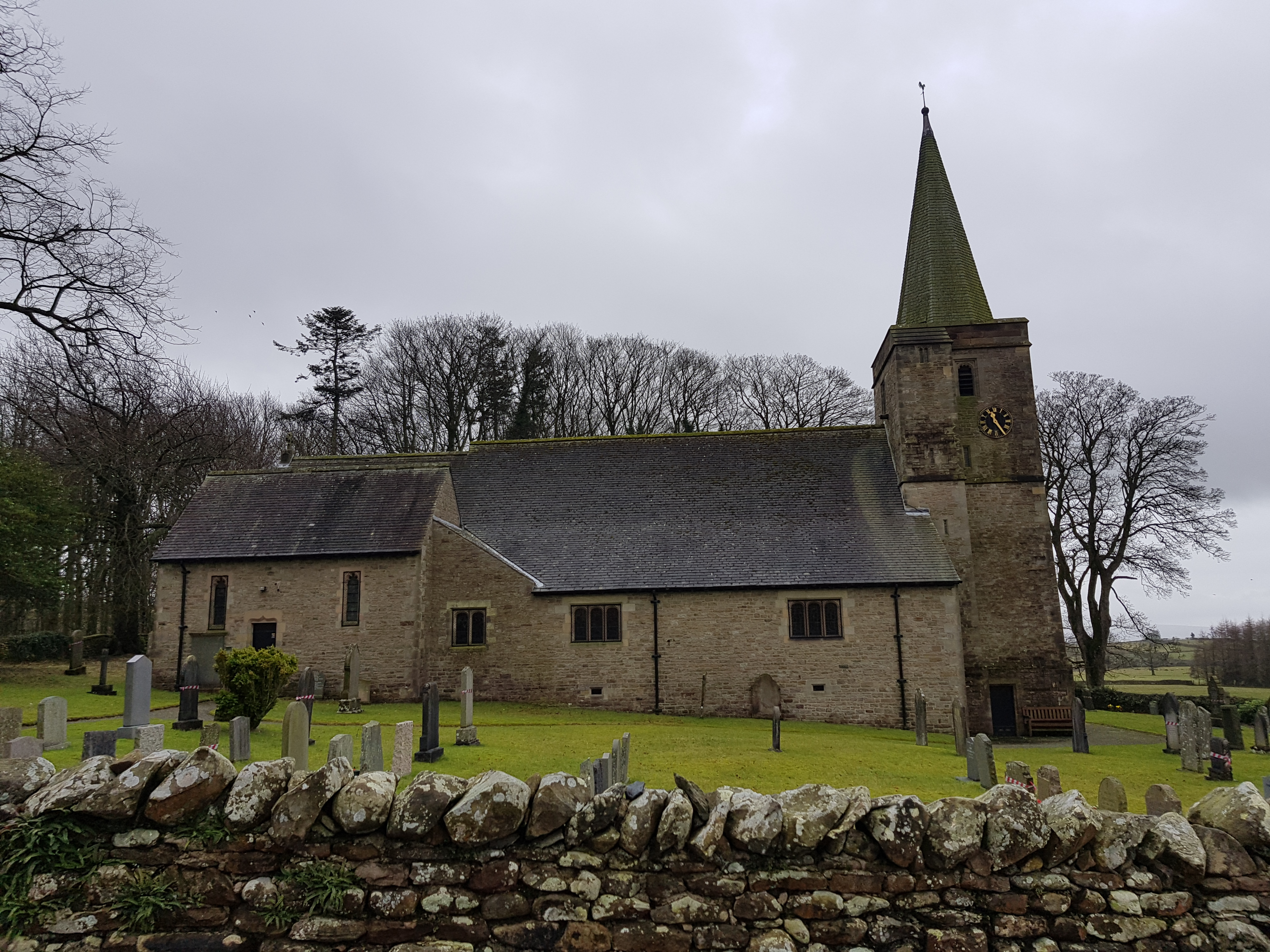

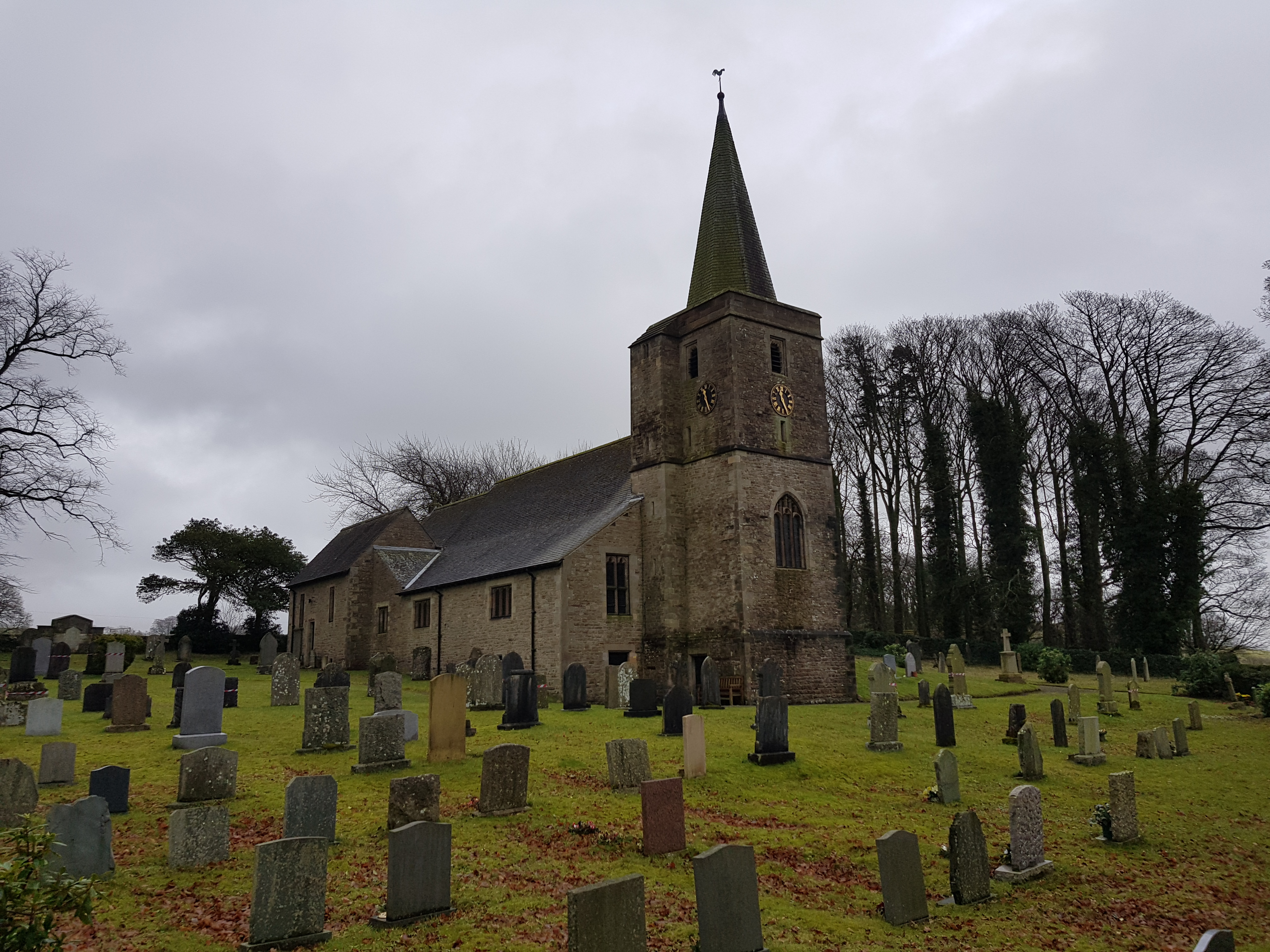

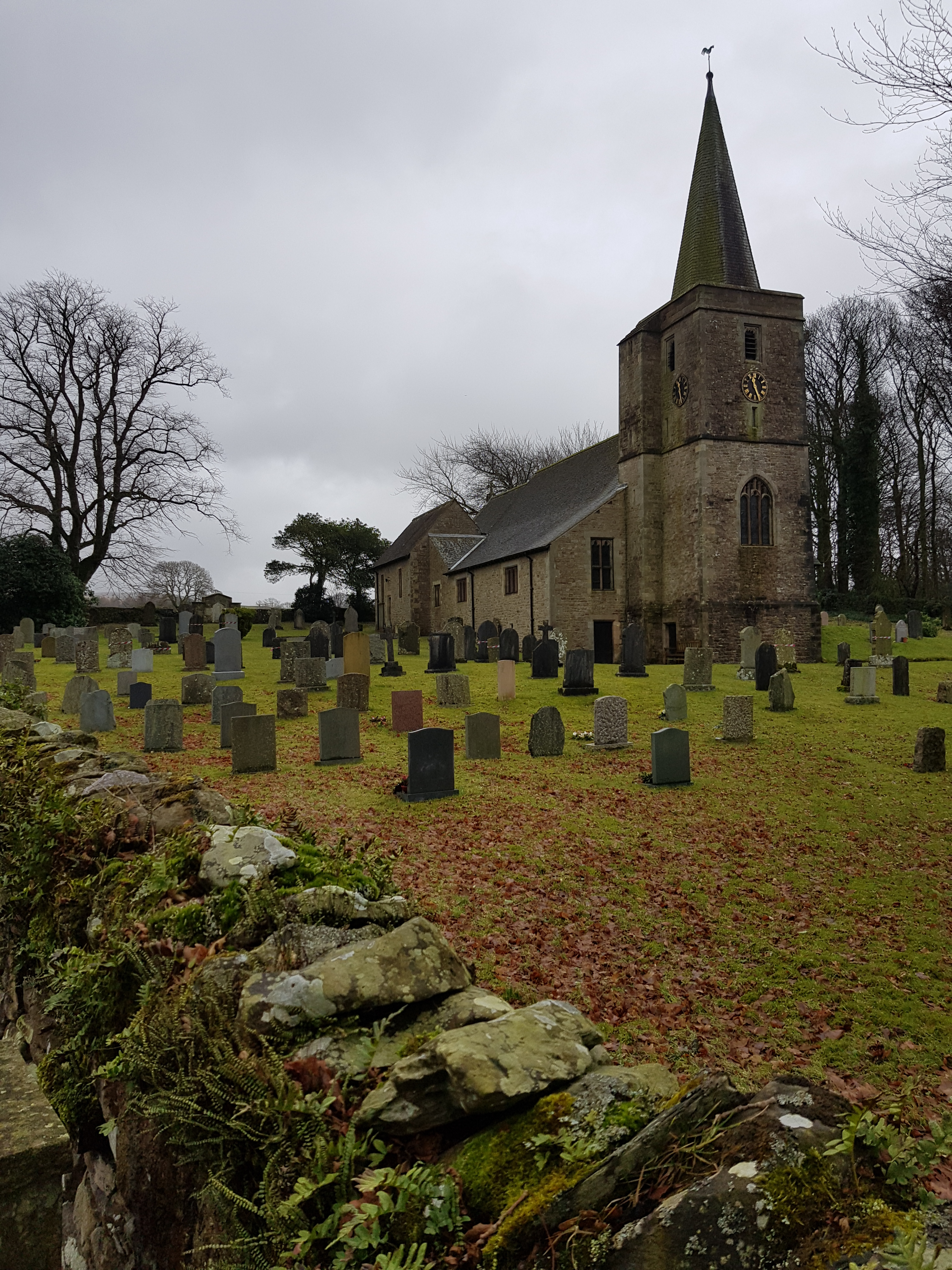

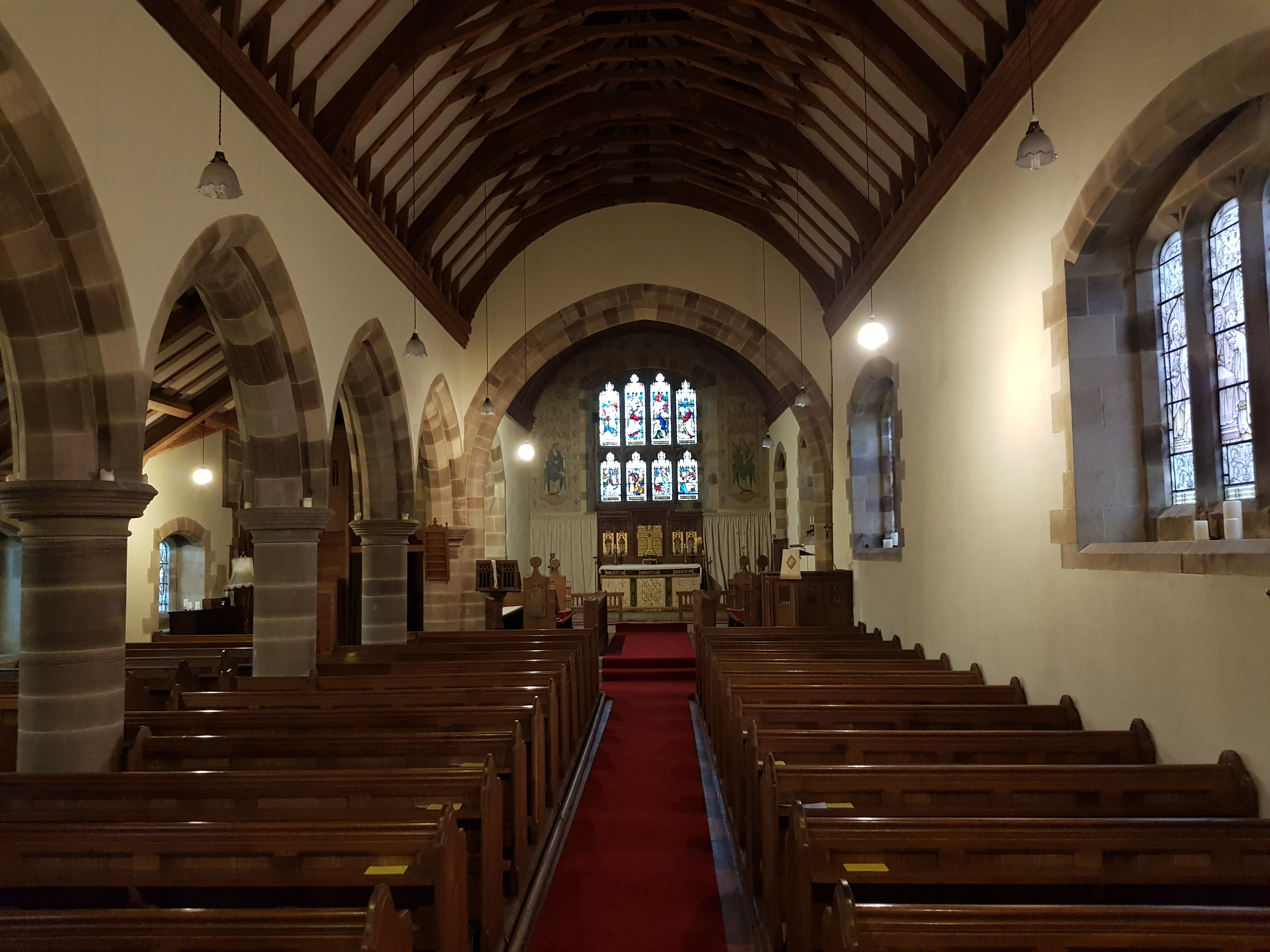

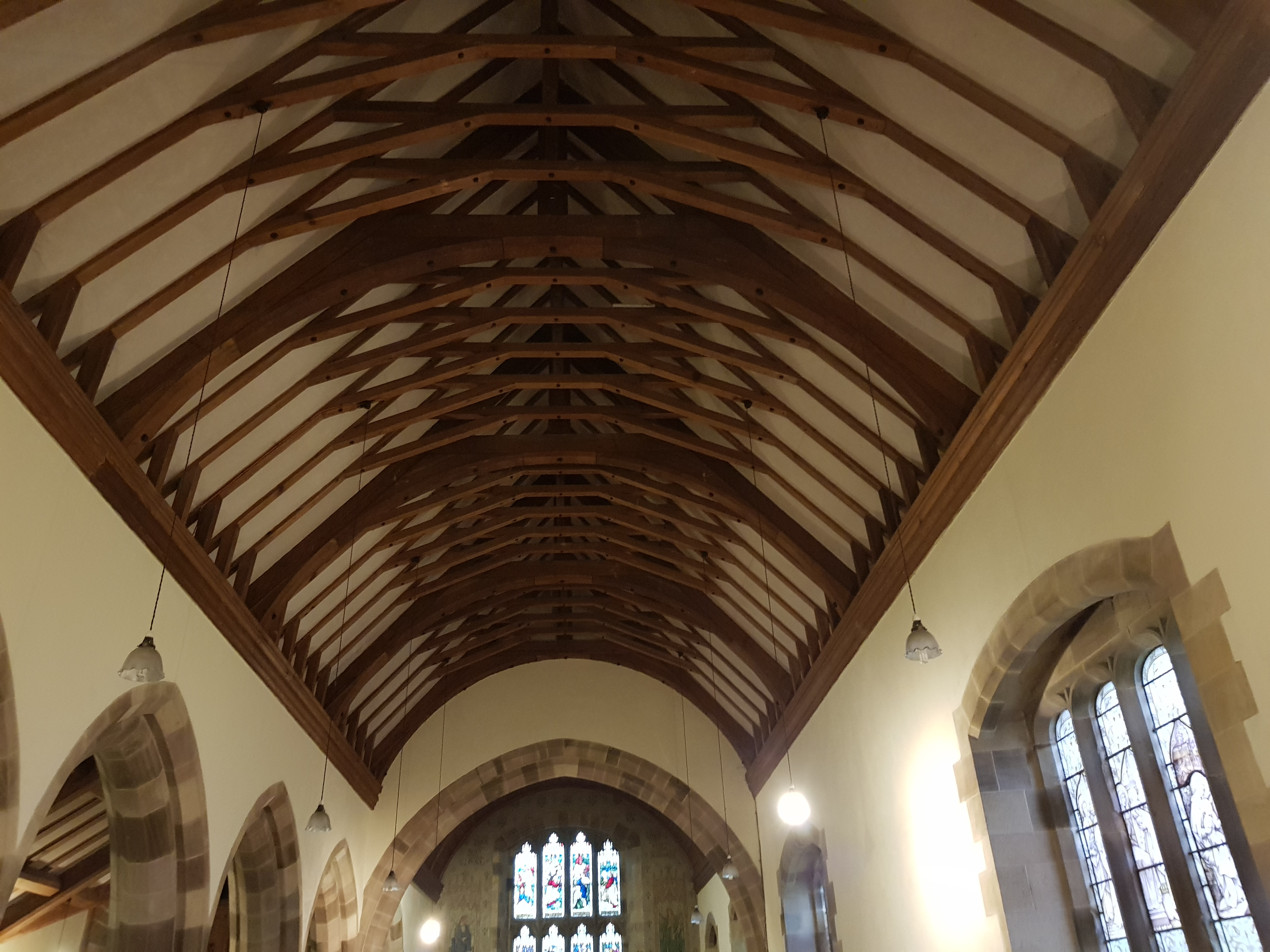

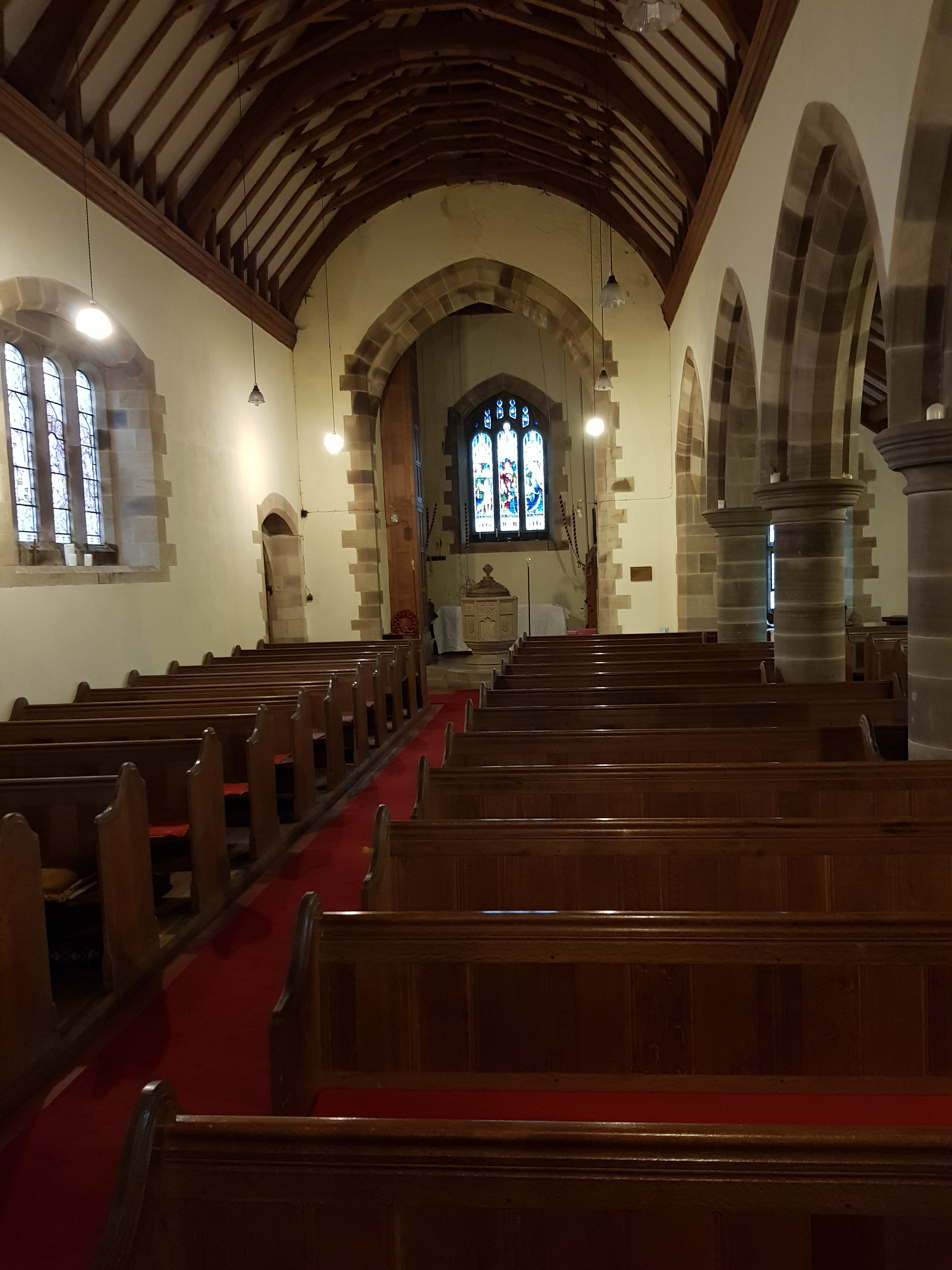

== See also ==
- Listed buildings in Leck, Lancashire
- List of ecclesiastical works by Paley and Austin
- List of works by Austin, Paley and Austin
