= Great Stone of Fourstones =

Glacial deposit in Northern England

The Great Stone of Fourstones The Big Stone
- Glacial erratic
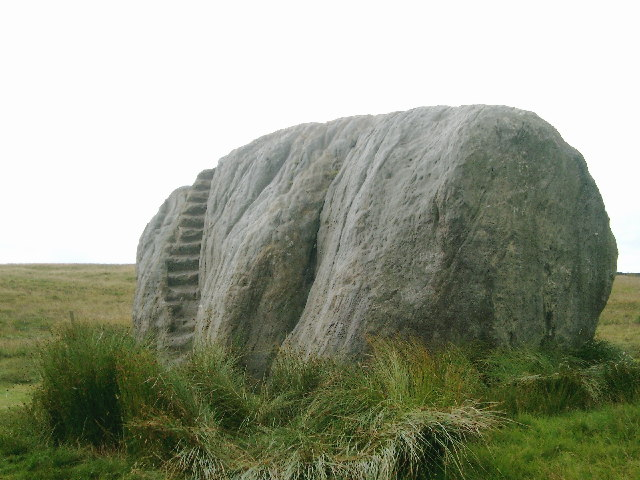
- The Great Stone of Fourstones

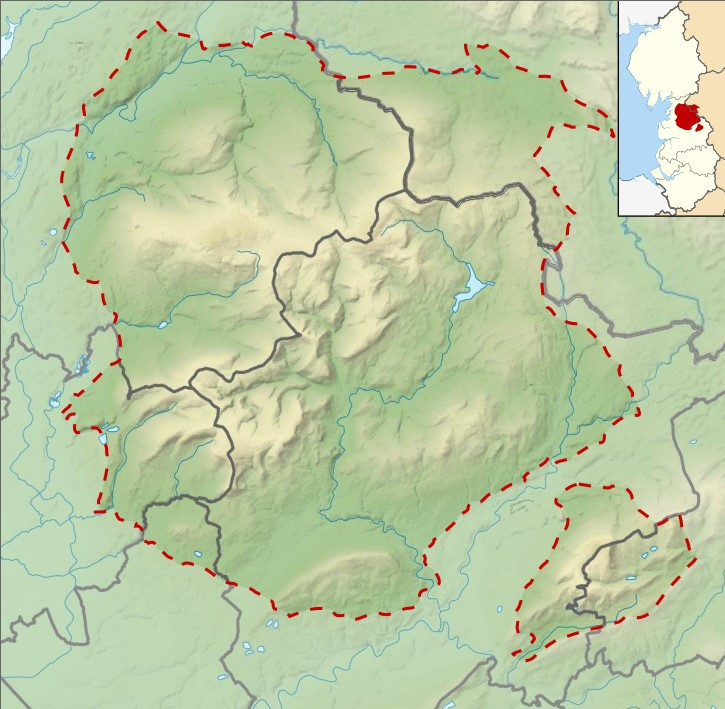
- Location within the Forest of Bowland Location within the City of Lancaster district Location within North Yorkshire
- Coordinates: 54.0915°N 2.5064°W
- Grid position: SD669663
- Location: Near Bentham, North Yorkshire

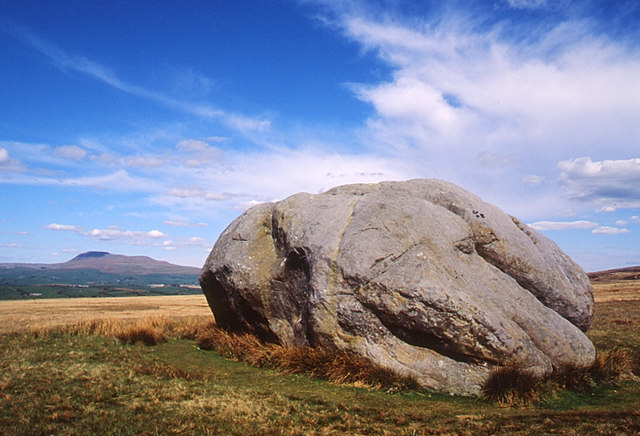
The Great Stone, with Ingleborough in the background

The Great Stone of Fourstones, or the Big Stone as it is known locally, is a glacial deposit on the moorlands of Tatham Fells, England, straddling the county border between North Yorkshire and Lancashire, near Bentham in the District of Craven.

The name suggests that there were once four stones, but now there is only one. The other three were possibly broken up for scythe sharpening stones, or building stone, centuries ago. Large stones such as this were useful as boundary markers in the open countryside, and this one was used as a boundary marker for the Lancashire–Yorkshire boundary between Tatham and Bentham parishes.

A local myth tells how the stone was dropped by the devil, on his way to build Devil's Bridge at nearby Kirkby Lonsdale.

The stone has 14 steps carved into the side of it to allow access to the top. It is not known when they were carved, but they are well worn from years of use.

In John Cary's New and Correct English Atlas published in 1793 The Great Stone of Four Stones is shown on the map

In 1822 Joseph Ashton of Manchester wrote The Lancashire Gazette The Second Edition, describing the Great Stone as "a boundary stone between the counties of York and Lancaster. 2 miles S. of Bentham."

In 1840 The Rural Life of England by William Howitt, Thomas Bewick and Samuel Williams The Great Stone is mentioned in chapter three, Nooks In The World: Life in the Dales of Lancashire and Yorkshire.

In 1863 Edward Baines Esq. MP in the History of the County Palatine and Duchy of Lancaster makes note of The Great Stone of Four Stones under the Tatham Parish, Part of the Lonsdale Hundred.

In 1873 in The Parliamentary Papers, Volume 23 by By Great Britain. Parliament. House of Commons The Great Stone is listed as being on the boundary that divides the parish of Bentham and the county of Lancashire.

In 1904 in Volume 21 of The Transactions of the Lancashire and Cheshire Antiquarian Society, again notes "the Great Stone of Four Stones" as a boundary stone, also called "The Big Stone", about 30 yards west to the road from Bentham to Slaidburn and about 12 miles North-East by East from Lancaster. This book also reports the rock having 14 steps and that on the top are two circular holes that are 2 inches in diameter and 2 inches deep.

== See also ==
- List of individual rocks
