= St Lawrence's Church, Longridge =

Anglican church in Lancashire, England

St Lawrence's Church
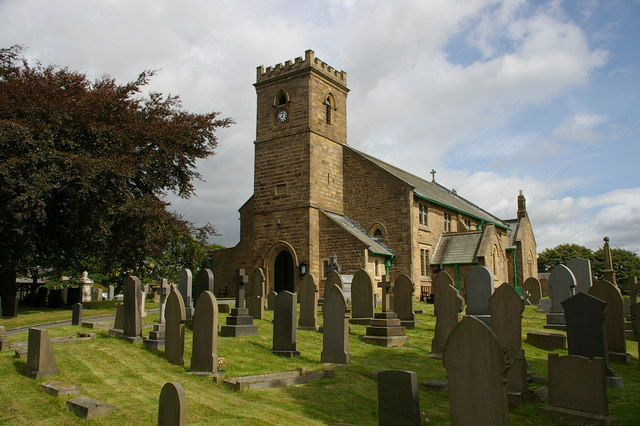
- St Lawrence's Church, Longridge, from the north-east
- St Lawrence's Church
- OS grid reference: SD 60536 36725
- Location: Chapel Hill, Longridge, Lancashire
- Country: England
- Denomination: Anglican
- Website: www.stlawrencewithstpaul.org.uk

History
- Status: Parish church
- Dedication: Saint Lawrence of Rome
- Consecrated: 1552; 474 years ago

Architecture
- Functional status: Active

Administration
- Province: York
- Diocese: Blackburn
- Archdeaconry: Lancaster
- Deanery: Preston
- Parish: Longridge

Clergy
- Vicar: Revd. Mike Barton

St Lawrence's Church, located on Chapel Hill in Longridge, Lancashire, England, is an active Anglican parish church in the diocese of Blackburn. Built as a chapel of ease of St Wilfrid, Ribchester in the early 16th century, it was made a parish church in 1868, a role it now shares, jointly, with the nearby St Paul's Church.

== History ==
The earliest documented reference to a 'Chapel of Longridge' is made in 1522. Rebuilding work took place in 1716 and again in 1784, when the chapel was repaired and enlarged; the tower was added in 1841, and in 1926 a north porch was built at the west end of the nave. In 2005, at the request of Longridge Town Council, a conservation area appraisal and boundary review was conducted. The report recommended the creation of a new zone, and in 2008 the church and its surrounds were designated the St Lawrence's Church Conservation Area. The nearby St Paul's was built as a chapel of ease for St Lawrence.

== Architecture ==
=== Stained glass ===
The stained glass of the north and south sides of the ground floor of the church dates from 1938–40, and is by glassmakers James Powell and Sons. The west window, a memorial to the fallen of the First World War, was designed by the Lancastrian firm Shrigley & Hunt. In 1975, the artist Brian Clarke was commissioned to designed ten pairs of stained glass windows for the north and south mezzanine galleries. The sequence of windows, considered the first works of the artist's maturity, reflect the influence of Japanese screen painting on Clarke's work, depicting local scenes including the River Ribble, Pendle Hill, Longridge Fell and Fairsnape Fell, and the local reservoirs and quarries, designed in a semi-abstract way.

=== Interior ===
Inside the church are two war memorials commemorating fallen servicemen and officers who had been inhabitants of Longridge. A marble tablet notes the casualties of the First World War, and a brass plaque below it lists those who died in the Second World War. The inscription on the tablet reads:

To the Glory of God & to the memory of Longridge officers and men who died for their country in the Great War 1914-1918. This tablet is reverently presented by Parishioners and friends 1939 - 1945.

== Present day ==
St Lawrence's is an active Anglican parish church in the deanery of Preston, the archdeaconry of Lancaster, and the diocese of Blackburn. The church works in association with St Paul's Church, with which it is, jointly and equally, the parish church of Longridge.
