= Listed buildings in Tatham, Lancashire =

Tatham is a civil parish in Lancaster, Lancashire, England. It contains 47 buildings that are recorded in the National Heritage List for England as designated listed buildings. Of these, two are at Grade II*, the middle grade, and the others are at Grade II, the lowest grade. Apart from the small settlement of Lowgill, the parish is rural, containing widespread farms. Most of the listed buildings are farmhouses, farm buildings and houses. The other listed buildings include two churches, two boundary stones, a derelict colliery engine house, a public house, and a telephone kiosk.

== Key ==
Grade	Criteria
II*	Particularly important buildings of more than special interest
II	Buildings of national importance and special interest

== Buildings ==
Name and location	Photograph	Date	Notes	Grade
Church of St James; 54.11910°N 2.60438°W		17th century	The church contains some older remains, the tower was reconstructed in 1722, and the church was restored in 1885–87 by Paley and Austin. It is built in sandstone with a stone-slate roof, and consists of a nave, a north aisle, a south porch, a chancel, a northeast vestry and organ chamber, and a west tower. The tower has two setbacks, and a saddleback roof. The windows contain Perpendicular tracery, and the inner doorway is Norman in style.	II*
Robert Hall Farmhouse and farm building 54.11733°N 2.55674°W	—	16th century	Originally house, with a wing added in the 16th or 17th century, and partly turned into a barn in the later 19th century. It is in sandstone with a slate roof, and has two storeys. Most of the windows are mullioned, and there are some sash windows. The barn has a wide entrance with a re-set cartouche containing a coat of arms above, and a stair turret. Inside there are timber-framed partitions.	II*
Bridge Inn Cottage; 54.11988°N 2.59452°W		1642	A stone house with a stone-slate roof in two storeys, with mullioned windows. On the front is a gabled porch with a moulded surround, a triangular head, and an inscribed lintel.	II
Foss Bank Farmhouse and farm buildings 54.08318°N 2.52024°W	—	17th century	The older part originated as a house, and has been converted into a farm building, the house on the right dating from the 18th century. They are in sandstone with a stone slate roof. The house has two storeys and three bays, with mullioned windows. The farm building contains various openings, some of which have been blocked.	II
Old Rectory; 54.11964°N 2.60515°W		17th century (probable)	The former rectory was altered in the 18th and 19th centuries. It is in pebbledashed stone with a stone-slate roof, and has two storeys and four bays. The windows are mullioned, and on the front is a 19th-century gabled porch. The doorway has a chamfered surround, and a pointed arch with a Latin inscription.	II
Thwaite Moss; 54.09274°N 2.52837°W	—	17th century	A house that was extended in the late 18th or early 19th century. It is in stone with a slate roof, and has two storeys. The original part has two bays, and the windows are mullioned. The extension has windows and doors with plain surrounds.	II
The Green and farm building 54.10553°N 2.54921°W	—	1672	The house and farm building are in sandstone with a tile roof. The original part of the house has two storeys and two bays, with mullioned windows. The central doorway has a two-storey gabled porch, a moulded surround, and a shaped inscribed lintel. To the right is a later extension, and to the right of this is a barn with a wide entrance and doors. At the rear is a re-set inscribed lintel.	II
Green Hall Farmhouse; 54.08134°N 2.51137°W	—	1673	A sandstone house with a slate roof, in two storeys and two bays. In the centre is a two-storey gabled porch. The doorway has a moulded surround and a shaped lintel inscribed with initials and the date.	II
Clintsfield Farmhouse and farm buildings 54.12289°N 2.57271°W	—	Late 17th century	The oldest part is a farm building that was originally a house. To the right of this is a farmhouse dating from the mid-18th century, and at the rear is a barn. These are in sandstone with slate roofs. The front of the farmhouse is pebbledashed, it has two storeys and three bays with mullioned windows. Inside the original building is a bressumer. The barn has a wide entrance with a segmental arch and an inscribed keystone.	II
Green Farmhouse; 54.10532°N 2.55047°W	—	Late 17th century	The farmhouse is in stone with a stone-slate roof, and has two storeys and three bays. In the central bay is a mullioned window. The entrance is through a gabled porch in a lean-to extension to the left.	II
Station House; 54.12400°N 2.58631°W	—	Late 17th century	A stone house with a slate roof in two storeys. The original windows are mullioned, and later ones are sashes. The doorway has an architrave and a keystone inscribed with the date 1731.	II
Swans; 54.06578°N 2.52495°W	—	Late 17th century	The house was extended to the east by two bays in the mid-18th century. It is in sandstone with a stone-slate roof, and has two storeys, with mullioned windows. In the older part is a former doorway with a chamfered surround and an inscribed lintel, and a re-set inscribed plaque. Inside is a bressumer.	II
House and farm buildings (south), Ringstones; 54.08325°N 2.51497°W	—	1676	The house and flanking farm buildings are in sandstone with a stone-slate roof, the farm buildings dating from the 18th century. The house has two storeys and three bays, and some mullions have been retained in the windows. The doorway has a moulded surround and an ogee-shaped inscribed lintel. Both farm buildings have wide entrances with segmental arches.	II
Green Side Farmhouse; 54.10791°N 2.55883°W	—	1678	A stone house with a slate roof in two storeys with a rear wing. Some of the windows are mullioned, and the doorway has a moulded surround and a shaped lintel decorated with a leaf and tendril.	II
Lythe and barn 54.06412°N 2.51310°W	—	1679	The house and barn are in sandstone. The house has a tiled roof, and is in two storeys, some of the windows being mullioned. The doorway has a moulded surround and an inscribed lintel decorated with a leaf and tendril. The barn to the left has a slate roof, a wide entrance with a segmental arch and keystone, and a pitching hole.	II
Russell's Farmhouse and farm buildings 54.11256°N 2.57929°W	—	1682	The oldest part is the farmhouse, the flanking farm buildings dating probably from the late 18th and early 19th centuries. The building is in stone, with roofs mainly of slate, and some tiles. The house has two storeys, and the mullions have been removed from the windows. The doorway has a moulded surround, and a lintel decorated with leaves and tendrils and inscribed with the date and initials.	II
Laith House; 54.10538°N 2.55019°W	—	1690	A sandstone house with s stone-slate roof, in two storeys and an original part of three bays. The windows are mullioned, and the doorway has a chamfered surround and a shaped inscribed lintel. To the left is a former barn, now integrated into the house; it has a wide entrance with an inserted door and window.	II
Rose Cottage; 54.07795°N 2.53179°W		1691	A rear wing was later added later. The cottage is in sandstone with a roof of stone-slate at the front and slate and tile at the rear. There are two storeys and an entrance front of two bays. The windows are mullioned.	II
Lowgill Hall; 54.07838°N 2.53152°W	—	1692	A pebbledashed stone house with a stone-slate roof, it has two storeys, two bays, and a rear wing. Some of the mullions in the windows have been retained. The central doorway has a moulded surround and an inscribed lintel. There is another inscribed lintel re-set in the rear wing.	II
Knott Hill and barn 54.08533°N 2.53055°W	—	1734	The house and barn are in sandstone with a slate roof. The house has two storeys and two bays, and the windows are mullioned. In the centre is a porch with a chamfered doorway and an ogee-shaped lintel. Above the porch is an inscribed oval plaque. The barn to the left has a wide entrance with a segmental arch.	II
Station Farmhouse and barn 54.12401°N 2.58610°W	—	Early to mid 18th century	The house and barn are in sandstone with a slate roof. The house has two storeys and three bays. The windows are mullioned, and the doorway has a moulded surround and an ogee-shaped lintel. The barn protrudes at right angles to the right, and has been partly converted for domestic use.	II
Moorhead; 54.11222°N 2.58174°W	—	1741	A sandstone house with a tiled roof, in two storeys and two bays. The windows are mullioned. In the centre is a porch that has a lintel carved with an oval inscribed plaque. Inside the house is a tunnel vaulted cellar with a well.	II
Lane Head Farmhouse and barn 54.10431°N 2.58423°W	—	1742	The house and barn are in sandstone. The house has a tiled roof, it is in two storeys with an attic, and has two bays. The windows are mullioned, and above the door is an inscribed plaque. The barn to the left has a slate roof, and a wide entrance with a segmental arch.	II
House and barn (east), Ringstones; 54.08345°N 2.51462°W	—	1742	The house and barn are in sandstone. The house has a stone-slate roof, and is in two storeys and two bays, with mullioned windows. In the centre is a single-storey gabled porch, above which is an inscribed plaque. The barn to the left has a slate roof, and a wide entrance with a segmental arch.	II
Tatham Bridge Inn; 54.11996°N 2.59451°W		1744	A rendered public house with a stone-slate roof, in two storeys and three bays. The windows are mullioned, and the central doorway has a flagstone forming a hood. Above the doorway is an inscribed plaque. To the left is an additional bay joining the public house to a cottage.	II
Botton Head Farmhouse; 54.05228°N 2.51923°W	—	Mid 18th century	The farmhouse is in sandstone, and has a roof of slate at the front and stone-slate at the rear. It is in two storeys and two bays, and has mullioned windows. In the centre is a single-storey gabled porch, above which is an inscribed plaque.	II
Far Mealbank Farmhouse and barn 54.10515°N 2.59690°W	—	Mid 18th century	The house and barn are in sandstone with a stone-slate roof. The house has two storeys and two bays. The openings have plain surrounds, and the windows are mullioned. The barn to the left has external steps leading to a first floor doorway; most of the barn projects forward and it contains a wide entrance with a segmental arch.	II
Farr House; 54.07861°N 2.53177°W	—	Mid 18th century	A sandstone house with a roof of slate at the front and stone-slate at the rear. There are two storeys and four bays. The openings have plain surrounds, and the windows are mullioned.	II
Ridleys; 54.12003°N 2.59209°W	—	Mid 18th century (probable)	A house, containing some 17th-century material, in rendered sandstone with a tile roof. It has two storeys and a main part of three bays. The central doorway has a moulded surround and an inscribed battlemented lintel. There is a one-bay extension to the right, and to the left is a former barn with a wide entrance and a segmental arch that has been incorporated into the house.	II
Snap Cottage and Well House; 54.07797°N 2.53134°W	—	Mid 18th century	Two sandstone cottages in two storeys with mullioned windows. Each cottage has one bay. Well House has a stone-slate roof and a door with a flagstone hood, and Snap Cottage has a tile roof and a gabled stone porch.	II
Ivah Farmhouse; 54.07351°N 2.52946°W	—	1755	A pebbledashed stone house with a slate roof, in two storeys and two bays. The windows have central mullions and modern frames, and above the central doorway is an inscribed oval plaque.	II
The Hill Farmhouse; 54.10279°N 2.54582°W	—	Late 18th century	The farmhouse is in sandstone with a slate roof. It has two storeys with cellars, and a symmetrical three-bay front. The openings have plain surrounds, and the windows are sashes. Seven steps lead up to the doorway, which has a moulded hood on consoles. At the rear is a tall stair window with two transoms.	II
Lowgill House and farm store 54.07794°N 2.53207°W	—	1777	The house and store are in sandstone. The house has a tiled roof, and is in two storeys and three bays, with modern windows. In the centre is a modern glazed porch, and above the doorway is an inscribed plaque. The store to the left has a roof of slate and stone-slate, and has two storeys and two bays. (Note: Street View in April 2009 shows that the farm store has been converted for domestic use.)	II
Lanshaw Farmhouse; 54.08147°N 2.50513°W	—	1786	A rendered house with a slate roof, in two storeys and two bays. The openings have plain surrounds, the windows being mullioned. Above the doorway is an inscribed oval plaque.	II
Blands Farmhouse; 54.12162°N 2.57498°W	—	1789	A house in sandstone with a stone-slate roof, in two storeys with a cellar and two bays. The windows in the upper floor are sashes, and below they are modern. The central doorway has a plain surround, above which is an oval inscribed plaque.	II
Hole House Farmhouse; 54.08826°N 2.54241°W		1794	A sandstone house with a slate roof, in two storeys and two bays. The openings have plain surrounds, and the windows are mullioned. Above the central doorway is an inscribed oval plaque.	II
Goose house, Blands Farm; 54.12150°N 2.57526°W	—	Early 19th century	The goose house is surmounted by a pigeon loft, and is in sandstone. It has a square base on which is a conical corbelled hut. There is a faceted dome on the top.	II
Wall, Blands Farm; 54.12136°N 2.57513°W	—	Early 19th century	The retaining wall of the garden is in sandstone, and is roughly circular in plan. It contains seven bee boles, and there are steps leading to the upper garden. There is also a doorway leading to tunnels connecting with underground passages.	II
Boundary stone 54.09058°N 2.50406°W	—	Early 19th century (probable)	The stone marks the boundary with the parish of Bentham, North Yorkshire. It consists of an upright sandstone flag inscribed with the names of the parishes on the front, divided by a vertical line.	II
Boundary stone 54.10514°N 2.53765°W	—	Early 19th century (probable)	The stone marks the boundary with the parish of Bentham, North Yorkshire. It consists of an upright sandstone flag inscribed with the names of the parishes on the front, divided by a vertical line.	II
Clintsfield Colliery Engine House; 54.12365°N 2.56769°W		Early 19th century	The former engine pumping house was converted into a house, but later became derelict. It is in sandstone, and consists of a main block about 25 feet (7.6 m) high and a lower shed to the north with a chimney about 20 feet (6.1 m) high. The engine house is part of a scheduled monument,	II
Crown House; 54.07787°N 2.53180°W	—	Early 19th century	Originally a public house, later converted for domestic use, it is in sandstone with a stone-slate roof. There are three storeys and two bays. The central doorway and the windows have plain surrounds, and the windows are modern.	II
Higher Stock Bridge Farmhouse; 54.08985°N 2.53209°W	—	Early 19th century	A rendered stone house with a slate roof, it has two storeys and two bays. The windows are sashes, and on the front is a single-storey gabled porch. The inner doorway has a re-set 17th-century moulded surround with a shaped lintel.	II
Ivy Cottage and East View; 54.07770°N 2.53197°W	—	Early to mid 19th century	A pair of houses in sandstone with a stone-slate roof, in two storeys. East View, on the right, has three bays, and above the doorway is a moulded cornice hood; Ivy Cottage has two bays. The windows in both houses are sashes.	II
Wenning Cottage; 54.12403°N 2.59036°W		19th century with 17th century remains	The house is in sandstone with a stone-slate roof. The main part has four bays, with a taller extension to the left. The extension has a two-storey canted bay window. In the first bay of the main part is a single-storey porch with a parapet and a Tudor arched doorway, and in the third bay is a single-storey canted bay window. Most of the windows are sashes, and some are mullioned.	II
Church of the Good Shepherd; 54.08310°N 2.53033°W		1888	The church, by Paley, Austin and Paley replaced an earlier church on the site. It is in sandstone with a stone-slate roof, and consists of a nave and a chancel, a central tower, a north vestry, and a south porch. The tower has a pyramidal roof and a coped parapet. The east and west windows contain Perpendicular tracery.	II
Telephone kiosk 54.07765°N 2.53171°W	—	1935	A K6 type telephone kiosk, designed by Giles Gilbert Scott. Constructed in cast iron with a square plan and a dome, it has three unperforated crowns in the top panels.	II

== Notes and references ==
Notes

Citations

Sources

- Hartwell, Clare; Pevsner, Nikolaus (2009) [1969], Lancashire: North, The Buildings of England, New Haven and London: Yale University Press, ISBN 978-0-300-12667-9
- Historic England, "Church of St. James, Tatham (1317663)", National Heritage List for England
- Historic England, "Robert Hall Farmhouse and farm building adjoining to east in same range, Tatham (1071577)", National Heritage List for England
- Historic England, "Bridge Inn Cottage, Tatham (1164901)", National Heritage List for England
- Historic England, "Foss Bank Farmhouse and farm buildings adjoining to west, Tatham (1317640)", National Heritage List for England
- Historic England, "Old Rectory, Tatham (1071576)", National Heritage List for England
- Historic England, "Thwaite Moss, Tatham (1071580)", National Heritage List for England
- Historic England, "The Green and farm building adjoining to east, Tatham (1362588)", National Heritage List for England
- Historic England, "Green Hall Farmhouse, Tatham (1071570)", National Heritage List for England
- Historic England, "Clintsfield Farmhouse and farm buildings adjoining, Tatham (1071612)", National Heritage List for England
- Historic England, "Green Farmhouse, Tatham (1317621)", National Heritage List for England
- Historic England, "Station House, Tatham (1071579)", National Heritage List for England
- Historic England, "Swans, Tatham (1164867)", National Heritage List for England
- Historic England, "House on south side of farmyard at Ringstones and farm buildings adjoining in same range, Tatham (1165021)", National Heritage List for England
- Historic England, "Green Side Farmhouse, Tatham (1362607)", National Heritage List for England
- Historic England, "Lythe (house on north) with barn adjoining to south, Tatham (1362610)", National Heritage List for England
- Historic England, "Russell's Farm House and farm buildings adjoining in same range, Tatham (1164846)", National Heritage List for England
- Historic England, "Laith House, Tatham (1362609)", National Heritage List for England
- Historic England, "Rose Cottage, Tatham (1071583)", National Heritage List for England
- Historic England, "Lowgill Hall, Tatham (1164953)", National Heritage List for England
- Historic England, "Knott Hill and barn adjoining to west, Tatham (1071573)", National Heritage List for England
- Historic England, "Station Farmhouse and barn adjoining to east, Tatham (1071578)", National Heritage List for England
- Historic England, "Moorhead, Tatham (1071575)", National Heritage List for England
- Historic England, "Lane Head Farmhouse and barn adjoining to west, Tatham (1071574)", National Heritage List for England
- Historic England, "House on east side of farmyard at Ringstones and barn adjoining to north, Tatham (1071585)", National Heritage List for England
- Historic England, "Tatham Bridge Inn, Tatham (1071581)", National Heritage List for England
- Historic England, "Botton Head Farmhouse, Tatham (1071587)", National Heritage List for England
- Historic England, "Far Mealbank Farmhouse and barn adjoining to east, Tatham (1362611)", National Heritage List for England
- Historic England, "Farr House, Tatham (1071582)", National Heritage List for England
- Historic England, "Ridleys, Tatham (1317608)", National Heritage List for England
- Historic England, "Snap Cottage and Well House, Tatham (1362573)", National Heritage List for England
- Historic England, "Ivah Farmhouse, Tatham (1362608)", National Heritage List for England
- Historic England, "The Hill Farmhouse, Tatham (1071571)", National Heritage List for England
- Historic England, "Lowgill House and farm store adjoining to south, Tatham (1317500)", National Heritage List for England
- Historic England, "Lanshaw Farmhouse, Tatham (1263069)", National Heritage List for England
- Historic England, "Blands Farmhouse, Tatham (1164639)", National Heritage List for England
- Historic England, "Hole House Farmhouse, Tatham (1071572)", National Heritage List for England
- Historic England, "Goose house approximately 15 metres south-west of Blands Farmhouse, Tatham (1071610)", National Heritage List for England
- Historic England, "Wall surrounding sunken garden approximately 30 metres south of Blands Farmhouse, with tunnel entrances, Tatham (1164661)", National Heritage List for England
- Historic England, "Boundary stone, Tatham (1165032)", National Heritage List for England
- Historic England, "Boundary stone, Tatham (1362574)", National Heritage List for England
- Historic England, "Clintsfield Colliery Engine House, Tatham (1071611)", National Heritage List for England
- Historic England, "Clintsfield Colliery, Tatham (1018920)", National Heritage List for England
- Historic England, "Crown House, Tatham (1164991)", National Heritage List for England
- Historic England, "Higher Stock Bridge Farmhouse, Tatham (1317546)", National Heritage List for England
- Historic England, "Ivy Cottage and East View, Tatham (1071584)", National Heritage List for England
- Historic England, "Wenning Cottage, Tatham (1317560)", National Heritage List for England
- Historic England, "Church of the Good Shepherd, Tatham (1362587)", National Heritage List for England
- Historic England, "K6 telephone kiosk, Tatham (1393359)", National Heritage List for England
- Historic England, Listed Buildings
