= All Saints Church, Preston =

All Saints Church
- Church of All Saints
- Location in Preston city centre
- 53.7633°N 2.7011°W
- OS grid reference: SD 53885 29877
- Location: Elizabeth Street, Preston, Lancashire
- Country: England
- Denomination: Anglican
- Churchmanship: Conservative Evangelical
- Website: www.allsaintspreston.org.uk

Architecture
- Heritage designation: Grade II
- Designated: 20 December 1991
- Style: Classical
- Years built: 1846-1848

Administration
- Diocese: Blackburn
- Archdeaconry: Lancaster
- Deanery: Preston

Clergy
- Vicar: Daf Meirion-Jones (2005-16) Nathan Buttery (2017-)

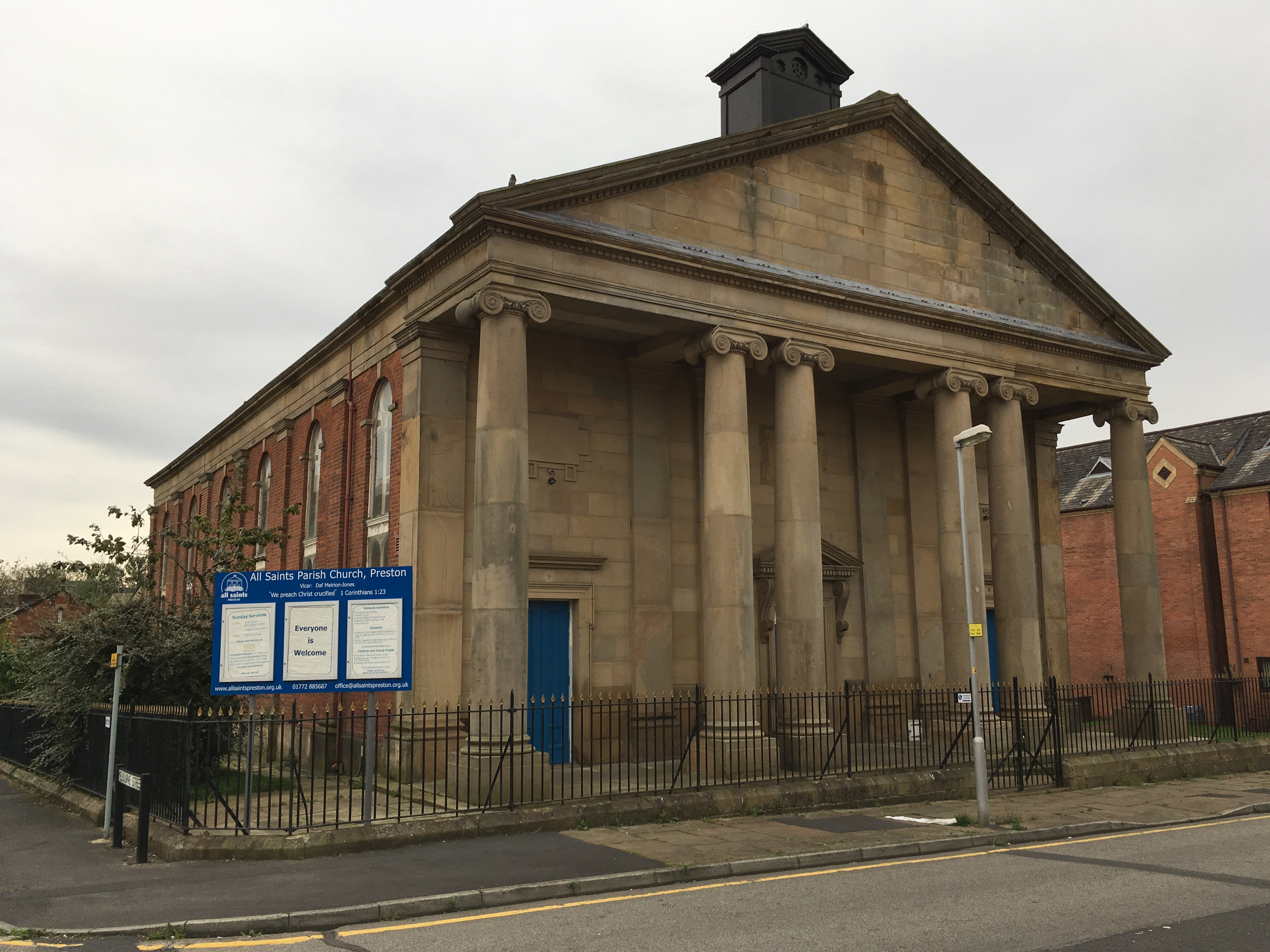
All Saints Parish Church, Preston

All Saints Church is located in Elizabeth Street, Preston, Lancashire, England. It is an evangelical Anglican parish church in the deanery of Preston, the archdeaconry of Lancaster, and the diocese of Blackburn. The church was built in 1846-1848 for the sum of £2000. It was built in the Classical style with six Ionic columns supporting a pedimented portico facade, and is now Grade II listed. It was one of the few churches in the country to be built by subscription and set up under Private Patronage. Nathan Buttery was inducted on 10 January to become the new vicar of All Saints, after their interregnum as their previous vicar, Daf Meirion-Jones, moved to Chessington Evangelical Church.

== See also ==
- Listed buildings in Preston, Lancashire
