= Holy Trinity Church, Wray =

Coordinates: 54.1025°N 2.6074°W

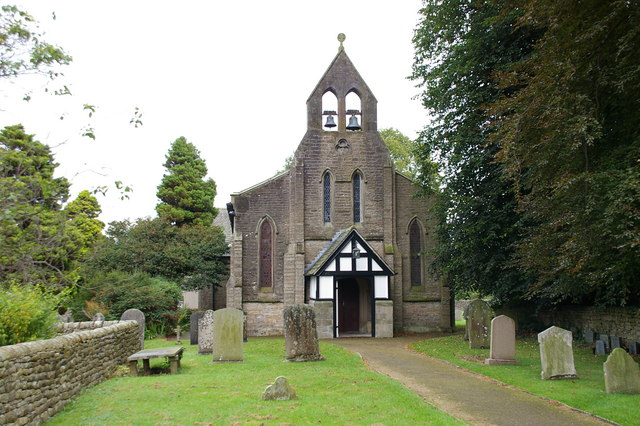
- Holy Trinity Church, Wray, from the west

- Location in the City of Lancaster district
- OS grid reference: SD 60379 67570
- Location: Wray, Lancashire
- Country: England
- Denomination: Anglican
- Website: Holy Trinity, Wray

History
- Status: Parish church
- Consecrated: 1 July 1841

Architecture
- Functional status: Active
- Architect(s): Edmund Sharpe; Paley and Austin
- Architectural type: Church
- Style: Gothic Revival
- Groundbreaking: 1839
- Completed: 1840

Administration
- Province: York
- Diocese: Blackburn
- Archdeaconry: Lancaster
- Deanery: Tunstall
- Parish: Wray

Clergy
- Rector: Revd Jane Lee

Holy Trinity Church is in the village of Wray, Lancashire, England. It is an active Anglican parish church in the deanery of Tunstall, the archdeaconry of Lancaster, and the diocese of Blackburn. Its benefice is united with those of St Peter, Leck, St Wilfrid, Melling, St John, Tunstall, St James the Less, Tatham, and the Good Shepherd, Tatham Fells, Lowgill.

== History ==
The church was built in 1839–40 and designed by the Lancaster architect Edmund Sharpe. Its cost was £2,021 (equivalent to £180,000 in 2025). The foundation stone was laid on 28 May 1839, and the church was completed the following year, although it was not consecrated until 1 July 1841, when the Bishop of Chester performed the ceremony. In 1879–80 the church was enlarged by Sharpe's successors, Paley and Austin, who rebuilt the chancel, reseated the church, and added an organ chamber and a porch at a cost of £1,307. In 1889 the same practice, now Austin, Paley and Austin, added a new nave roof, and altered the west elevation.

== Architecture ==
Holy Trinity has a three-bay nave, each bay containing a triple lancet window. At the west end are four lancets, one on each side and two over the entrance. The chancel, added by Paley and Austin, has two bays and a three-light east window containing Decorated tracery. At the west end of the church is a double bellcote. Inside the church is a west gallery, containing the organ. The two-manual organ was made in 1879 by Gray and Davison and overhauled in 1980 by R. D. and E. H. Holmes.

== See also ==
- List of architectural works by Edmund Sharpe
- List of ecclesiastical works by Paley and Austin
- List of works by Austin, Paley and Austin
