= River Greta (Lune) =

River in Lancashire and North Yorkshire, England

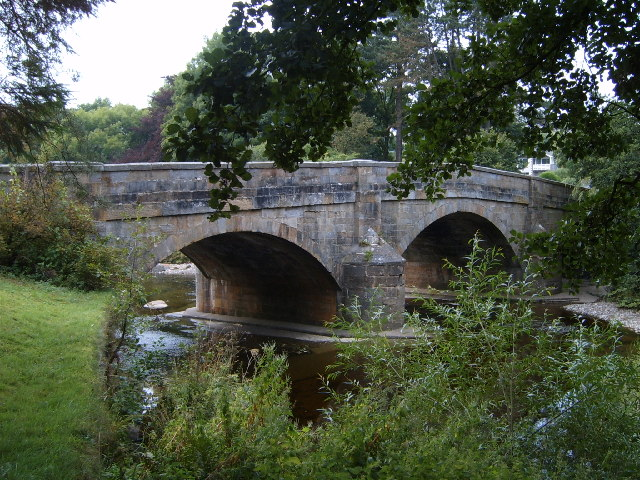
- Bridge over the River Greta in Burton-in-Lonsdale

Location
- Country: United Kingdom
- Part: England
- County: Lancashire

Physical characteristics
- Source
  - location: Ingleton
  - coordinates: 54.1552°N 2.4668°W
- Mouth
  - location: Thurland Castle
  - coordinates: 54.149°N 2.613°W
- Length: 22 km (14 mi)

Basin features
- River system: River Lune

The River Greta is a river flowing through Lancashire and North Yorkshire in the north of England.

The river is formed by the confluence of the River Twiss and the River Doe at Ingleton.

From Ingleton, the Greta travels westward through Burton-in-Lonsdale and, over the border in Lancashire, Cantsfield and Wrayton, passing Thurland Castle, where the Greta flows into the River Lune.
