= Thurland Castle =

Listed building in Lancashire, England

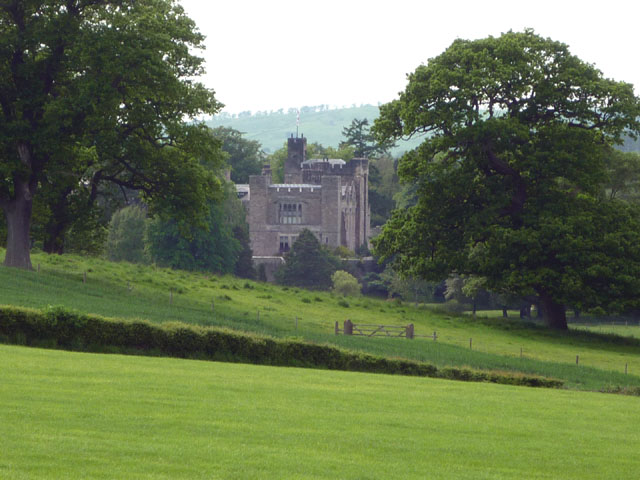
- Thurland Castle, looking west from the A687

- Location in the City of Lancaster district

General information
- Architectural style: Elizabethan Revival and Gothic Revival
- Location: Between Cantsfield and Tunstall, Lancashire, England
- Coordinates: 54.1520°N 2.5978°W
- Years built: 14th century 1879–85 (rebuilt)

Design and construction
- Architect: Paley and Austin

Listed Building – Grade II*
- Official name: Thurland Castle
- Designated: 4 October 1967
- Reference no.: 1164439

Thurland Castle is a country house in Lancashire, England, which has been converted into apartments. Surrounded by a moat, and located in parkland, it was originally a defensive structure, one of a number of castles in the Lune Valley. It is recorded in the National Heritage List for England as a designated Grade II* listed building. Situated between the villages of Cantsfield and Tunstall, the castle is built on a mound and is encircled by a moat. The River Greta runs to the south and the Cant beck to the north.

== History ==
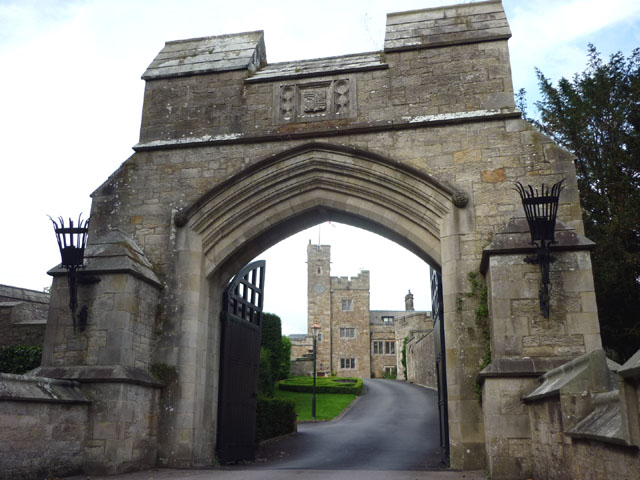
Thurland Castle seen though the arch of the gateway of the bridge crossing the moat

The earliest existing fabric dates from the 14th century. In 1402 Sir Thomas Tunstall (d. 05 Nov 1415), was licensed to crenellate the building. The castle passed through successive generations of the family and was eventually inherited by Tunstall's great-grandson, Sir Brian Tunstall, a knightly hero who died at the Battle of Flodden in 1513.

Sir Brian was a younger son of Thomas Tunstall III and the heir of his brother Thomas IV. Dubbed the "Stainless Knight" by the king, he was immortalised in the poem Marmion - A Tale of Flodden Field by Sir Walter Scott. His son Marmaduke was High Sheriff of Lancashire in 1544.

The castle stayed in the family for two or three more generations until it was sold to John Girlington in 1605. It passed to his grandson Sir John Girlington, a Royalist major-general during the Civil War. Parliamentarian forces besieged the castle in 1643. The damage was described as "ruinous." Sir John's son, also John, was High Sheriff of Lancashire for 1663.

Work was done on the building to convert it to a country house in 1810 by Jeffry Wyattville, and in 1826–29 by George Webster, but in 1876 it was gutted by fire. The owner, Mr North North, commissioned the Lancaster architects Paley and Austin to rebuild it, and what is now present is mainly their work. Work began in 1879, over 100 men were employed, and it was not completed until 1885. From 1885 until the early 20th century, Thurland Castle was owned by the coal-mining Lees family, formerly of Clarksfield, near Oldham, Lancashire, from a junior branch of which came the writer James Lees-Milne. The house and stables have since been converted into several luxury apartments.

== Architecture ==
The building is constructed in sandstone rubble, with slate roofs. It consists mainly of two ranges on the north and west sides of a courtyard. Its architectural style is a mixture of Elizabethan Revival and Gothic Revival. It is approached by an arched bridge crossing the moat. Its windows are either mullioned or mullioned and transomed, and there are two towers, one of which has two storeys, the other three. Many of the parapets are embattled. Around the building are terraces with bastions.

== See also ==
- Grade II* listed buildings in Lancashire
- List of non-ecclesiastical works by Paley and Austin
- Listed buildings in Cantsfield
