= Tunstall, Lancashire =

Village in Lancashire, England

Coordinates: 54.155°N 2.602°W

Tunstall
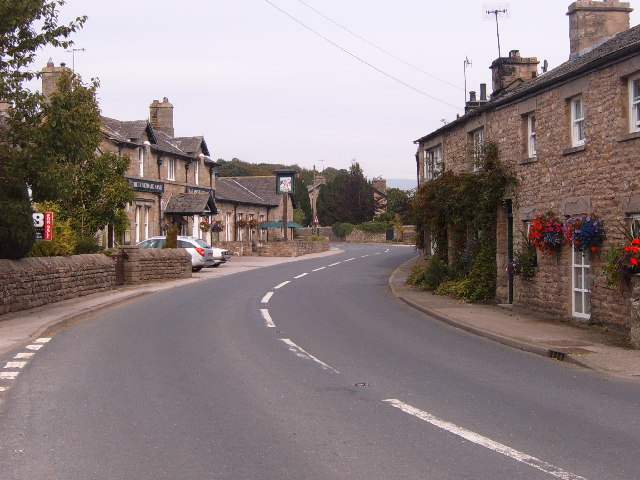
- Tunstall village

- Location in the City of Lancaster district Location within Lancashire
- Population: 223 (2011)
- OS grid reference: SD607736
- Civil parish: Tunstall
- District: City of Lancaster
- Shire county: Lancashire
- Region: North West
- Country: England
- Sovereign state: United Kingdom
- Post town: CARNFORTH
- Postcode district: LA6
- Dialling code: 015242
- Police: Lancashire
- Fire: Lancashire
- Ambulance: North West
- UK Parliament: Morecambe and Lunesdale

Tunstall is a village in north Lancashire, England (grid reference SD607736). It is 11.1 miles (18 km) northeast of Lancaster on the A683 road between Lancaster and Kirkby Lonsdale. In the 2001 census the civil parish of Tunstall had a population of 105. In the 2011 census Tunstall was grouped with Cantsfield (2001 pop. 76) to give a total of 223.

To the north east of the village is the Grade I listed Church of St John the Baptist.

Several houses, a restaurant, a village hall, and a tennis court make up most of the village of Tunstall. The restaurant/pub, called the Lunesdale Arms hosts many village activities, such as carol services and quizzes. To the south of the village is Thurland Castle, which dates from the fourteenth century. It was made ruinous following a siege in 1643, restored in 1809 and 1829, then gutted by fire in 1879 and rebuilt. It is now divided into apartments.

== Gallery ==
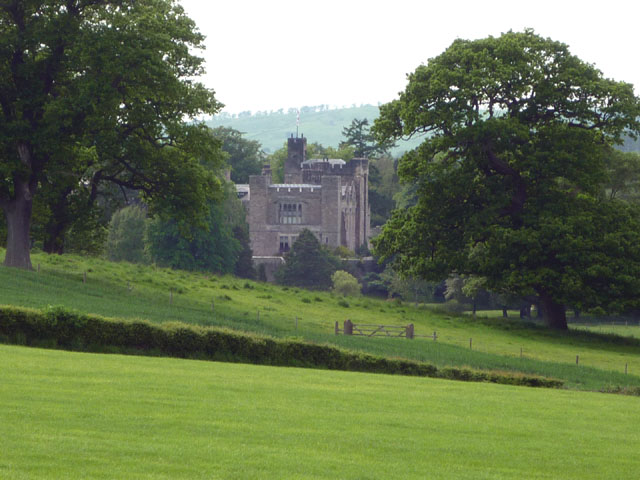
Thurland Castle

== See also ==
- Listed buildings in Tunstall, Lancashire
