= Tatham, Lancashire =

Coordinates: 54.119°N 2.605°W

Tatham
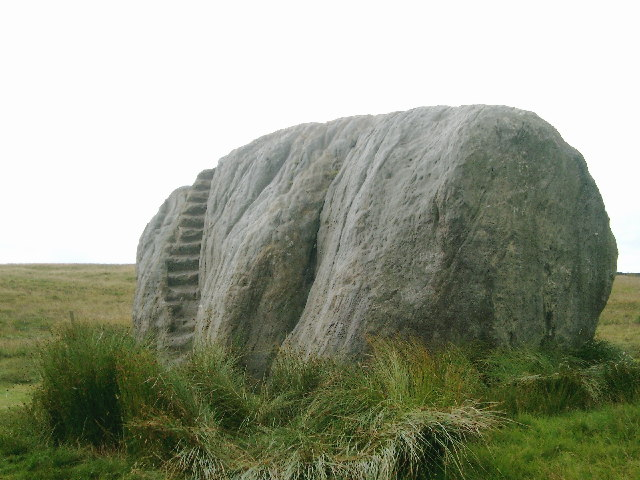
- Great Stone of Fourstones

- Location in the City of Lancaster district Location within Lancashire
- Population: 396 (2011)
- OS grid reference: SD605695
- Civil parish: Tatham
- District: Lancaster
- Shire county: Lancashire
- Region: North West
- Country: England
- Sovereign state: United Kingdom
- Post town: LANCASTER
- Postcode district: LA2
- Dialling code: 01524
- Police: Lancashire
- Fire: Lancashire
- Ambulance: North West
- UK Parliament: Morecambe and Lunesdale

Tatham is a village and civil parish in the City of Lancaster district in Lancashire, England. In 2001, it had a population of 393, increasing slightly to 396 at the 2011 Census.

A large part of the parish of Tatham is an upland area, known as Tatham Fells, which includes the largest settlement in Tatham, Lowgill; its highest point, at Ward's Stone; and the Great Stone of Fourstones, known locally as "the Big Stone".

== See also ==
- Listed buildings in Tatham, Lancashire
