= Capernwray Chapel =

Coordinates: 54.1440°N 2.7029°W

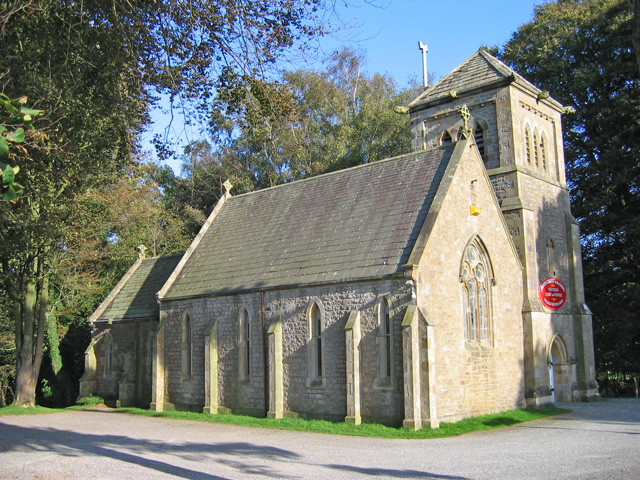
- Capernwray Chapel from the northwest

- Location of Capernwray Chapel in the City of Lancaster district
- OS grid reference: SD 542,722
- Location: Capernwray, Over Kellet, Lancashire
- Country: England
- Denomination: Independent
- Churchmanship: Evangelical

History
- Status: Chapel
- Founded: 1840
- Founder: George Marton

Architecture
- Functional status: Active
- Architect(s): Edmund Sharpe; E. G. Paley
- Architectural type: Church
- Style: Gothic Revival
- Groundbreaking: 1835
- Completed: 1857

Specifications
- Materials: Sandstone rubble Slate roofs

Listed Building – Grade II
- Official name: Capernwray Church
- Designated: 7 November 1983
- Reference no.: 1164650

Capernwray Chapel is in the village of Capernwray, Over Kellet, Lancashire, England. Formerly the chapel to Capernwray Hall, it is now an independent Evangelical chapel. It is recorded in the National Heritage List for England as a designated Grade II listed building.

== History ==
The chapel was built by Mr and Mrs George Marton between 1835 and 1840 as a private chapel for Capernwray Hall. George Marton was Lord Lieutenant of Lancashire and in addition to Capernwray Hall, owned Borwick Hall, Borwick railway station, and a number of farms. It was designed by the Lancaster architect Edmund Sharpe and at that stage consisted of a simple rectangle. The chapel could seat 100 people, and the gallery formed the family pew. In 1856 E. G. Paley, Sharpe's successor, added the tower, chancel and west window. During the Second World War, the boarders from Ripley St Thomas School, Lancaster, were evacuated to Capernwray Hall and used the chapel for worship. After the war, in 1946, Major W. Ian Thomas and his wife bought the hall and the chapel for the use of Capernwray Missionary Fellowship of Torchbearers. By 1962 it had become too small for the numbers using it and it was converted into a dormitory by adding a false ceiling and dormer windows to make an upper floor. Having been disused for a time, the Evangelical Fellowship were given the use of the chapel by Mrs Thomas.

== Architecture ==
Capernwray Chapel is constructed in sandstone rubble with slate roofs. Its plan consists of a four-bay nave, a two-bay chancel at a lower level and a southwest tower over the porch. The windows on the north and south walls are all lancets, at the east end is a three-light lancet window and at the west end is a five-light window. There is a doorway in the north chancel wall. The tower has five stages with clasping buttresses. In the lowest stage is a west doorway above which is a lancet window. The bell openings consist of louvred three-light lancets. At the top of the tower is a pyramidal roof with a weather vane. Gargoyles protrude from the gutters and on the gables are cross finials.

== See also ==
- Listed buildings in Over Kellet
- List of architectural works by Edmund Sharpe
- List of ecclesiastical works by E. G. Paley
