= Listed buildings in Borwick =

Borwick is a civil parish in Lancaster, Lancashire, England. It contains 27 listed buildings that are recorded in the National Heritage List for England. Of these, three are listed at Grade I, the top grade, and the others are at Grade II, the lowest of the three grades of listing. The parish contains the village of Borwick, and is otherwise rural. The most important building in the parish is Borwick Hall; this and a number of associated buildings and structures are listed. The Lancaster Canal passes through the parish, and associated with it are five listed bridges and an aqueduct. The other listed buildings include houses, farm buildings, bridges over the River Keer, a church, a milestone, and a telephone kiosk.

== Key ==
Grade	Criteria
I	Buildings of exceptional interest, sometimes considered to be internationally important
II	Buildings of national importance and special interest

== Buildings ==
Name and location	Photograph	Date	Notes	Grade
Borwick Hall; 54.15096°N 2.72797°W		14th century	A large house, later used as a residential centre. It originated as a medieval tower that was incorporated in an Elizabethan house in about 1590–95. The house is built in sandstone with a slate roof, it has two storeys with attics, and a main front of seven bays. On the left is a single-bay cross-wing, and on the right is a gabled porch with 2 1/2 storeys. Most of the windows are mullioned and transomed.	I
Balustrade, Borwick Hall; 54.15084°N 2.72808°W	—	c. 1600	The balustrade runs along the edge of the terrace at the southwest front of the hall. It is in sandstone, and has shaped balusters, and moulded coping.	II
Gatehouse, Borwick Hall; 54.15084°N 2.72842°W		1650	The stone gatehouse has a stone-slate roof and is in two storeys with an attic. In the lower storey is a semi-elliptical arch that is flanked by chimneys corbelled out at the first floor level. Above the arch is a datestone, and there are mullioned windows in the upper storey. On the gables are finials.	I
Barn and two cottages, Borwick Hall; 54.15040°N 2.72895°W	—	17th century	Originally a stone barn with a slate roof, part of which was later converted into two cottages. The cottages are in two storeys, and in the remaining barn are vertical ventilation slits. On the front is a slated canopy, and at the rear is a later lean-to extension.	II
Garden wall, Borwick Hall; 54.15066°N 2.72818°W	—	17th century	The wall runs along two sides of the garden to the southwest of the hall. It is in stone, and contains two gateways with arched heads.	II
Garden wall and entrance gate, Borwick Hall; 54.15136°N 2.72746°W	—	17th century	The wall runs along two sides of the garden to the north of the hall. It is in stone, and contains two gateways, one with a triangular head, and the other with a re-set inscribed lintel.	II
Stables, Borwick Hall; 54.15068°N 2.72863°W	—	Mid 17th century (probable)	The stables are in stone and have roofs of slate and stone-slate. There are two storeys and six bays. On the side facing the road are windows, those in the upper floor being mullioned. On the other sides are doorways in each bay and similar windows.	I
Pear Tree Cottage; 54.15164°N 2.72763°W	—	Late 17th century	The rendered stone house has a slate roof and is in two storeys. The windows are mullioned. Attached to the left is a former stable that has been incorporated into the house.	II
The Green; 54.15229°N 2.72801°W	—	Late 17th century (possible)	A stone house with a slate roof in two storeys and with a two-bay front. In the centre is an open gabled stone porch.	II
Sanders Farmhouse; 54.15198°N 2.72838°W		1709	The stone farmhouse has a slate roof and is in three storeys with a symmetrical front. All the windows are mullioned. There is a limestone boulder incorporated in the right wall, a flight of external stone steps on the left side, and an 18th-century extension at the rear.	II
Borwick Lodge; 54.15222°N 2.72771°W	—	1729	A pebbledashed stone house with a slate roof in two storeys with an attic, and with a symmetrical three-bay front. The central doorway has an architrave with a pulvinated frieze, a false keystone, and a broken segmental pediment. Above it is an inscribed roundel. The central window in the upper floor has Tuscan pilasters and a semicircular head. The windows are sashes. Single-storey wings were added to the sides in 2005.	II
The Cottage; 54.15227°N 2.72837°W	—	18th century (probable)	A stone house with a slate roof in two storeys, originally two cottages. There is a central doorway with three windows on the ground floor and two in the upper storey.	II
Mansergh House; 54.15178°N 2.72826°W	—	Late 18th century	A pebbledashed stone house with a slate roof in two storeys with attics, and with a symmetrical two-bay front. The door and windows have plain surrounds, and the windows are sashes.	II
Keer Bridge (aqueduct) (No.132); 54.14104°N 2.72089°W		1797	The aqueduct carries the Lancaster Canal over the River Keer. It is built in gritstone and consists of a single arch. At each end are full-height piers.	II
Hodgson's Bridge (No.134); 54.14905°N 2.72427°W		1797	An accommodation bridge over the Lancaster Canal. It is built in sandstone and consists of a single elliptical arch with a projecting keystone, and coping with a rounded top.	II
Borwick Hall Bridge (No. 135); 54.15025°N 2.72974°W		1797	The bridge carries Borwick Lane over the Lancaster Canal. It is built in sandstone and consists of a single elliptical arch with a projecting keystone, and coping with a rounded top.	II
Sanders Bridge (No. 136); 54.15196°N 2.73014°W		1797	An accommodation bridge over the Lancaster Canal. It is built in sandstone and consists of a single elliptical arch with a projecting keystone, and coping with a rounded top.	II
Taylor's Bridge (No.137); 54.15282°N 2.72981°W		1797	An accommodation bridge over the Lancaster Canal. It is built in sandstone and consists of a single elliptical arch with a projecting keystone, and coping with a rounded top.	II
Tewitfield Old Turnpike Bridge (No 138); 54.15405°N 2.73536°W		1797	The bridge carries Kellet Lane over the Lancaster Canal. It is built in sandstone and consists of a single elliptical arch with a projecting keystone, and coping with a rounded top.	II
Keer Bridge; 54.14675°N 2.70580°W	—	c. 1800	The bridge carries Borwick Road over the River Keer. It is built in gritstone, and consists of a single segmental arch, and rounded coping and ends in projecting piers.	II
Beck House Farmhouse; 54.15082°N 2.72579°W	—	Early 19th century	A rendered stone house with a slate roof, in two storeys with attics, and a symmetrical three-bay front. The central doorway has a moulded architrave and cornice hood, and most of the windows are sashes.	II
Milestone; 54.15400°N 2.73319°W	—	Early 19th century	The milestone is by the towpath of the Lancaster Canal, It is in sandstone and has a rectangular plan and a rounded top, and has incised figures in ovals.	II
Old Malt Barn; 54.15005°N 2.71454°W	—	Early 19th century (possible)	The former malt kiln originally had two storeys, and this has been reduced to one. It is in sandstone with a slate roof. The southeast end has been altered and incorporated into a house. The building contains a variety of windows, some older, and some modern.	II
Gateway and gates, Capernwray Hall; 54.14751°N 2.70569°W	—	Mid 19th century	The gateway is in sandstone and consists of a wide moulded arch surrounded by a wall that is stepped above the arch. Over the arch is a coat of arms. The gates are in decorative wrought iron. To the right of the main arch is a smaller pedestrian gateway.	II
St Mary's Church; 54.15437°N 2.72161°W		1894–96	The church was designed by Paley, Austin and Paley in Gothic Revival style. It is in stone with a tiled roof and consists of a nave with a north porch, and a chancel with a south vestry. On the west gable is a small bellcote. At the corners are buttresses rising to crocketed finials. The windows contain Perpendicular tracery.	II
Telephone kiosk 54.15145°N 2.72760°W		1935	A K6 type telephone kiosk, designed by Giles Gilbert Scott. Constructed in cast iron with a square plan and a dome, it has three unperforated crowns in the top panels.	II
Packhorse bridge 54.14072°N 2.72284°W		Undated	A bridge crossing the River Keer. It is in sandstone and consists of a single semi-elliptical arch, nd has no parapets.	II
