= Bindlosse =

Bindlosse is a surname. Notable people with the surname include:

- Robert Bindlosse (1624–1688), English politician
- Francis Bindlosse (c. 1603–1629), English politician
