= Priest Hutton =

Village in Lancashire, England

Coordinates: 54.157°N 2.719°W

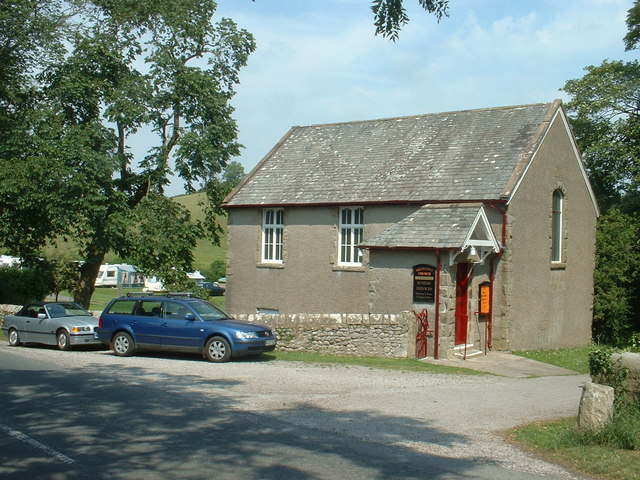
- Tewitfield Methodist Church

- Location in the City of Lancaster district Location within Lancashire
- Population: 185 (2011)
- OS grid reference: SD530737
- Civil parish: Priest Hutton
- District: Lancaster
- Shire county: Lancashire
- Region: North West
- Country: England
- Sovereign state: United Kingdom
- Post town: CARNFORTH
- Postcode district: LA6
- Dialling code: 015242
- Police: Lancashire
- Fire: Lancashire
- Ambulance: North West
- UK Parliament: Morecambe and Lunesdale

Priest Hutton is a village and civil parish in Lancashire, England. It is located 5 kilometres (3 mi) north east of Carnforth, in the City of Lancaster, close to the boundary with Cumbria. In the 2001 census Priest Hutton had a population of 177, increasing to 185 at the 2011 Census.

The village, situated off the A6070 is in a rural area, and has few facilities of its own. The village school closed in 1978, and the nearest school and post office are at Burton-in-Kendal, north of the county boundary. Other facilities, such as Borwick and Priest Hutton Memorial Hall, and St Mary's Church, are shared with the neighbouring village of Borwick, south of Priest Hutton. Priest Hutton has no parish council, instead there is a parish meeting at the Memorial Hall.

In the south west corner of the parish, at Tewitfield, there is a marina on the Lancaster Canal, currently the northern terminus of the canal's navigable section.

The former archbishop of York, Matthew Hutton, was born in the village in 1529.

== See also ==
- Listed buildings in Priest Hutton
