= Deep fryer =

Type of cooking appliance

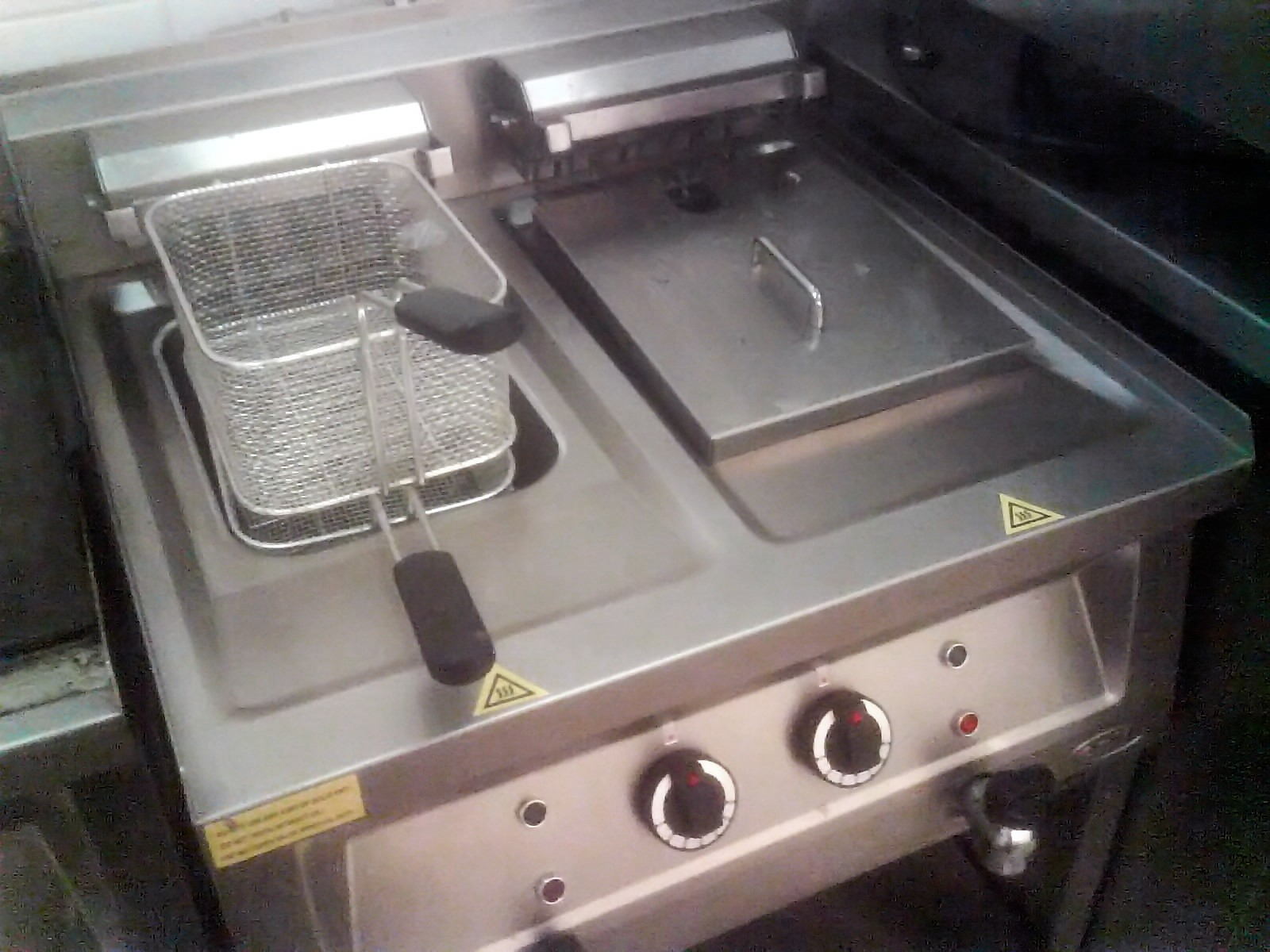
A deep fryer for restaurant use

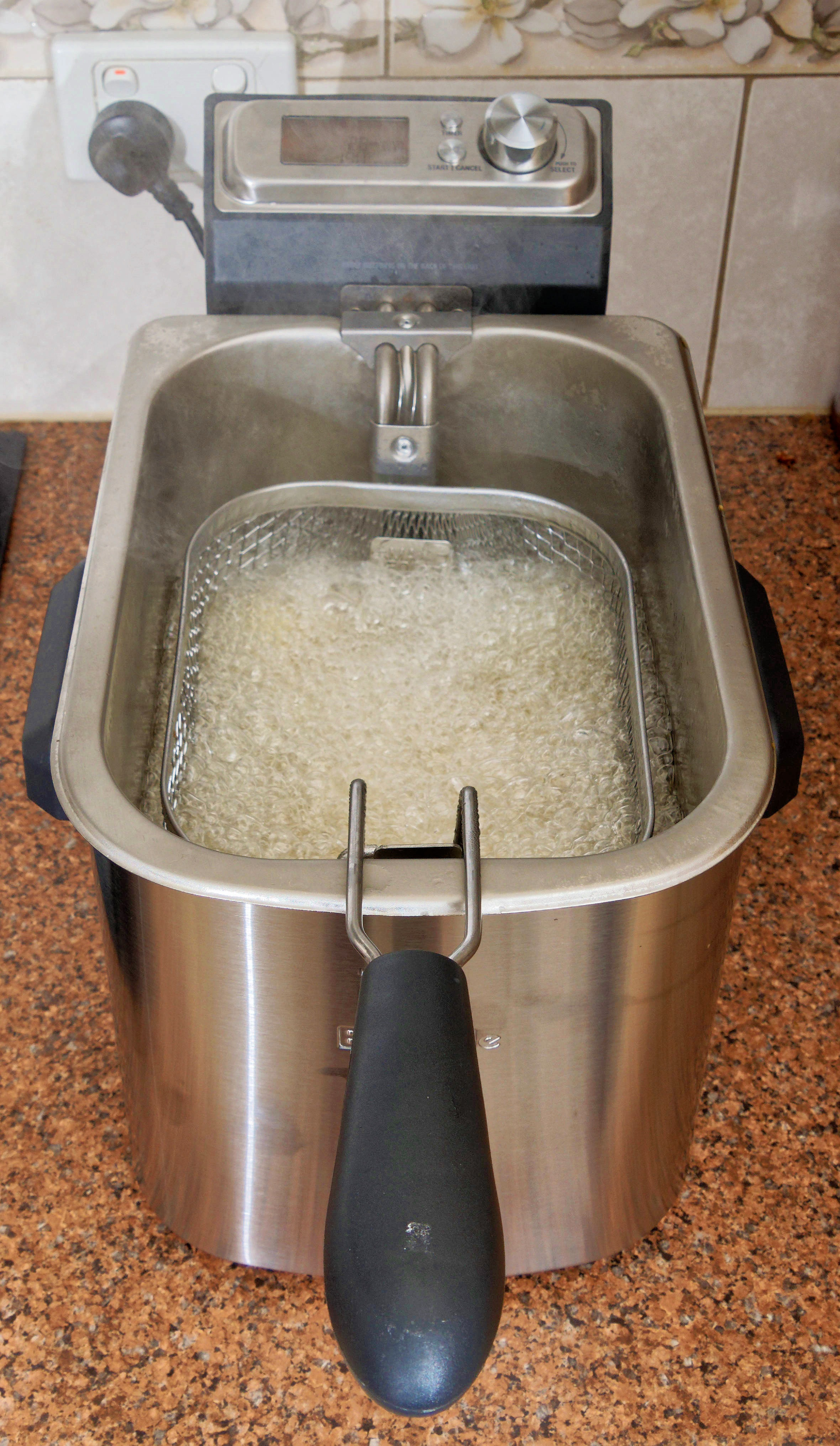
Domestic deep fryer in operation

A deep fryer (also known as a deep fat fryer, sometimes spelled frier, or referred to as a fryolator, or to its French name friteuse) is a kitchen appliance used to cook foods by full immersion in hot oil—deep frying. The cooking oil (or fats) are typically between temperatures of 175 to 190 °C (350 to 375 °F).

Long common in commercial kitchens, household models now available have become increasingly prevalent.

Deep frying has become well known in the United States, from frying sticks of butter to Twinkies, but the method can be traced back to Roman times.

== Features ==
Deep fryers generally have a basket to lower the food into the oil tank and raise it when the food has finished cooking. Fryer baskets purchased separately are not standardized and when selected, need to fit into the deep fryer. There are timers and alarms, automatic devices to raise and lower the basket into and out of the oil, ventilation systems to exhaust frying odors from the kitchen, an oil filtration system or chemical treatment to improve the re-usability of the same amount of oil, and mechanical or electronic temperature controls that save energy and prevent fires by continuously sensing and adjusting the temperature of the oil.

== Construction ==
The modern commercial fryer has improved energy efficiency, resulting from better heat transfer systems. Commercial fryers with infrared heating or convection heating are efficient, but often expensive. Infrared heating uses a radiant heat transfer process and convection heating operates through air circulating, while standard fryers utilize hot combustion gases. Most standard fryers are very hot, so they should be handed carefully. The most common fryer models are electric and gas fryers.

Electric restaurant fryers are popular in counter top models, because of their mobility and easy installation. They lose less heat than gas fryers, because their heating elements are immersed in the oil and have a faster temperature recovery time between frying cycles. Gas fryers heat up more quickly and to a higher cooking temperature than electric fryers. They can be powered by either natural gas or propane, both of which are generally less expensive energy sources than electricity. This makes gas power especially popular in floor model fryers. Commercial fryers are generally available in mild steel or stainless steel. Stainless steel is less likely to corrode or stain than mild steel. Mild steel also expands under heat, which may damage the welds over time. Because of this, stainless steel fryers often come with a much longer warranty than mild steel fryers.

Some commercial fryers have a "cold zone" at the bottom of the fry pot. Food particles such as breading crumbs, loose batter, or small broken fragments sink into this zone, whose temperature is kept below that of the bulk oil so that they will not taint it by burning. A tube-style fry pot has a large cold zone because the tubes are slightly above the bottom of the vat, leaving generous space for cooler oil and crumbs. This is particularly useful for cooking heavily breaded foods (such as a blooming onion). A tube-style fry pot is more difficult to clean than an open fry pot, but the tubes allow easy access to the heat source. Tube fryers are often less expensive than their open fry pot counterparts.

Open fry pots have an external heat source, which makes them easier to clean and affords better access to the oil, but they generally offer a smaller cold zone, so food particles could pollute the flavor of the oil. However, these fryers work very well for lightly breaded foods. Flat-bottomed restaurant fryers (another type of open fry pot fryer) can also be difficult to clean and have no cold zone, but they are highly effective for frying dough. Flat-bottom fryer pots may also be used with a batter trapping insert that keeps loose batter from quickly scorching on the bottom where the heat is applied normally. A batter trap can also help keep loose batter from being stirred up in the oil and adhering to subsequent batches of food in order to make foods taste better and extend the cooking oil's usability.

Some domestic fryers incorporate an angled motorized rotary basket that circulates its contents through the hot oil. This design reduces the amount of oil required to roughly half compared to a more traditionally designed fryer. Domestic fryers are generally much smaller than their commercial counterparts and typically have a capacity of two to four liters.

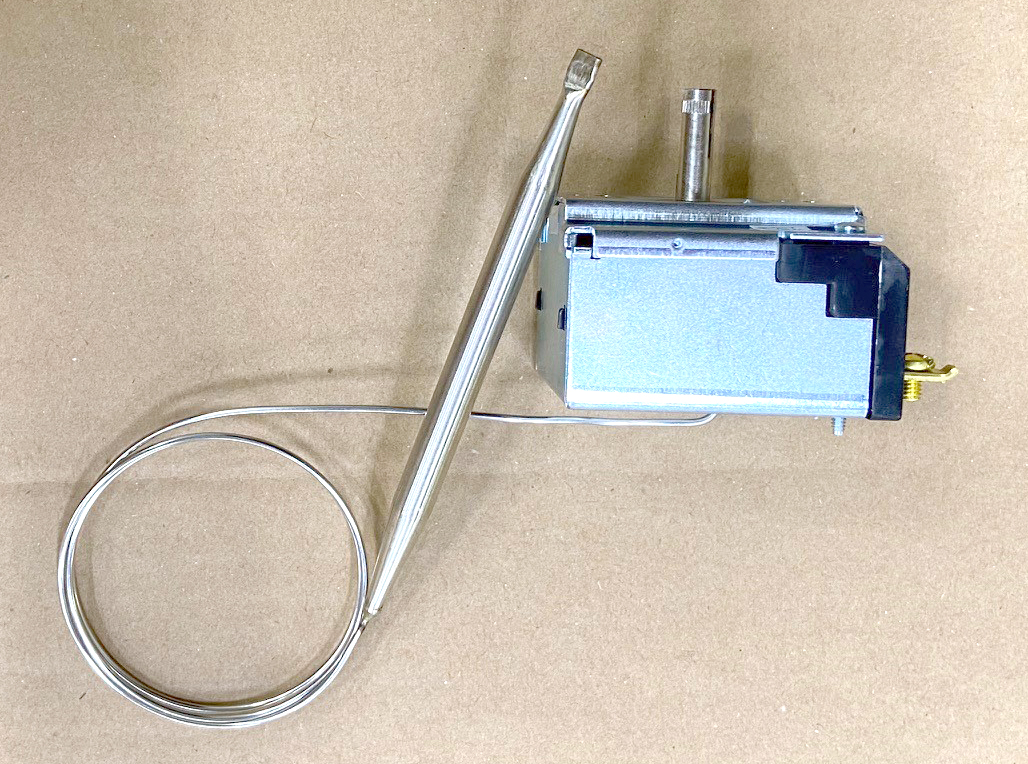
PECO T125 Temperature Control

== Temperature controls ==
Modern electric deep fryers invariably have thermostats. Without them the deep fryer needs to be watched consistently to ensure safety. Some modern fryers have an automatic shutoff control, in case the temperature gets too high. It is a good idea to use a separate or external thermometer, even if the unit has temperature controls, in case there is a malfunction.

== Oil filtration ==
An oil filtration system, chemical treatment, or absorbent powder (diatomaceous earth or synthetic magnesium silicates) all help remove tiny food particles that are not always visible. Using these systems doubles the life of the oil. Oil filtration systems can sometimes be purchased as an enclosed part of the fryer to avoid involving employees in the somewhat dangerous process of filtering the oil with an exterior system. Many restaurants use a portable oil filtration system to transport waste oil to a disposal area. However, even old oil is not completely useless. There are ways (involving other chemicals and machinery) to "recycle" old oil as biodiesel that can power diesel vehicles. Bio-diesel increases energy security resulting in many environmental benefits and even helping decrease greenhouse emissions. Pouring used oil, such as fats and grease, down the drain should be avoided, as this can cause food build up and clogged pipes, restricting the flow of liquids. This often results in costly restoration and cleaning.

== Accessories ==
Deep fryer accessories are products that are designed to improve the process of frying. A typical accessory of a deep fryer is the frying basket, which holds items to be fried and lets users take the food out of the fryer without using other tools. A skimmer is a screen (either coarse, medium, or fine) attached to a handle and used to remove food from the fryer. A thermometer is an essential accessory of a deep fryer because the temperature is critical to get the best-tasting food and ensure that the food is cooked to an appropriate temperature. To make sure the fryer itself stays in good condition, a cleaning solution is required, while a pump and filter can help to keep the oil clean. A fryer cleanout rod may be used to dislodge breading and other particles that have fallen off food and into the fryer. Cleaning brushes help to scrape away burnt bits of food from the sides and bottom of the fryer without damaging it.

== Automated deep fryers ==
The automated deep fryer has a different system that incorporates a single basket unit or double basket unit, which could be useful in loading, cooking, and serving food. The refrigerated storage compartment has a portion controller and dispenser, a separate cooking chamber having a frying vessel. Most automated deep fryers include an air filtration system which gets rid of the greasy smell of fried foods. The system additionally incorporates a microprocessor controller. Some automated deep fryer have an automated feature to ensure that the food is cooked consistently at the correct temperature and for the correct amount of time.

== Fire risks and personal safety ==
Since cooking foods at high temperatures in order to kill bacteria and pathogens is required, cautionary measures need to be taken into consideration. One of these precautions is the use of water and other solutions around deep fryers because water or ice that meets hot oils is likely to gurgle, splash, and bubble onto nearby surfaces or objects. In fact, the use of water or ice with hot oil can cause the water to evaporate at that high temperature leading to severe bodily injury or heated explosions. This is commonly referred to as the flash point and should always be avoided. It is always best to use a chemical agent like a fire extinguisher or cover the oil with a non-porous object like a metal lid or platter instead of liquids like water. Another precaution to consider when using a deep fat fryer to make sure that the oil does not overflow when food items are placed into the fryer and that the food item can be completely submerged to ensure even cooking, especially for large objects like a turkey. If the oil meets flames, from stove top burners and other sources, the results can be life-threatening like heated or gaseous oils that can explode nearby workstations while causing wall and ceiling fires. Another factor that can cause oil fires is the environment surrounding the deep fryer such as keeping the work area clear of objects and placing hot oil containers/fryers on smooth surfaces so that they do not spill. Furthermore, carbon monoxide can be created from deep-frying and little ventilation/air flow can cause people in the area to be poisoned, which is especially dangerous, so carbon monoxide detectors should be maintained in working order.

== See also ==
- Chip pan
- List of cooking appliances
- List of deep fried foods
- Sautéing
- Vacuum fryer
- Air fryer
