= Tewitfield =

Hamlet in Lancashire, England

Coordinates: 54.156°N 2.736°W

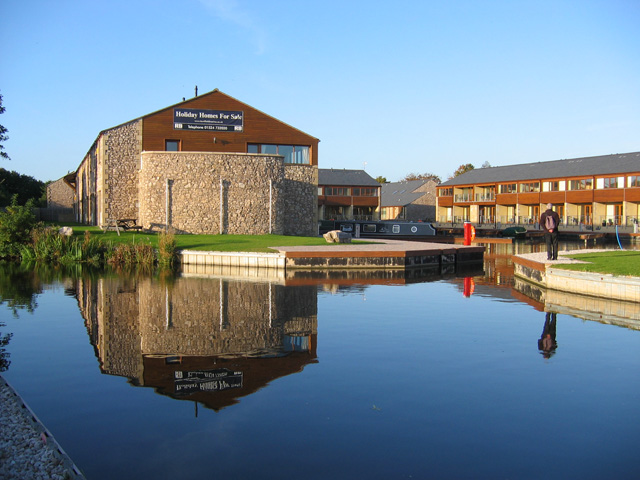
- Tewitfield Marina, Lancaster Canal

- Location in the City of Lancaster district Location within Lancashire
- OS grid reference: SD520736
- Civil parish: Priest Hutton
- District: Lancaster
- Shire county: Lancashire
- Region: North West
- Country: England
- Sovereign state: United Kingdom
- Post town: CARNFORTH
- Postcode district: LA6
- Dialling code: 01524
- Police: Lancashire
- Fire: Lancashire
- Ambulance: North West
- UK Parliament: Morecambe and Lunesdale

Tewitfield is a hamlet in Lancashire, England, near Borwick and Carnforth, and in the parish of Priest Hutton. The word "tewit" is a name for the bird better known as the lapwing.

== Canal and locks ==
Tewitfield Locks is the current terminus of the navigable Lancaster Canal, and the furthest north point on navigable inland waterways in England and Wales. The Inland Waterways Association includes Tewitfield Marina as one of the locations in its "Silver Paddle Challenge" which encourages boaters to "Explore the far flung reaches of the network".

The Lancaster Canal Trust, the Northern Reaches Restoration Group and others are campaigning for the re-opening of the Canal to its original terminus at Kendal, Cumbria. This would involve, among other things, refurbishing the seven locks situated just north of the hamlet, which are without gates and functioning only as weirs. The locks are grade II listed.

== Chapel ==
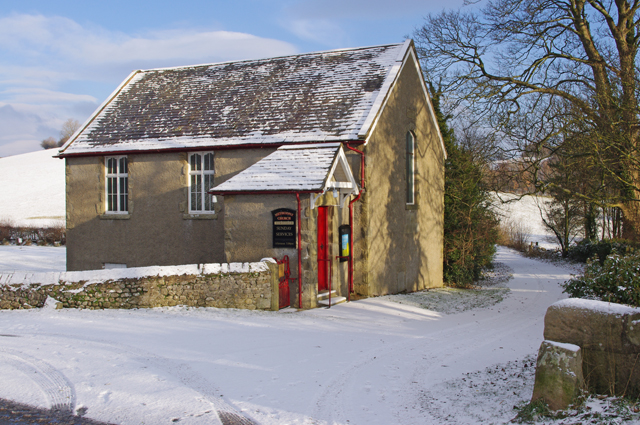
Tewitfield Methodist Chapel in 2010

Tewitfield Methodist chapel may have been built as an ale-house for workers building the canal, and in 2017 became used a base for volunteers restoring the canal.
