= Capernwray Dive Centre =

Flooded quarry in Lancashire, England, used as a recreational dive site

Coordinates: 54.1363°N 2.7228°W

Capernwray Dive Centre is a large flooded former quarry, presently operated as an inland scuba diving site and training centre, near the village of Over Kellet, Lancashire, England.

== History ==
Formerly a 22-acre limestone quarry, after the end of its commercial use it flooded and was later converted into a dive centre.

== Diving centre ==
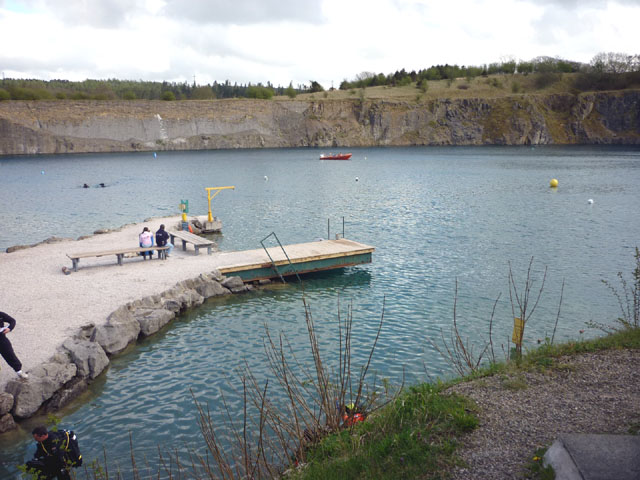
Diving platform

Capernwray has a range of depths to 80 feet (24 m). There is a small dive shop, with a filling station providing air and nitrox as well as a licensed restaurant. There are two sets of training platforms with levels at 2 metres (6 ft 7 in) and 6 metres (20 ft). As of 2010, the centre received around 30,000 visitors per year.

As well as being stocked with fish including trout, perch and at least two sturgeon, the underwater attractions include:

- Numerous boats, including the former minesweeper HMS Podsnap
- A medium range, twin turboprop airliner (a Hawker Siddeley HS 748), a Cessna 150 light aeroplane and two helicopters
- A vidor diving bell
- ISO shipping container
- Two plastic horses
- A small yellow submarine in the style of Thunderbird 4
- A devil statue
- Two plastic pigs
- Various garden gnomes
