= Borwick Hall =

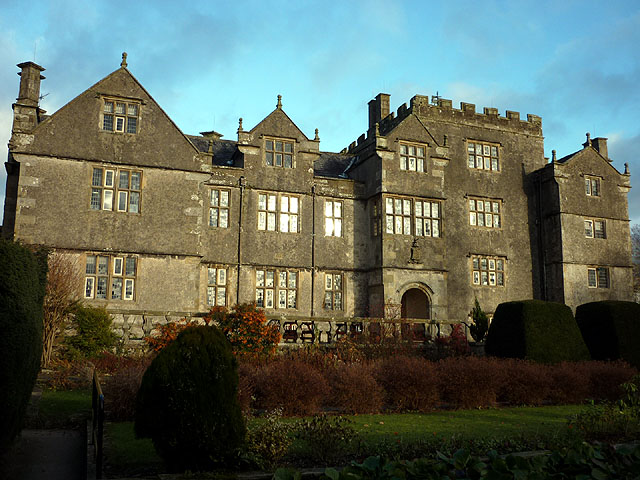

- Location within the City of Lancaster district

General information
- Type: Manor House
- Location: Borwick Lane, Borwick, Lancashire, England
- Coordinates: 54.15°N 2.73°W
- Owner: Lancashire County Council

Listed Building – Grade I
- Designated: 4 October 1967
- Reference no.: 1071914

Borwick Hall is a 16th-century manor house at Borwick, Lancashire, England. It is a Grade I listed building and is now used as a residential outdoor education and conference centre by Lancashire County Council.

== History ==
The manor of Borwick is mentioned in the Domesday Book as being part of the estates of Roger of Poitou but the oldest parts of the building still in existence date from the 14th century when a pele tower was built on the site. It was bought c. 1590 by Roger Bindlosse.

The tower was extended to a manor house by Roger in the early 1590s before he died in 1595. His son Robert inherited and was appointed High Sheriff of Lancashire in 1615. Robert's son Sir Francis Bindlosse predeceased him and so the estate passed to Francis's eldest son, Robert, who was created a baronet in 1641 and was elected MP for Lancashire in 1660. He also served twice as High Sheriff. He built a private Oratory on the estate. On his death in 1688 with no male heir the baronetcy became extinct and the estate passed to his only daughter, Cecilia, who had married William Standish. On her death there were again no male heirs and the estate passed to a daughter who had married Thomas Strickland of the Sizergh family. The Scottish soldier Charlie MacDougal is believed to have died in the grounds in 1745 following the infighting between the Scots returning from England with Bonnie Prince Charlie. The Stricklands sold the Hall in 1854 for £28,000 to Col. Marton of Capernwray.

By the early 19th century the Hall was falling into disrepair and was only repaired in the 1910s, when it was leased to music critic John Alexander Fuller Maitland on the specific condition that he restore the building.

After the Second World War during which the hall was used as a military base, the estate was sold to Lancashire Youth Clubs Association and later passed into the ownership of Lancashire County Council, which uses it as a residential centre for outdoor activities, making use of its grounds and offering canoeing on the adjacent canal.

The hall was used for exterior shots for the children's TV programme The Ghosts of Motley Hall which ran on Granada TV from 1976 to 1978. The hall stood in for the fictional Motley Hall, built in 1577, home to the Uproar family over the centuries, but now home to a group of ghosts from different eras.

The hall is not generally open to the public, but was open to visitors for two days during the 2025 Heritage Open Days.

== Construction ==
The house is built of stone with a slate roof. It includes a four-storey 14th-century peel tower and a five-bay 1595 expansion to the north west (left, as seen from the front); behind and to the right of the peel tower are extensions thought to predate 1595. A courtyard behind the house has an open "spinning gallery", a common feature in the Lake District, of which Pevsner says "no other example has been identified in a high status building or one so far s[outh]." The great hall has some 17th-century wooden panelling, brought from elsewhere by Maitland in his restoration of 1911, when he also remodelled the first-floor great chamber as a library. Pevsner describes the building as "highly picturesque" and says that "The style and date are close to Levens Hall ... though Borwick is the more architecturally accomplished."

The house, gatehouse and stables have all been grade I listed since 1967, while the garden balustrade, barn and cottages, and walls and gate have been grade II listed since 1983.

== See also ==
- Grade I listed buildings in Lancashire
- Listed buildings in Borwick
