= Diving air compressor =

Machine used to compress breathing air for use by underwater divers

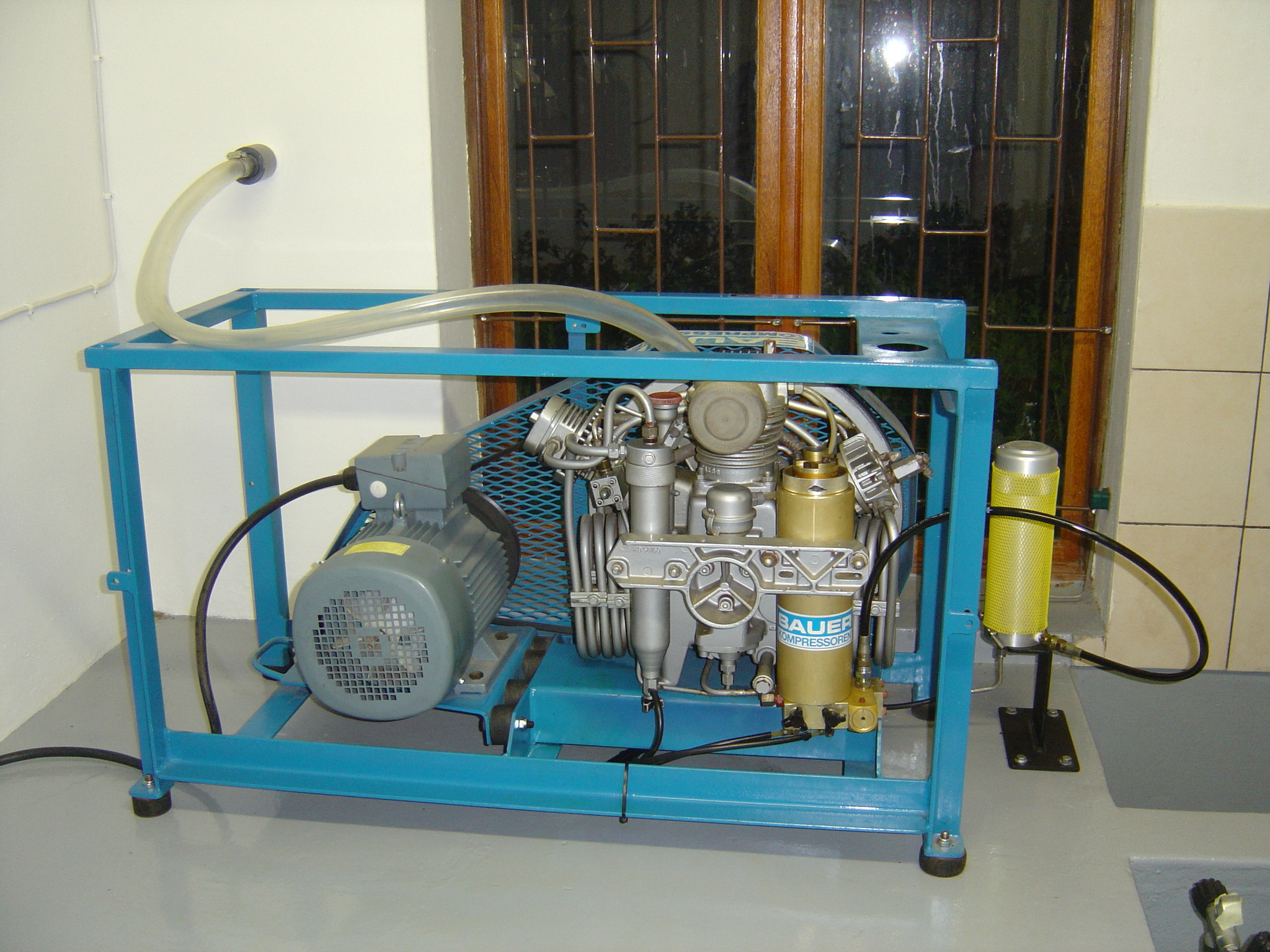
- A small stationary high pressure diving air compressor installation
- Other names: Breathing air compressor
- Uses: Filling dive cylinders (high pressure); Provision of surface supplied breathing air (low pressure)

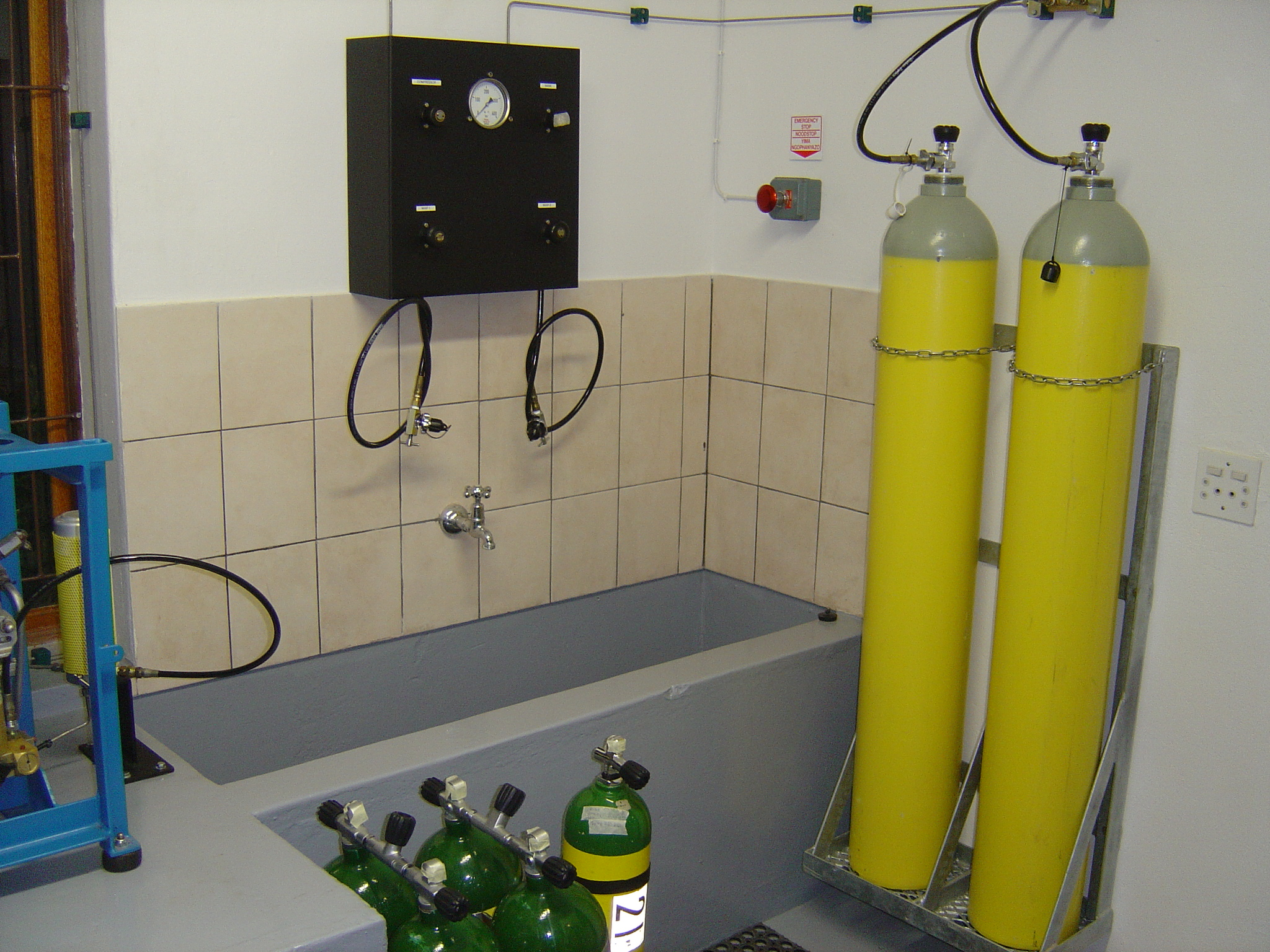
A small scuba filling and blending station supplied by a compressor and storage bank

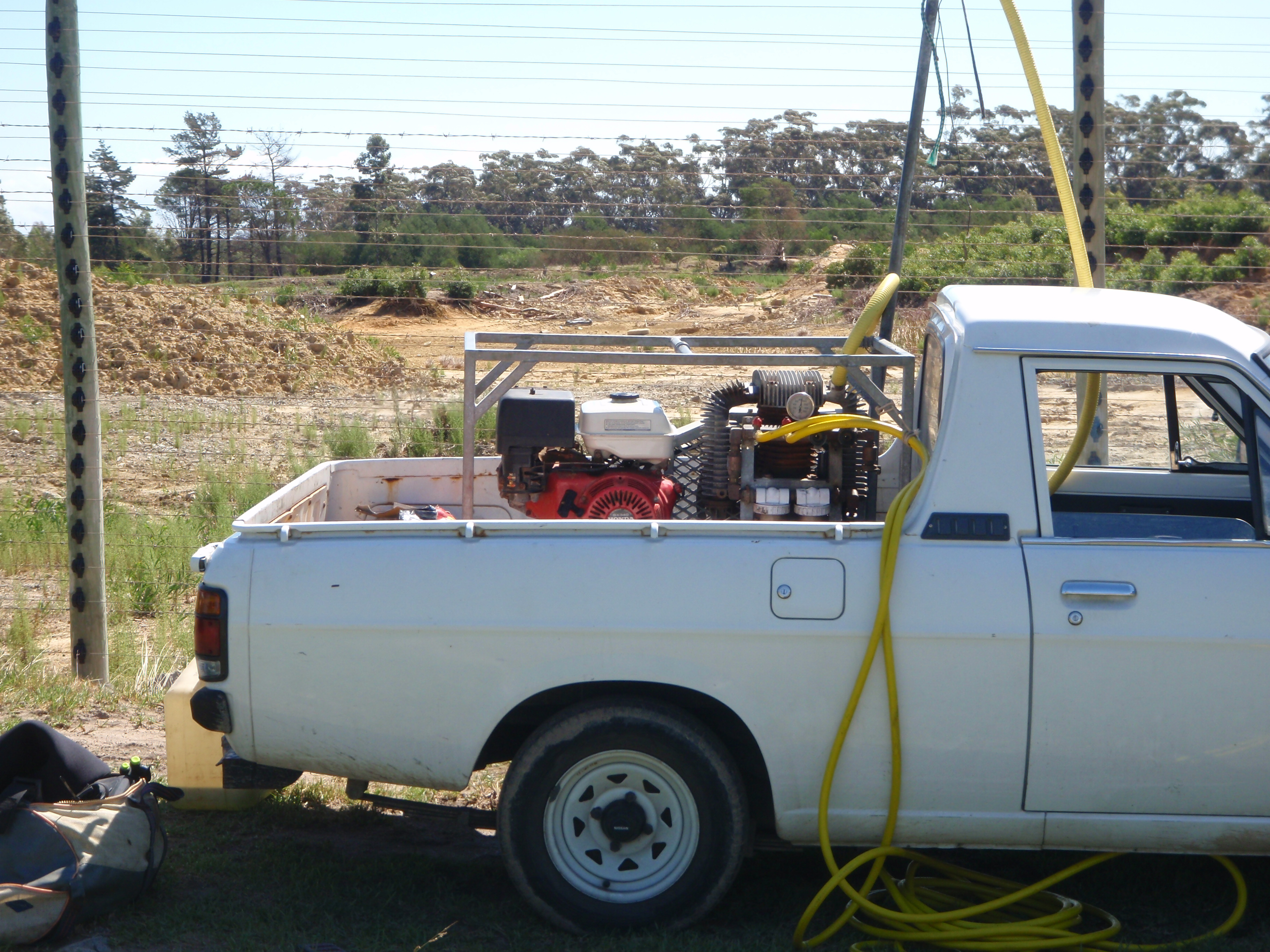
A low pressure breathing air compressor used for surface supplied diving at the surface control point

A diving air compressor is a breathing air compressor that can provide breathing air directly to a surface-supplied diver, or fill diving cylinders with high-pressure air pure enough to be used as a hyperbaric breathing gas. A low pressure diving air compressor usually has a delivery pressure of up to 30 bar, which is regulated to suit the depth of the dive. A high pressure diving compressor has a delivery pressure which is usually over 150 bar, and is commonly between 200 and 300 bar. The pressure is limited by an overpressure valve which may be adjustable.

Most high pressure diving air compressors are oil-lubricated multi-stage piston compressors with inter-stage cooling and condensation traps. Low pressure compressors may be single or two-stage, and may use other mechanisms besides reciprocating pistons. When the inlet pressure is above ambient pressure the machine is known as a gas booster pump.

The output air must usually be filtered to control purity to a level appropriate for breathing gas at the relevant diving depth. Breathing gas purity standards are published to ensure that the gas is safe. It may also be necessary to filter the intake air, to remove particulates, and in some environments it may be necessary to remove carbon dioxide, using a scrubber. The quality of the inlet air is critical to the quality of the product as many types of impurity are impracticable to remove after compression. Condensed water vapour is usually removed between stages after cooling the compressed air to improve efficiency of compression.

High pressure compressors may be set up with large storage cylinders and a filling panel for portable cylinders, and may be associated with gas blending equipment. Low pressure diving compressors usually supply compressed air to a gas distribution panel via a volume tank, which helps compensate for fluctuations in supply and demand. Air from the gas panel is supplied to the diver through the diver's umbilical.

== Machinery ==
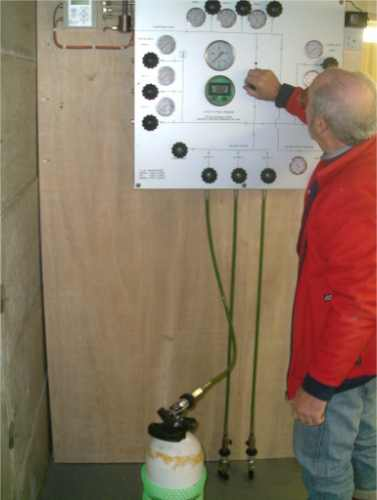
Filling a cylinder from the panel

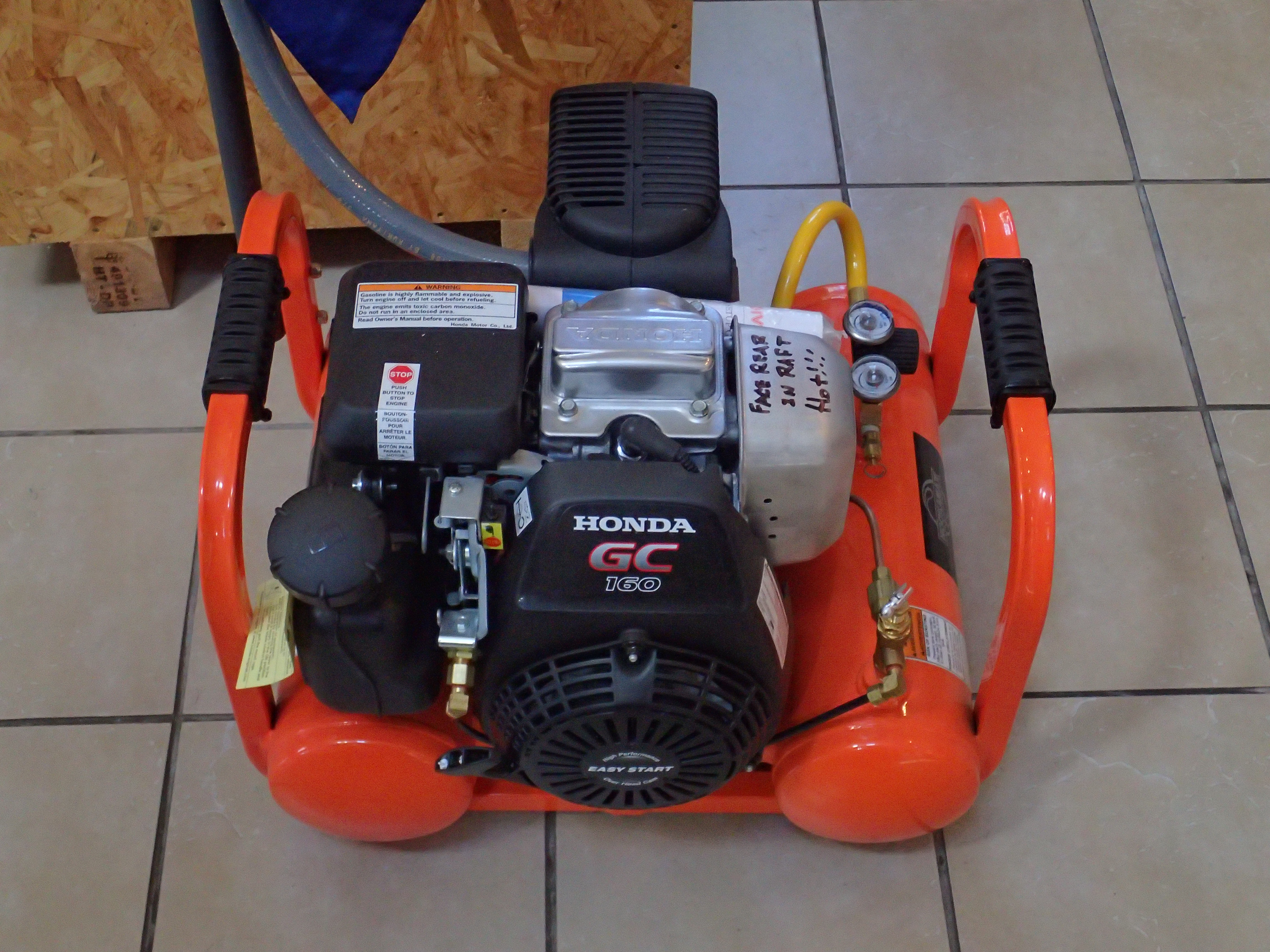
Low pressure breathing air compressor intended for use with airline diving equipment

High pressure diving compressors are generally three- or four-stage-reciprocating air compressors that are lubricated with a high-grade mineral or synthetic compressor oil free of toxic additives (a few use ceramic-lined cylinders with O-rings, not piston rings, requiring no lubrication). Oil-lubricated compressors must only use lubricants specified by the compressor's manufacturer as suitable for use with breathing air. Special filters are used to clean the air of most residual oil and water (see "Air purity").

Smaller compressors are often splash lubricated - the oil is splashed around in the crankcase by the impact of the crankshaft and connecting rods - but larger compressors are likely to have pressurized lubrication using an oil pump which supplies the oil to critical areas through pipes and passages in the castings. Most oil lubricated compressors will have a wet sump at the bottom of the crankcase, and require the oil level to be within limits indicated by a sight glass or dipstick for proper lubrication. The compressor should also be level within the manufacturer's specification while operating. These constraints ensure that the lubricant is in the right place for either the moving parts to contact it for splash lubrication, or for reliable suction to the oil pump. Failure to comply with these specifications can lead to damage to the compressor due to excessive friction and overheating, and contamination of the breathing air by toxic breakdown products of the lubricants.

The compression process helps remove water from the gas, making it dry, which is good for reducing corrosion in diving cylinders and freezing of diving regulators, but contributes towards dehydration, a factor in decompression sickness, in divers who breathe the gas.

Low pressure diving compressors are usually single stage compressors as the delivery pressure is relatively low.

== Air purity ==
The compressed air output by the compressor must be filtered to make it fit for use as a breathing gas. Periodically, the air produced by a compressor must be tested to ensure it meets air purity standards. Frequency of testing, contaminants that must be analysed, and the allowable limits vary between applications and jurisdictions. The following impurities may be checked for:

- Carbon dioxide –
- Carbon monoxide – A gas that is present in the exhaust gas of internal combustion engines, including those often used to drive compressors. It also comes from the breakdown of lubricating oil when compressors run too hot. Carbon monoxide is odorless, colorless, and tasteless. It is deadly even in small quantities, because it readily binds with the hemoglobin in red blood cells and thus destroys the blood's ability to carry oxygen. Breathing air compressors must be carefully designed and placed so that the compressor's intake is located in fresh air well away and upstream from any engine exhaust.
- Lubricating-oil vapour – Oil, which must be used to lubricate the compressor's internal parts, can be harmful if it contaminates the breathing gas and is inhaled as a mist. Petroleum-based oils cannot be absorbed and metabolized by the body and will coat the internal surfaces of the lungs, causing a condition known as lipoid pneumonia and leading to asphyxiation and death. For this reason, compressors must be carefully designed and maintained to ensure that oil contamination of the breathing gas is within safe limits. Oils used should be approved by the compressor manufacturer and rated as safe for breathing air compressors. A range of mineral based and synthetic oils are supplied by several lubricant manufacturers for this application.
- Total hydrocarbons –
- Nitrogen dioxide –
- Odor and taste –
- Solid particles –
- Water vapor – Allowable limits for moisture content depend on pressure: Moist air is not harmful to the diver and reduces dehydration, so is acceptable in low pressure breathing air for surface supply in much higher concentration than for storage in high pressure cylinders, where corrosion due to condensation is a problem, and where regulator freezing may occur.

== Filtration ==
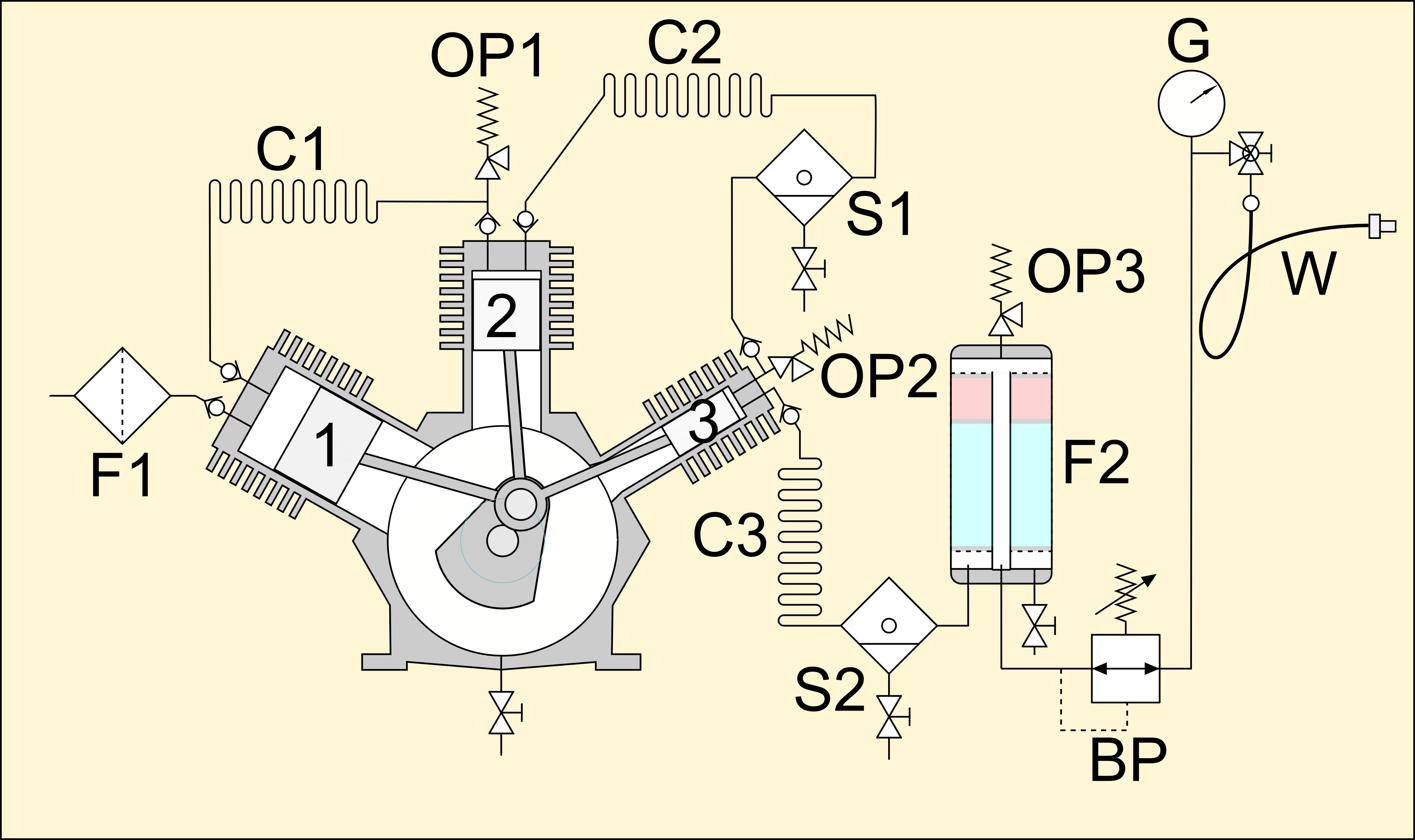
Schematic diagram of a three-stage high pressure breathing air compressor: F1: intake filter; 1: first stage piston; C1: first stage cooling coil; OP1: overpressure valve; 2: second stage piston; C2: second stage cooling coil; S1: second stage water separator; OP2: overpressure valve; 3: third stage piston; C3: third stage cooling coil; S2: third stage water separator; F2: main filter stack; OP3: overpressure valve; BP: back-pressure valve; G: pressure gauge; W: filling whip

Filters remove:

- Solid particles from intake air, using paper filters
- Water, using water separators, silica gel, activated alumina or a molecular sieve
- Oil, using activated carbon or a molecular sieve
- Carbon monoxide, using a catalyst (Hopcalite)
- Carbon dioxide, using a prefilter (scrubber) may be necessary depending on intake air quality.

=== Low pressure filtration ===
The intake air for a high pressure compressor should be clean and have a low carbon dioxide content. Removal of particulate contamination is usually by a paper type dust filter at the first stage intake. Carbon dioxide can be removed by a scrubber if necessary. Clean fresh air does not need to be scrubbed at present, but inner city air may have an excessively high carbon dioxide content, and standard atmospheric air carbon dioxide content is slowly increasing. Carbon dioxide scrubbing requires moisture for the absorbent material to work effectively, and moist air is undesirable for the other filter media, so carbon dioxide scrubbing is often removed by a pre-filter system before the air is compressed.

=== High pressure filtration systems ===
When the air is compressed, the partial pressure of water vapour is proportionately increased. The air is also heated by compression, and when cooled between stages in the inter-cooler coils, the relative humidity increases, and when it exceeds 100% will tend to condense out onto the surface of the tubes and as droplets carried by the air-stream. The air from the inter-cooler coils is led into the large diameter vertical axis tube of a separator, where it changes direction by about 90 degrees and is slowed down considerably. When the airflow changes direction towards the outlet at the top of the separator casing, the denser droplets have a tendency to hit the walls and coalesce into a film, which will flow downwards to the bottom of the separator and collect there where it can be periodically discharged through a drain valve. This reduces the water content of the outlet air, which is then compressed again in the next stage cylinder, cooled again, and the water that condenses out is again removed by the next separator.

After final stage separation the relatively droplet free but humid air passes through the filter to remove yet more water, and any other contaminants that the filter media will adsorb. The efficiency of dehumidification and filtration depends on significant compression and limited flow velocity, which requires back-pressure at the final stage outlet to resist flow when the filling pressure is low. The back-pressure valve provided in the outlet from the final filter stack affects how effectively the filter works.

The final stage of air treatment is filtration of residual moisture, oil and hydrocarbons, and where necessary catalytic conversion of carbon monoxide. All of these depend on sufficient time in contact with the filter media, known as "dwell time", so either the filter must have a long air path or the air must flow slowly. Slow air flow is easily achieved by high compression, so filtration works best at or near the working output pressure of the compressor, and this is achieved by the back-pressure valve, which only allows air to flow out of the filter above the set pressure.

The filter system comprises one or more pressure vessels known as filter towers with either prepacked cartridge or loose filter media, a back pressure valve, one or more pressure gauges, and a coalescing separator. After passing through the final intercooler coil the compressed air passes through separators to mechanically remove condensed water and oil droplets, after which other contaminants re removed in the filters by chemical bonding, absorption and catalysis. The first filter medium is desiccant, as water contamination can reduce the effectiveness of some of the other media. Next is the carbon monoxide converting catalyst (if used), then activated carbon, and finally a particulate filter, which will also catch dust from the filter media. The ratio of desiccant to activated carbon will be somewhere around 70/30.

The ability to remove impurities from the air passing through the filtration media is largely dependent on how long the air remains in contact with the media while passing through the filter stack, known as dwell time. A longer dwell time in the filter is an effective way of increasing contact time, and this is proportional to the pressure of the air in the filter housing. By using a back pressure valve the air always takes approximately the same time to pass through the filter and filtration is consistent (assuming a consistent operating speed). The back-pressure valve is usually set to near the working pressure of the compressor to ensure that the air is compressed sufficiently for the filters to work effectively.

Delivered air should have a dew point lower than the operational temperature of the cylinder, which is generally above 0 °C when immersed, but can be colder during transport. Air temperature is also decreased during expansion through the regulator when in use, and when this temperature is low enough for the condensate to freeze, it can lock up the moving parts of the regulator and cause a free flow, known as internal icing. Correct back-pressure also provides relatively even loading of the compressor stages, which reduces vibration caused by imbalance, and extends the compressor service life.

The activated carbon filter medium works best when dry, so it is usually loaded into the filter stack so that the air will first flow through the desiccant media, commonly molecular sieve. Hopcalite catalyst will convert carbon monoxide into carbon dioxide, but requires very dry air—relative humidity must be below 50 per cent—so hopcalite is loaded downstream from the desiccant. A carbon dioxide absorbent may be loaded downstream of the hopcalite.

==== Filtration media ====
Desiccants are intended to absorb water vapour. Desiccant media used in HP breathing air filters include: activated alumina, silica gel, sorbead, and molecular sieve. Some grades of molecular sieve can absorb up to 23% of its own weight in water, can produce dew points of −75 °C (−103 °F), and have additional capacities for absorbing hydrocarbons, carbon dioxide, and other organics, and function at up to 49 °C (120 °F)120 degrees Fahrenheit.

Manganese dioxide based catalysts (Monoxycon and Hopcalite 300) are used to oxidize carbon monoxide into much less toxic carbon dioxide. This is important if there is a risk of carbon monoxide contamination as it is highly toxic. The air entering the catalyst layer must be dry (dew point of around−46 °C (−51 °F) –50 degrees), as moisture neutralizes the catalyst. After the catalyst, an absorbent can be used to remove the CO_{2}.

Activated carbon absorbs both condensable and gaseous hydrocarbons, and is effective in removing odours, organic compounds, and halogenated solvents.

== Compressor balance and the backpressure valve ==
The last part of the compressor gas circuit is the back-pressure valve. This is a spring-loaded valve that opens to allow flow of air only after the pressure reaches the set pressure. It is usually set to a pressure close to the working pressure of the compressor, and has two basic functions. Firstly it ensures that after a short starting period, all of the compressor stages are operating at their designed discharge pressures, so that the loads on the pistons are steady and evenly distributed round the crankshaft. This is the loading at which the compressor is balanced at the designed running speed. When the pressure in any cylinder is different from the nominal pressure, the loads will be unbalanced and the compressor will vibrate more than when balanced, and the shaft bearings will be more severely loaded and will wear faster. During start-up the compressor first builds up pressure on the first stage, and is unbalanced, with a greater load on that cylinder's piston, and will vibrate more than normal, as there is no equivalent load on the other stage pistons, then pressure in the other stages builds up in sequence, until all cylinders are operating at their working pressures, the loads on all the pistons are similar, and the back-pressure valve starts to open to let the compressed gas flow to the distribution panel.

== Pressure ==
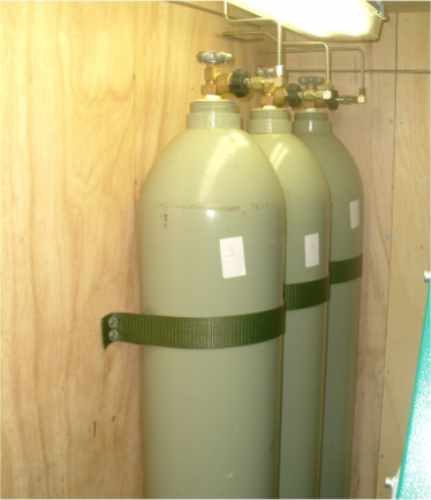
Air bank

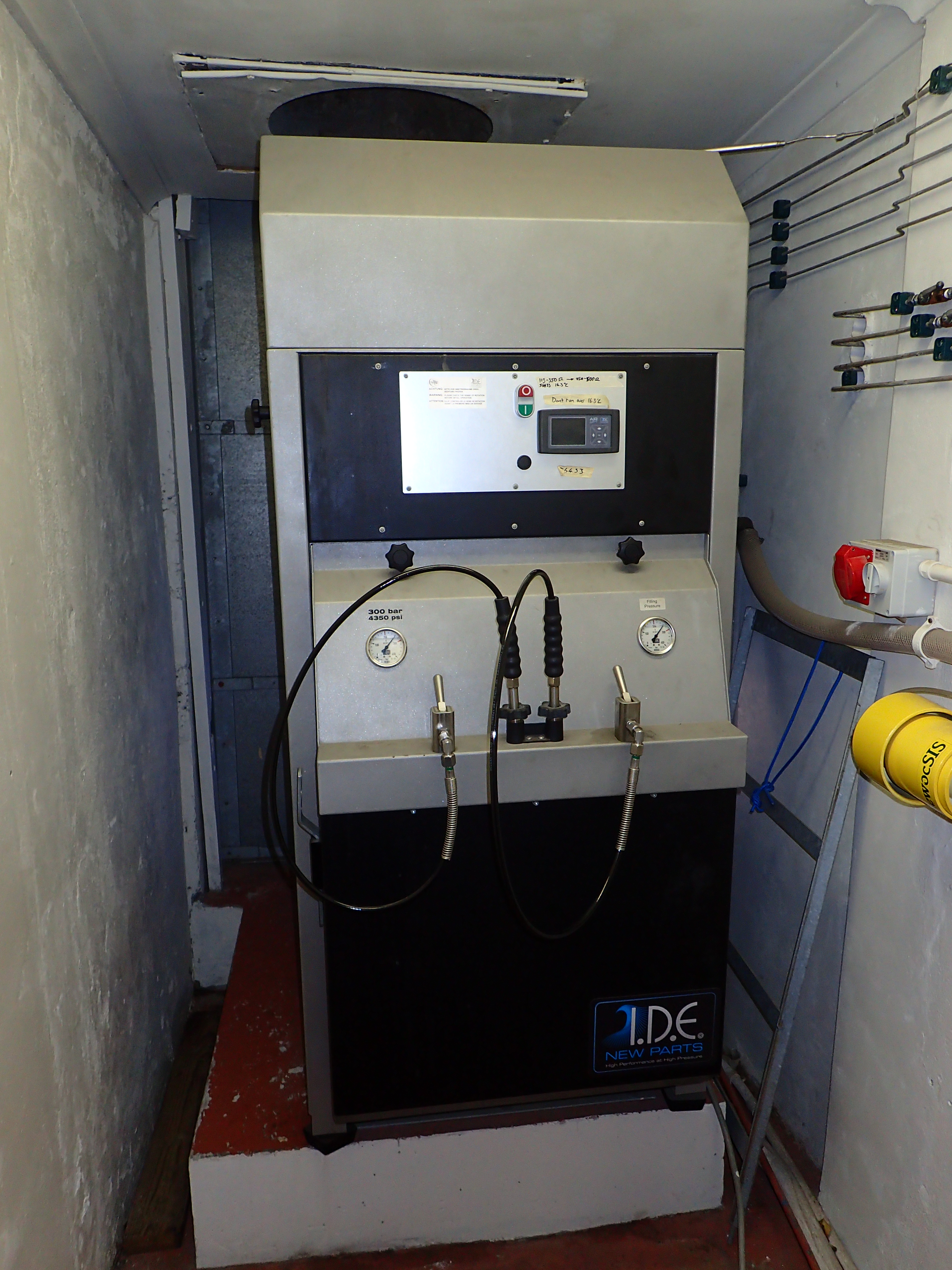
High pressure breathing air compressor installation

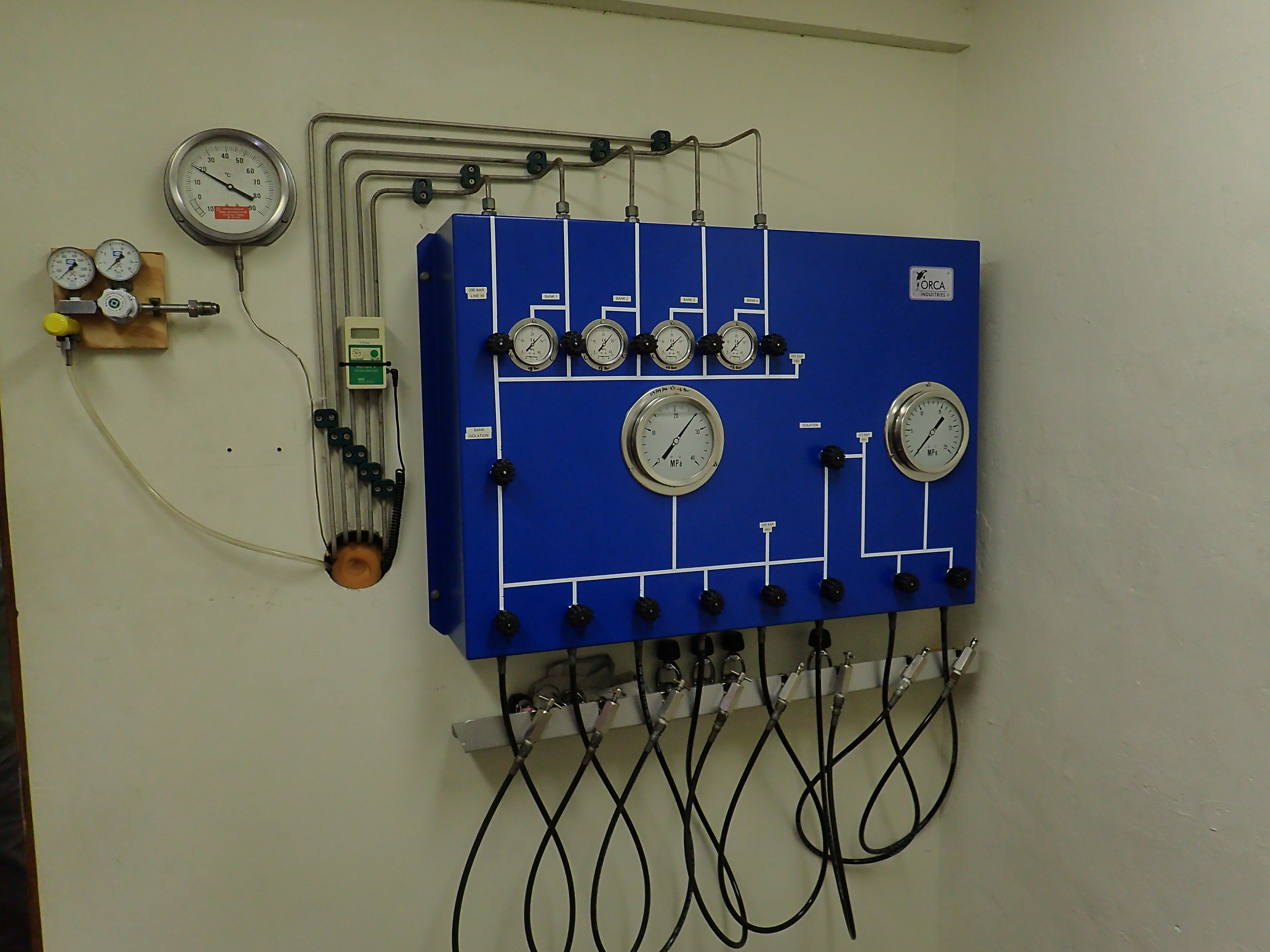
Breathing gas filling panel

Diving compressors generally fall into one of two categories: those used for surface-supplied diving and those used for filling scuba diving cylinders and surface-supply storage cylinders.

Surface-supplied air diving compressors are low-pressure and high-volume. They supply breathing air directly to a diver, through a gas control panel sometimes called a "rack" via a hose which is usually part of a group of hoses and cables called an "umbilical". Their output is generally between 6 and 20 bars (100 and 300 psi). These compressors must be sufficiently powerful to deliver gas at a sufficient pressure and volume for multiple divers working at depths of up to about 60 metres (200 ft). Delivery of up to 75 litres per minute per diver at depth may be needed.

Compressors used to fill scuba cylinders have a high delivery pressure and may have a low delivery volume. They are used to fill diving cylinders and storage cylinders or banks of storage cylinders. These compressors may be smaller and less powerful because the volume of gas they deliver is not so critical as it is not directly used by the diver; a lower volume compressor can be used to fill large storage cylinders during the periods when demand is low. This stored compressed air can be decanted into diving cylinders when needed. Common scuba diving cylinder pressures are 200 bar (2940 psi), 3000 psi (207 bar), 232 bar (3400 psi) and 300 bar (4500 psi).

== Heat of compression ==
When diving cylinders are filled the gas inside them warms as a result of adiabatic heating. When the gas cools by losing heat to the surroundings, the pressure will drop as described by the general gas equation and Gay-Lussac's law. Divers, to maximise their dive time, generally want their cylinders filled to their safe capacity, the working pressure. To provide the diver with a cylinder filled to the working pressure at the nominal temperature of 15 or 20 °C, the cylinder and gas must be kept cool when filling or filled to a pressure such that when it cools it is at the working pressure. This is known as the developed pressure for the filling temperature. Health and safety regulations and pressure vessel design standards may limit the working temperature of the cylinder, commonly to 65 °C, in which case the cylinder must be filled slowly enough to avoid exceeding the maximum working temperature.

Cylinders are often filled at a rate of less than 1 bar (100 kPa or 15 lbf/in²) per second to allow time for heat transfer to the surroundings to limit this increase in temperature. As a method to remove heat faster when filling the cylinder, some filling stations "wet fill" cylinders immersed in a bath of cold water. There is an increased risk of internal cylinder corrosion caused by moisture from the wet environment entering the cylinder due to contamination during connection of the filling hose during wet filling.

== The bank ==
Compressors may be connected to a bank of large, high-pressure cylinders to store compressed gas, for use at peak times. This allows a cheaper low-powered compressor, which is relatively slow at pumping gas, to fill the bank automatically during idle periods, storing a large volume of pressurized air so that a batch of cylinders can be filled more quickly at peak demand without being delayed by the slow-running compressor. In surface-supplied diving, high-pressure cylinder banks may be used as an emergency backup in case of primary compressor failure, or they may be used as the primary source of breathing gas, a system also known as "Scuba replacement".

== Filling diving cylinders ==
Cylinders may be filled directly from the compressor outlet, or from a filling manifold, via a flexible high-pressure hose with a filling valve and purge valve known as a filling whip. A pressure gauge is provided to monitor the pressure in the cylinder as it is filled. an overpressure valve or an electrical pressure-switch may be used to limit filling pressure if the compressor is set to a higher pressure than the developed working pressure of the cylinders to be filled.

== Gas blending ==
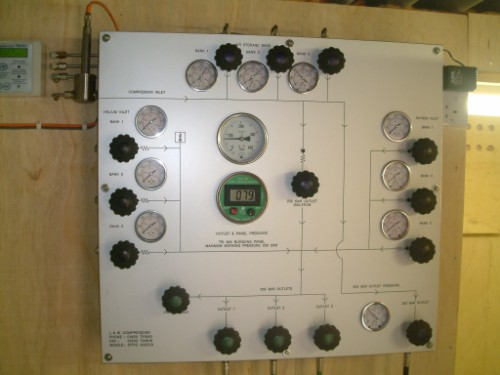
Gas blending panel

Compressors may be linked to a gas blending panel to make nitrox, trimix, heliair or heliox mixes. The panel controls the decanting of oxygen and helium from cylinders bought from commercial gas suppliers.

As it is not possible to decant to a diving cylinder from a storage cylinder that holds gas at a lower pressure than the diving cylinder, the expensive gas in low pressure storage cylinders is not easily consumed and may go to waste when the storage cylinder is returned to the supplier. The cascade system may be used with a bank of storage cylinders to economically consume these high cost gases so that the economically maximum gas is used from the bank. This involves filling a diving cylinder by first decanting from the bank cylinder with the lowest pressure that is higher than the diving cylinder's pressure and then from the next higher-pressure bank cylinder in succession until the diving cylinder is full. The system maximizes the use of low-pressure bank gas and minimizes the use of high-pressure bank gas.

Another method for scavenging expensive low pressure gases is to pump it with a gas booster pump such as a Haskel pump, or to add it to the intake air of a suitable compressor at atmospheric pressure in a mixer known as a blending stick.

== Operation ==
A diving air compressor operator may be required to be formally certified as competent to operate a diving air compressor and to fill high pressure cylinders. In other jurisdictions the operator may be required to be competent to use the equipment and externally examine cylinders for compliance, but there may be no formal licence or registration required. In yet other jurisdictions there may be no control at all. National and/or state occupational health and safety legislation will usually apply.

There are two basic aspects which may be considered: The health and safety of the operator, who operates hazardous equipment, and is exposed to mechanical and noise hazard from the compressor machinery, high pressure equipment, and cylinders, and the health and safety of the user of the breathing gas, who relies on the compressor operator for quality assurance.

== See also ==
- Booster pump – Machine to increase pressure of a fluid
