= St Cuthbert's Church, Over Kellet =

Coordinates: 54.1195°N 2.7319°W

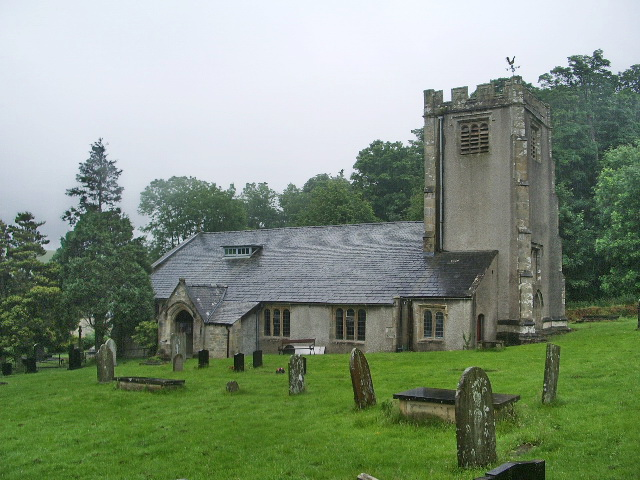
- St Cuthbert's Church, Over Kellet, from the north

- Location in the City of Lancaster district
- OS grid reference: SD 523,696
- Location: Over Kellet, Lancashire
- Country: England
- Denomination: Anglican
- Website: St Cuthbert, Over Kellet

History
- Status: Parish church
- Dedication: Saint Cuthbert

Architecture
- Functional status: Active
- Heritage designation: Grade II*
- Designated: 4 October 1967
- Architect(s): E. G. Paley, Austin and Paley (restorations)
- Architectural type: Church
- Style: Gothic, Gothic Revival

Specifications
- Materials: Pebbledashed rubble with sandstone dressings Slate roofs

Administration
- Province: York
- Diocese: Blackburn
- Archdeaconry: Lancaster
- Deanery: Tunstall
- Parish: Over Kellet

Clergy
- Vicar: interregnum

St Cuthbert's Church is in the village of Over Kellet, Lancashire, England. It is an active Anglican parish church in the deanery of Tunstall, the archdeaconry of Lancaster, and the diocese of Blackburn. The church is recorded in the National Heritage List for England as a designated Grade II* listed building.

== History ==
The earliest surviving parts of the church date from about 1200, but most of the structure is from the 16th century. It was restored in 1863–64 by the Lancaster architect E. G. Paley. During the restoration, the ceiling was removed, the chancel arch was reinstated, the east end was rebuilt, and the seating was increased from 260 to 295. The alterations cost £330 (equivalent to £40,000 in 2025). It was further restored in 1909 by the successors in Paley's practice, Austin and Paley; this included rebuilding of the eastern bay, and the addition of dormers.

== Architecture ==
=== Exterior ===
The church is constructed in pebbledashed rubble with sandstone dressings, and has slate roofs. Its architectural style is mainly late Perpendicular. The plan consists of a four-bay nave with a north porch, north and south aisles, a chancel, and a west tower. In the angle between the tower and the north aisle is a vestry. The tower has diagonal buttresses, and a battlemented parapet. It contains a west doorway, now blocked, a three-light west window, and three-light bell openings on all sides. Along the north aisles are three-light windows, and the vestry contains a two-light window. Along the south aisle are four two-light windows. The east window has three lights containing Perpendicular tracery.

=== Interior ===
Inside the church the arcades are carried on octagonal piers. There are box pews in the nave and the aisles. At the west end of the south aisle are the Royal arms of George III. The font in the north aisle is cylindrical and constructed of gritstone. There is another font in the south aisle dating from the 19th century. Also in the church are monuments dating from the 18th and 19th centuries. The stained glass in the east window was installed in 1868.

== External features ==
The churchyard contains the war graves of a soldier of World War I, and a Royal Air Force officer of World War II.

== See also ==
- Grade II* listed buildings in Lancashire
- Listed buildings in Over Kellet
- List of ecclesiastical works by E. G. Paley
- List of ecclesiastical works by Austin and Paley (1895–1914)
