= Listed buildings in Over Kellet =

Over Kellet is a civil parish in Lancaster, Lancashire, England. It contains 35 buildings that are recorded in the National Heritage List for England as designated listed buildings. Of these, two are at Grade II*, the middle grade, and the others are at Grade II, the lowest grade. The parish contains the villages of Over Kellet and Capernwray, and is otherwise rural. Most of the listed buildings are houses, farmhouses and associated structures. The Lancaster Canal passes through the parish, and two bridges crossing it are listed. The other listed buildings include a church, a chapel, two country houses, a public house, a derelict tower, and a village cross.

== Key ==
Grade	Criteria
II*	Particularly important buildings of more than special interest
II	Buildings of national importance and special interest

== Buildings ==
Name and location	Photograph	Date	Notes	Grade
St Cuthbert's Church; 54.11956°N 2.73184°W		c. 1200	The oldest part of the church is in the south arcade, with most of it dating probably from the 16th century in late Perpendicular style. It was restored in 1863–64 by E. G. Paley, and again in 1909 by Austin and Paley. The church is in pebbledashed rubble with sandstone dressings, and has slate roofs. It consists of a nave, a north porch, aisles, a chancel, and a west tower with diagonal buttresses and a battlemented parapet.	II*
Brookside and Brookside Cottage; 54.12357°N 2.73863°W	—	17th century	The older part is the cottage, the house being added to the left in the early 19th century. They are in sandstone, the house with a slate roof, and the cottage roof is in stone-slate. They are in two storeys, with three taller bays on the left and two on the right. The 17th-century windows are mullioned, and those from the 19th century are sashes.	II
Old Hall Farmhouse and barn 54.12399°N 2.73459°W	—	1668	The house and barn are in stone with a slate roof. The house is rendered, it has two storeys, and three bays. The windows are sashes, and on the front is a gabled porch. The doorway has a chamfered surround and a shaped lintel. The barn to the left has a wide entrance with a segmental arch.	II
Birkland Barrow Farmhouse; 54.11461°N 2.72924°W	—	Late 17th century	A sandstone house, partly rendered, with a slate roof, in two storeys with an attic. Many of the windows are mullioned; others are modern. The doorway has chamfered jambs and a shaped, inscribed lintel.	II
Capernwray Old Hall; 54.13979°N 2.72059°W	—	Late 17th century	A house in sandstone, partly pebbledashed, with a slate roof. It has a T-shaped plan, is in two storeys with an attic, and has a three-bay front. The doorway has a moulded surround and a shaped lintel. The windows are modern.	II
Hogarth House; 54.12393°N 2.73393°W	—	Late 17th century	The house dates mainly from 1759. It is in stone with a slate roof, in two storeys with an attic, and has a symmetrical two bay front. The windows on the front are double sashes with mullions. The doorway has a plain surround and a fanlight, and above it is a decorated date plaque.	II
Well House; 54.12468°N 2.73567°W	—	1683	The house is in pebbledashed stone with a slate roof, and has two storeys and two bays. The windows on the front are sashes, and at the rear is a mullioned window. The doorway has a moulded surround, and a battlemented lintel.	II
Yew Tree Farmhouse; 54.12398°N 2.73018°W	—	1684	A pebbledashed stone house with a slate roof in two storeys and two bays. The doorway has a moulded surround. To the left is a lower extension with a stone-slate roof, and there is an outshut at the rear. Most of the windows are mullioned.	II
New Capernwray Farmhouse; 54.13969°N 2.71548°W	—	1687	The house is in stone with a slate roof. It has a T-shaped plan, two storeys and two bays. The central doorway has chamfered jambs and a shaped lintel inscribed with initials and the date. The windows are modern.	II
Rose Cottage; 54.13930°N 2.71599°W	—	1687	The cottage is in stone with a slate roof, and has two storeys and two bays. The doorway has a moulded surround, and the windows are mullioned.	II
Croft House; 54.12332°N 2.73053°W	—	1697	The house is in pebbledashed stone with a slate roof, in two storeys and three bays. The windows are sashes with plain surrounds, and the doorway has a moulded surround and a shaped inscribed lintel. There are later extensions at the rear.	II
Hall Farmhouse; 54.12358°N 2.73911°W	—	1704	A pebbledashed stone house with a slate roof, it has two storeys with an attic. The house has a T-shaped plan with a three-bay front. The windows are sashes with plain surrounds. The doorway has a moulded surround and a shaped lintel.	II
Greenbank Farmhouse; 54.12359°N 2.73986°W	—	1712	The house is in pebbledashed stone with a slate roof, and has two storeys and two bays with a rear wing. The windows are sashes, and the doorway has a chamfered surround and a battlemented lintel. In the rear wing is a mullioned window.	II
Cragg Cottage and Cragg House; 54.12334°N 2.73029°W	—	1721	Originally one house, later divided into two, it is in pebbledashed stone with a slate roof. There are two storeys and two bays. Most of the windows are mullioned, and one has been replaced by a horizontally-sliding sash window. The doorway has chamfered jambs and a battlemented lintel.	II
Green Meadow; 54.12346°N 2.74010°W	—	1744	A pebbledashed stone house with a slate roof, in two storeys with three bays, the right one skewed towards the road. There are two sash windows, the others being modern. The doorway has a moulded surround carried round an inscribed battlemented lintel.	II
Lamond Cottage; 54.12201°N 2.73460°W	—	Late 18th century (possible)	A sandstone house with a slate roof, in two storeys and two bays. The windows are mullioned.	II
Wall and gate piers, Hogarth House; 54.12388°N 2.73400°W	—	18th century	The piers and wall are in sandstone. Each gate pier has chamfered rustication, a moulded cornice, and a square cap. There are low walls linking the piers to the house and to corner piers.	II
Hogarth Cottage and barn 54.12408°N 2.73405°W	—	Late 18th century	The cottage and barn are in sandstone with a slate roof. The cottage has mullioned windows and a doorway with a plain surround. The barn, to the right. has been converted for residential use, its doorway with a chamfered surround converted into a window.	II
Kirkhouse; 54.11950°N 2.73015°W	—	Late 18th century	A pebbledashed stone house with a slate roof, in two storeys with an attic and three bays. The windows are sashes with plain surrounds. The doorway has a moulded surround and an inscribed lintel.	II
Barn, Old Hall Farm; 54.12404°N 2.73513°W	—	Late 18th century	The barn is in sandstone with a slate roof. The wide entrance is partly blocked and has a segmental arch, and there are blocked ventilation slits. On the right gable end is a modern doorway.	II
Kellet Lane Bridge, (No. 130); 54.13418°N 2.73785°W		1797	The bridge carries Kellet Lane over the Lancaster Canal. It is in sandstone and consists of a single elliptical arch with a projecting keystone and a rounded parapet.	II
Canal bridge No 131; 54.14004°N 2.72144°W		1797	The bridge carries a lane over the Lancaster Canal. It is in sandstone and consists of a single elliptical arch with a projecting keystone and a rounded parapet.	II
Beech House; 54.12312°N 2.73573°W	—	Early 19th century	The house is in pebbledashed stone with a slate roof, in two storeys and three bays. The windows are sashes with plain surrounds. The doorway has a moulded surround and a lintel inscribed with the date 1679. At the rear is a mullioned window.	II
Eagle's Head; 54.12284°N 2.73575°W		Early 19th century	A public house in limestone with a slate roof. The main part has two storeys and a symmetrical three-bay front. The windows are sashes, and the door has a plain surround and a hood on consoles. A former barn and stables to the left have been incorporated into the public house.	II
Gamekeeper's Tower; 54.13594°N 2.70390°W		Early 19th century	Originating probably as a shooting lodge, it is in sandstone, and consists of a three-storey derelict tower with a turret on the north side and a battlemented parapet. On the west side is a single-storey lean-to.	II
Shenstone House and outbuildings 54.12343°N 2.73562°W	—	Early 19th century	The house and buildings are in stone with slate roofs. The house is in Georgian style, in two storeys with a basement and attic, and three bays with rear outshut. The windows are sashes and the central doorway has a moulded cornice. Associated with the house, and included in the listing are a stable, a pig sty, and a cart shed.	II
Wilson House; 54.12404°N 2.73384°W	—	Early 19th century	A stone house with a slate roof, in two storeys and two bays. The openings have plain surrounds. There is a modern bay window, the other windows being sashes.	II
Hall Garth; 54.12435°N 2.73675°W		1826	A country house in stuccoed limestone with a hipped slate roof. It has two storeys and a main front of five bays. The windows are sashes with plain surrounds. The centre is recessed with pilasters, and a Greek Doric portico with four columns and a pediment. The west front has four bays, the north front has three, and it contains a doorway with a pediment on consoles.	II
Capernwray Chapel; 54.14404°N 2.70291°W		1840	Originally a private chapel for Capernwray Hall by Edmund Sharpe, the tower and chancel were added by E. G. Paley in 1856. It is in sandstone with a slate roof, and consists of a nave, a chancel, and a southwest tower containing a porch. The tower has five stages with clasping buttresses, a pyramidal roof and a weathervane. The west window is in Geometrical style, and the other windows are lancets.	II
Capernwray Hall; 54.14363°N 2.69624°W		1844	A country house by Edmund Sharpe in Perpendicular style. It is in sandstone with a slate roof, and in two storeys with a four-storey tower. The entrance front is in nine bays and has a central two-storey porch with an oriel windows and corner turrets, and battlemented parapets. To the east is a stable court with a gateway and a tower. The windows are mullioned and transomed.	II*
Old Hall and cottages 54.12377°N 2.73325°W	—	Mid 19th century	A house with two cottages to the right, in two storeys, with a sandstone façade and slate roofs. The windows are mullioned and there are hood moulds. The house has a symmetrical front of three bays. The windows in the lower floor are also transomed, and the doorway has a four-centred arch. The cottages are in a mirror image, and have central doorways with triangular heads.	II*
The Gables; 54.12355°N 2.73665°W	—	Mid 19th century	A sandstone house with a slate roof in two storeys. It has a west front of two bays, the left bay being gabled. The windows are mullioned, and on the left return is a gabled porch.	II*
Gates and gate piers, Hall Garth; 54.12379°N 2.73650°W	—	Mid 19th century	The gate piers are in sandstone, and are square, panelled and tapering. They have caps with a moulded cornice and a plain frieze. The gates are elaborately decorated in wrought iron, one is wide and the other is narrow, with an openwork pillar between.	II
Village cross 54.12381°N 2.73571°W		19th century (probable)	The cross stands on the village green, and was restored in 1983. It is in sandstone and stands on two square steps. The base, which may date from the 18th century, consists of a block with a socket for the shaft. The upper part of the shaft and the head date from the restoration.	II
Walls, Hogarth House; 54.12388°N 2.73382°W	—	Uncertain	The wall is in sandstone and it incorporates a re-set doorway. This has a chamfered surround, a triangular head, and a lintel inscribed with initials and the date 1673.	II
