= River Keer =

River in Lancashire and Cumbria, England

Coordinates: 54°07′44″N 2°47′33″W

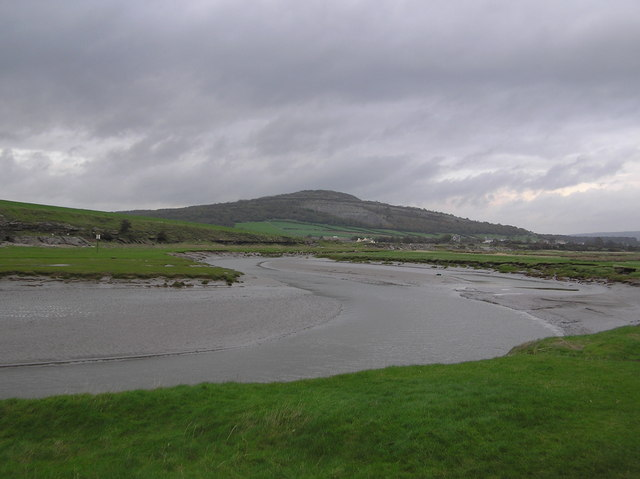
- Bend in the Keer (with Warton Crag in the background) near Carnforth, Lancashire, England

Location
- Country: United Kingdom
- Part: England
- County: Lancashire, Cumbria

The River Keer is a river in Northern England. It flows for 10 kilometres (6.2 mi) through the English counties of Lancashire and Cumbria.

For parts of its course, the Keer marks the boundary between Lancashire and Cumbria, as well as the ancient counties of Lancashire and Westmorland.

The river rises on Docker Moor near the villages of Whittington and Hutton Roof, following a westerly course, passing the villages of Capernwray, Borwick and Warton, as well as Pine Lake, before reaching Carnforth, after which the river runs through salt marshes before pouring into the Kent estuary and Morecambe Bay as part of the Arnside and Silverdale Area of Outstanding Natural Beauty.
