= Activated alumina =

Chemical compound

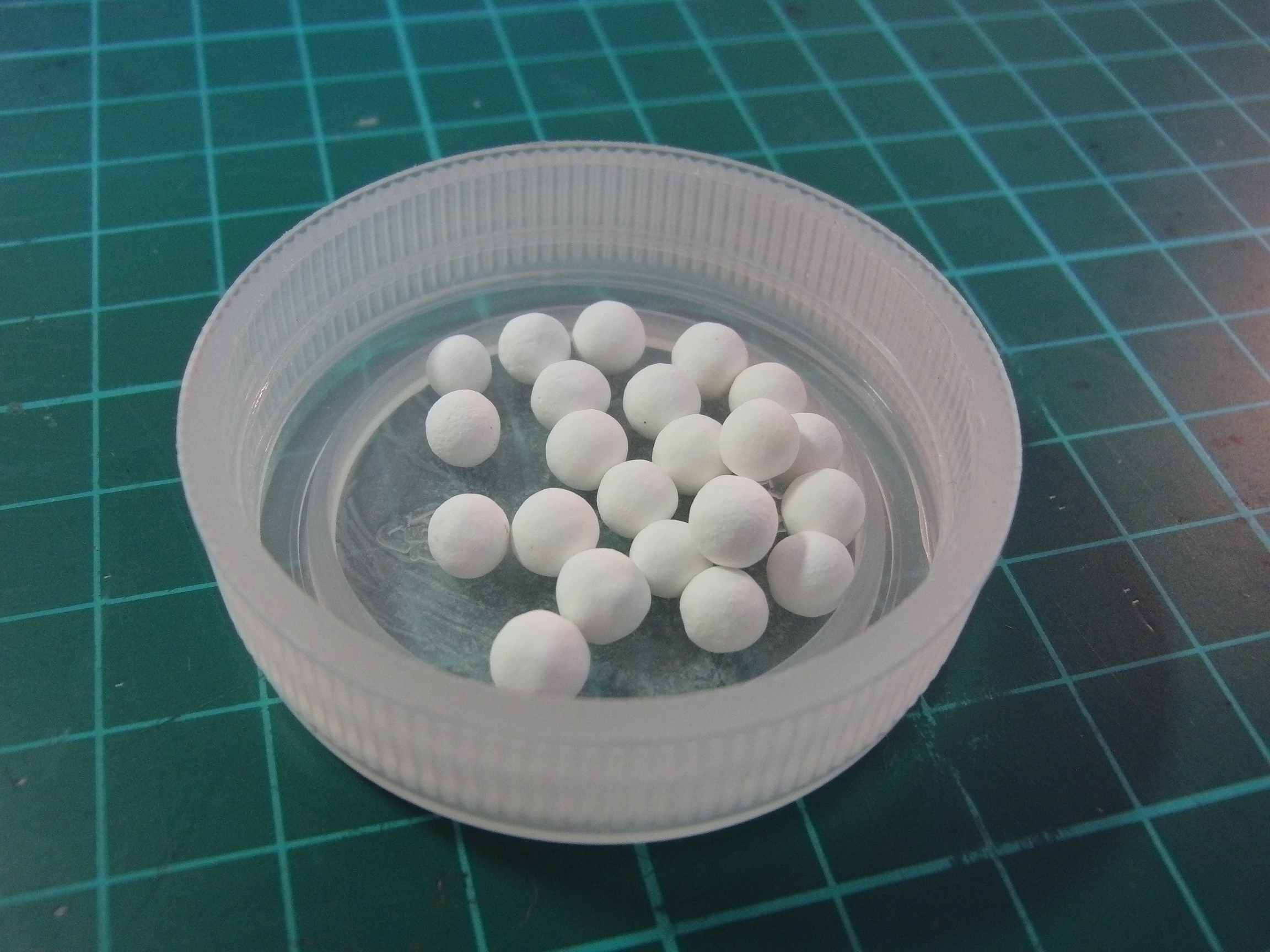
Activated alumina

Activated alumina is manufactured from aluminium hydroxide by dehydroxylating it in a way that produces a highly porous material; this material can have a surface area significantly over 200 m^{2}/g. The compound is used as a desiccant (to keep things dry by adsorbing water from the air) and as a filter of fluoride, arsenic and selenium in drinking water. It is made of aluminium oxide (alumina; Al_{2}O_{3}). It has a very high surface-area-to-weight ratio, due to the many "tunnel like" pores that it has. Activated alumina in its phase composition can be represented only by metastable forms (gamma-Al_{2}O_{3} etc.). Corundum (alpha-Al_{2}O_{3}), the only stable form of aluminum oxide, does not have such a chemically active surface and is not used as a sorbent.

== Uses ==
=== Catalyst applications ===
Activated alumina is used for a wide range of adsorbent and catalyst applications including the adsorption of catalysts in polyethylene production, in hydrogen peroxide production, as a selective adsorbent for many chemicals including arsenic, fluoride, in sulfur removal from fluid streams (Claus Catalyst process).

=== Desiccant ===
Used as a desiccant, it works by a process called adsorption. The water in the air actually sticks to the alumina itself in between the tiny passages as the air passes through them. The water molecules become trapped so that the air is dried out as it passes through the filter. This process is reversible. If the alumina desiccant is heated to ~200 °C, it will release the trapped water. This process is called regenerating the desiccant.

=== Defluoridation ===
Defluoridation is the downward adjustment of the level of fluoride in drinking water. Activated Alumina process is one of the widely used adsorption methods for the defluoridation of drinking water. In the US, there are widespread programs to fluoridate drinking water. However, in certain regions, such as the Rajasthan region of India, there is enough fluoride in the water to cause fluorosis. A study from the Harvard school of Public Health found exposure to high levels of fluoride as a child correlated with lower IQ.

Fluoride removal by activated alumina depends on water chemistry and operating conditions, including pH and the contact time between the water and the adsorbent. The United States Environmental Protection Agency's design manual recommends an influent pH of 5.5–6.0 and an empty bed contact time of at least five minutes for activated alumina treatment systems.

Activated alumina used for fluoride removal can be regenerated with a sodium hydroxide solution, followed by neutralization with sulfuric acid and rinsing before the bed is returned to service.

=== Vacuum systems ===
In high vacuum applications, activated alumina is used as a charge material in fore-line traps to prevent oil generated by rotary vane pumps from back streaming into the system. A baffle of activated alumina can also replace the refrigerated trap often required for diffusion pumps, though this is rarely used.

=== Biomaterial ===
Its mechanical properties and non-reactivity in the biological environment allow it to be a suitable material used to cover surfaces in friction in body prostheses (e.g. hip or shoulder prostheses).

== See also ==
- Activated carbon
- Silica gel
- Synthetic Magnesium Silicate
