= Torchbearers International =

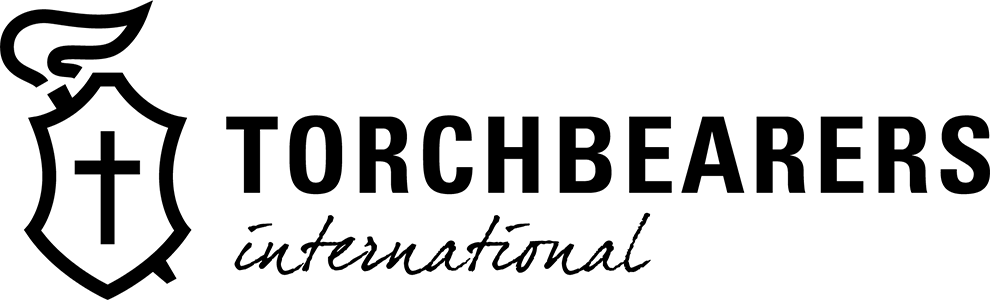
- Founded: 1947
- Founder: Major W. Ian Thomas
- Purpose: Promoting Christ in You – the hope of glory!
- Location(s): Estes Park, Colorado, USA, and with 25 affiliated centres in 20 countries around the world
- Origins: Capernwray Missionary Fellowship of Torchbearers, England
- Key people: Peter Reid (Director)
- Website: torchbearers.org

Torchbearers International consists of an affiliation of 25 centers around the world. Torchbearers International was founded by evangelist and author Major W. Ian Thomas, in England, in 1947.

Torchbearers International's goal is to provide practical Christian education to develop personal spiritual growth, prepare people for an effective Church life, and teach a working knowledge of the Bible. The organization works by providing a number of Bible schools and Christian conference centers around the world.

Torchbearers' mission is to proclaim the transforming presence of Jesus Christ through biblical teaching and practical training, equipping men and women for service in His church worldwide.

Torchbearers' founder, Major W. Ian Thomas, was an evangelical teacher often identified with the Keswick Convention ministry. The main thrust of their theology is that of the exchanged life or 'Christ in You'.

== Theology ==
Central to Torchbearers' theology is the belief that the way in which one lives the Christian life is by quieting or extinguishing the self, and allowing Christ to live his life through you in a very literal way. This is the essential teaching of the Keswick Convention, which Major Thomas had been a featured speaker for. His advocation of Keswick theology earned him the label of a "strict Keswick" by M. James Sawyer Th.M., PhD in his article concerning the Keswick movement.[2] While there is no end to the verbiage and metaphor used to describe this process of Christ living through you (Thomas himself never used the term "extinguish oneself"), Major W. Ian Thomas states it in the following manner in the foreword he wrote for well-known Higher Life proponent Bob George in his Higher-Life opus "Classic Christianity".

There are those who have a life they never live. They have come to Christ and thanked Him only for what He did, but do not live in the power of who He is. Between the Jesus who "was" and the Jesus who "will be" they live in a spiritual vacuum, trying with no little zeal to live for Christ a life that only He can live in and through them, perpetually begging for what in Him they already have!

It is further observed that it is man's consent that is the efficacious will that moves God to accomplish sanctification in the life of the believer:

The One who calls you to a life of righteousness is the One who by our consent lives that life of righteousness through you!

== History ==
Torchbearers International (initially known as the "Capernwray Missionary Fellowship of Torchbearers") began in northern England at Capernwray Hall in 1947.

It was the German youth who came in those early years to Capernwray who began calling themselves the “Fackelträger” or “carriers of the torch”, and so the name “Torchbearers” was born.

According to Thomas:

"As a young evangelist, my love and enthusiasm for Christ as my Saviour kept me very, very busy until out of sheer frustration, I finally came to the point of quitting. That was the turning point which transformed my Christian life. In my despair I discovered that the Lord Jesus gave Himself FOR me, so that risen from the dead He might give Himself TO me, He who IS the Christian Life.

Instead of pleading for help I began to thank Him for all that He wanted to be, sharing His Life with me every moment of every day. I learned to say “Lord Jesus, I can’t, You never said I could; but You can, and always said You would. That is all I need to know”. From that moment life became the adventure that God always intended it to be. That was the beginning of Torchbearers, and this continues to be the main thrust of our ministry around the world the – Saving Life of Christ.”

== Locations ==
The organization maintains 25 locations in 20 different countries worldwide.

Country	Location Name	Language(s)	City/Town	Bible School sessions
Albania	Crossroads	Albanian, English	Ersekë, Albania	Sep-Dec, Jan-Mar
Australia	Capernwray Australia	English	Burradoo, NSW, Australia	Sep-Dec, Jan-Jun
Austria	Schloss Klaus	German	Klaus an der Pyhrnbahn, Austria	Oct-Mar
Austria	Tauernhof	English	Schladming, Austria	Sep-Dec, Apr-Jun
Canada	Capernwray Harbor	English	Thetis Island, BC, Canada	Sep-May
Costa Rica	Portantorchas	English, Spanish	San José, Costa Rica	Aug-Nov, Feb-May
France	Champfleuri	French	Le Champ près Froges, France	Sep-Dec, Jan-Mar
Germany	Bodenseehof	English	Fischbach, Germany	Sep-Mar
Germany	Klostermüle	German	Obernhof an der Lahn, Germany	Oct-Mar
Greece	Kingfisher Project	English	Magnesia, Greece	Sep-Nov, Apr-Jun
India	Himalayan Torchbearers	English	Dehradun, India	Oct-Dec, Apr-May
Indonesia	Pondok Kepenrey	Indonesian	Cipanas, Indonesia	none (Conferences and Camps)
Japan	Yamanakako	English	Yamanashi, Japan	May-Jun
Malaysia	Harvest Haven	English	Perak, Malaysia	Apr, May
New Zealand	Capernwray NZ	English	Cambridge, New Zealand	Jul-Dec, Jan-Jun
Philippines	Torchbearers Philippines	Filipino	Manila, Philippines	none (Conferences)
Romania	Purtătorii de Făclie	English, Romanian	Râsnov, Romania	Apr-Jun
Spain	Chalet Rio Vida	English	Campello, Spain	Jan-Mar
Sweden	Holsby	English	Holsbybrunn, Sweden	Sep-May, Sep-Mar, Apr-May, Jul, Sep-Dec, Jan-Mar
Switzerland	Chasa Perspectiva	English, German	Lavin, Switzerland	none (Camps, Retreats, Adventure, and Workshops)
Switzerland	Credo	English	Wilderswil, Switzerland	Feb-Mar (3 weeks)
U.S.A.	His Hill	English	Comfort, TX, USA	Sep-May
U.S.A.	Ravencrest Chalet	English	Estes Park, CO, USA	Sep-May
U.S.A.	Timberline Lodge	English	Winter Park, CO, USA	Sep-May
U.K. (England)	Capernwray Hall	English	Carnforth, England	Sep-Mar, Apr-Jun
