= Listed buildings in Priest Hutton =

Priest Hutton is a civil parish in Lancaster, Lancashire, England. It contains twelve listed buildings that are recorded in the National Heritage List for England. All of the listed buildings are designated at Grade II, the lowest of the three grades, which is applied to "buildings of national importance and special interest". The parish contains the village of Priest Hutton, and is otherwise rural. Most of the listed buildings are houses, farmhouse and farm buildings. The Lancaster Canal passes through the parish, and a bridge crossing it is listed. Also listed is the telephone kiosk in the centre of the village.

== Buildings ==
Name and location	Photograph	Date	Notes
Rockery Cottage; 54.15821°N 2.72285°W	—	17th century	A pebbledashed stone house with a slate roof, in two storeys and two bays with later extensions. There is one mullioned window, the others being modern. Inside the house is a bressumer.
Watson House; 54.15807°N 2.72444°W	—	17th century	The house is in stone with a slate roof, and has two storeys. The windows have been altered. To the left a former farm building has been incorporated into the house.
Woodbine Cottage; 54.15835°N 2.72063°W	—	17th century	A stone house with a slate roof, extended in the late 18th century. It has two storeys and five bays. The windows are mullioned, and some contain sashes. In the fourth bay is a modern gabled porch, and the fifth bay contains a French window.
Bankfield House; 54.15806°N 2.72407°W	—	Late 17th century	The house is in pebbledashed stone with a slate roof, and has two storeys and three bays. The windows are sashes with segmental heads. In the centre is a gabled porch, and at the rear is an outshut and wing. Inside the house is a bressumer.
Upp Hall Farmhouse; 54.16027°N 2.71394°W	—	Early 18th century (possible)	A pebbledashed stone house on a limestone plinth with a slate roof. It is two storeys and three bays. The windows on the ground floor are sashes, and those above are modern. At the rear is an outshut, a later parallel wing, and another wing at right angles.
Gibson House; 54.15781°N 2.71977°W	—	Mid 18th century	The house is in rendered stone with a slate roof. There are two storeys and three bays. The windows are sashes, and on the front is a gabled porch. At the rear is a later parallel range.
Rose Lea; 54.15780°N 2.72116°W	—	Mid 18th century	A stone house with a pebbledashed front and a slate roof. It has two storeys with an attic and three bays. The windows are mullioned, other than one sash window. In front of the doorway is a modern porch.
Tewitfield Old Turnpike Bridge (No 138); 54.15400°N 2.73540°W		1797	The bridge carries Kellets Lane over the Lancaster Canal. It is in sandstone, and consists of a single elliptical arch with a projecting keystone and solid parapet with a rounded top.
Ridge House and barn 54.15875°N 2.68315°W	—	c. 1800	The house and barn are in stone with a slate roof. The house has two storeys and one bay, and contains sash windows and a gabled porch. The barn to the left has a wide entrance, a doorway, and external steps leading to a first floor doorway. There are extensions and the side and rear.
Westview and barn 54.15760°N 2.71969°W	—	c. 1800	A stone house and barn with a slate roof. The house has two storeys and two bays. The windows are sashes and the doorway has a timber porch. The barn on the right has a wide entrance with a segmental arch.
Buckstone House; 54.16354°N 2.73092°W	—	Early 19th century	The house is in limestone with sandstone dressings and a slate roof. It has two storeys with an attic, a main range of three bays, and a gabled cross-wing to the left. The windows in the main range are sashes, and in the cross-wing they are mullioned. The doorway has a porch with a balcony with iron railings.
Telephone kiosk 54.15765°N 2.72050°W		1935	A K6 type telephone kiosk, designed by Giles Gilbert Scott. Constructed in cast iron with a square plan and a dome, it has three unperforated crowns in the top panels.
