= Over Kellet =

Village in Lancashire, England

Coordinates: 54.124°N 2.734°W

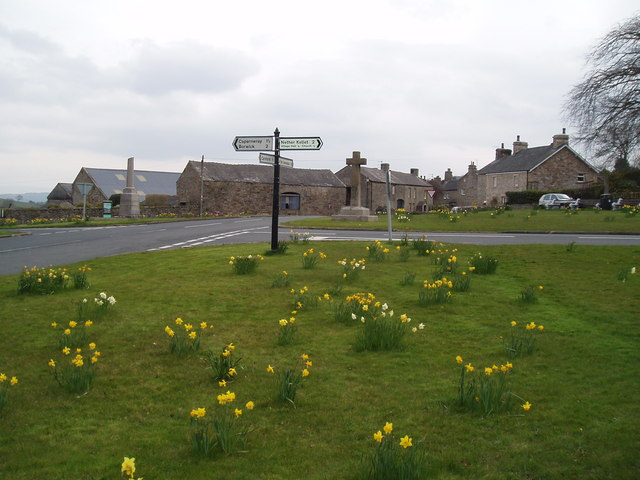
- Village Green

- Location in the City of Lancaster district Location within Lancashire
- Population: 761 (2011)
- OS grid reference: SD520700
- Civil parish: Over Kellet
- District: Lancaster
- Shire county: Lancashire
- Region: North West
- Country: England
- Sovereign state: United Kingdom
- Post town: CARNFORTH
- Postcode district: LA6
- Dialling code: 01524
- Police: Lancashire
- Fire: Lancashire
- Ambulance: North West
- UK Parliament: Morecambe and Lunesdale

Over Kellet is a village and civil parish near Carnforth in the English county of Lancashire. The parish, which is in the City of Lancaster, includes the village of Capernwray, at its northern end, and has a population of 778, decreasing slightly to 761 at the 2011 Census. The Lancaster Canal passes through the parish.

The village was referred to as Chellet in the Domesday Book, and more recently has also been known as Lesser Kellet. It is approximately 1 mile (1.6 km) east of Carnforth, and 0.6 miles (0.97 km) east of junction 35 of the M6 motorway.

The Church of St Cuthbert has existed since 1215. The current building, a Grade II* listed building, was mostly built in the 16th century. It was restored in 1864, and is now a joint Anglican/Methodist church.

Capernwray Dive Centre can be found on the outskirts of the village.

== Capernwray Hall ==
Capernwray Hall is an 1844 country house designed by Edmund Sharpe and is a grade II* listed building. Since 1947 it has been the home of the Capernwray Missionary Fellowship of Torchbearers. Capernwray Old Hall is a different, grade II listed, late 17th-century building.

== See also ==
- Listed buildings in Over Kellet
