= Francis Bindlosse =

English politician

Sir Francis Bindlosse (c. 1603 – 25 July 1629) was an English politician who sat in the House of Commons in 1628.

== Biography ==
Bindlosse was the eldest son of Sir Robert Bindloss of Borwick Hall, Lancaster, was educated at St John's College, Cambridge (1617) and studied the law at Gray's Inn (1620). He was knighted in 1624 and predeceased his father.

In 1628, he was elected Member of Parliament for Lancaster. He died on 25 July 1629 at the age of 25 and was buried at Warton church.

== Family ==
He had married twice:firstly a daughter of Thomas Charnock of Charnock, Astley, Lancashire with whom he had a daughter and secondly Cecilia, the daughter of Thomas, 3rd Lord De La Warr, with whom he had three sons and a daughter.

- Robert, his son and heir, who was created a baronet in 1641.
- Delaware, who died unmarried before 1664.
- Francis, of Brock Hall in Lancashire who died without children.
- Dorothy, who married Sir Charles Wheler lieutenant-colonel of the Guards to Charles II.

== Notes ==
Parliament of England
Preceded by Sir Thomas Fanshawe; Thomas Jermyn	Member of Parliament for Lancaster; 1628; With: Sir Thomas Fanshawe	Succeeded by Sir Thomas Fanshawe
