= Capernwray Missionary Fellowship of Torchbearers =

UK evangelical Christian educational organisation

The Capernwray Missionary Fellowship of Torchbearers
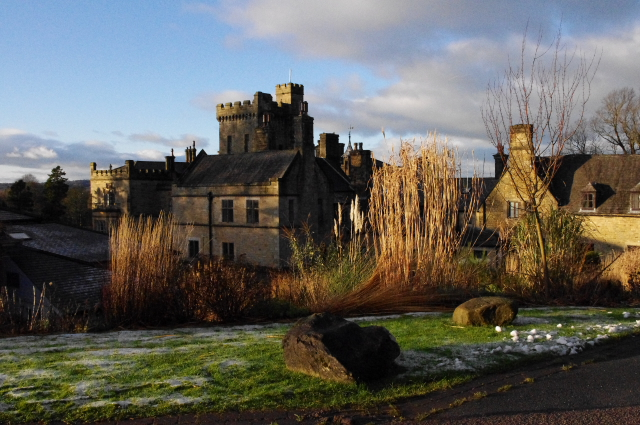
- Capernwray Hall, the headquarters of CMFOT
- Founded: 1947 (bible school); 1998 (charitable company)
- Founder: Major W. Ian Thomas
- Type: Registered as a British charity and a private company, limited by guarantee with no share capital
- Registration no.: Company number 03573958; Charity number 1073139
- Location: Capernwray Hall, Capernwray, Carnforth LA6 1AG, England
- Coordinates: 54.1436°N 2.6963°W
- Region served: UK / World
- Method: Short-term Bible schools Residential holidays and conferences
- Key people: Julie Burrows (company secretary); Derek Burnside (Bible school principal); Dougie Roy (holiday and events manager)
- Subsidiaries: Capernwray Parkland Farm Ltd (responsible for the running of the farm and estate of Capernwray Hall)
- Revenue: ▲£1.545m (2022)
- Employees: 30
- Volunteers: 20 to 50
- Website: www.capernwray.org
- The Capernwray Missionary Fellowship of Torchbearers is an autonomous body but is part of a broader fellowship known as Torchbearers International.

The Capernwray Missionary Fellowship of Torchbearers (CMFOT) is an evangelical Christian educational organisation based at Capernwray Hall in north Lancashire, England. In 1998 the organisation was incorporated as a UK charitable company.

CMFOT was founded by Major W. Ian Thomas in 1947. Other centres have since been established around the world and together form a worldwide fellowship known as Torchbearers International, with headquarters at Ravencrest Chalet, Estes Park, Colorado, US.

Torchbearers International works by providing a number of Bible schools and Christian conference centres on the world.

CMFOT's founder, Major W. Ian Thomas (1914–2007), was an evangelical teacher and has often been identified with the Keswick Convention ministry. The main thrust of his theology is that of the exchanged life or 'Christ in You'. Major Thomas' sons have continued from their father in the wider organisation. Mark Thomas was the managing director at Capernwray Hall, Chris Thomas was the International Director and Director at Ravencrest, Colorado, United States and Peter Thomas is director at Capernwray New Zealand and Moss Vale, Australia.

== Capernwray Bible School ==
Capernwray was first used as a Bible School in Autumn 1947, to meet a demand for Bible teaching from the many new converts from holiday conferences held at the Hall. The school has matured and grown over the years and now has intakes each Winter and Spring, to a capacity of around 190 students, from sometimes as many as 30 different nations. During the Summer, Easter and Christmas breaks the facilities are used for Christian conferences and holidays.

== Capernwray Holidays ==
Capernwray initially started off as a Christian holiday centre and this activity continues to be a vital part of the ministry today. The holidays currently on offer cater for a mixed age range of young people, families and a cross-section of adults. Guests come from around the United Kingdom and from overseas, including many from Germany, still maintaining a link that goes back more than 60 years.

== Theology ==
The Torchbearers centres, which are now scattered around the world, are international and interdenominational by nature.
