= Capernwray Hall =

Listed building in Lancashire, England

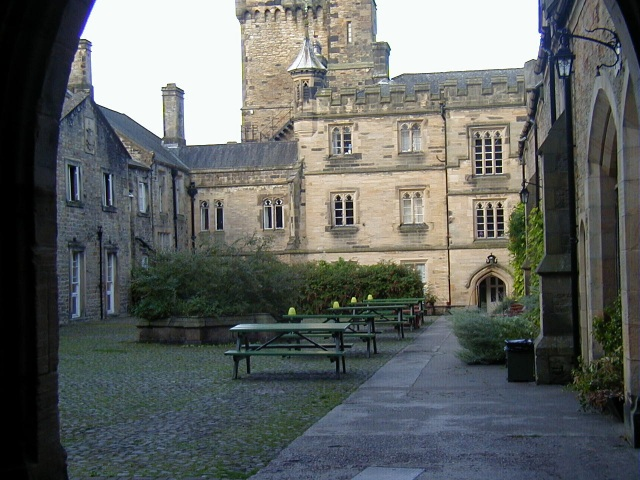
- Capernwray Hall

- Location in the City of Lancaster district
- Former names: Keer Bank

General information
- Architectural style: Gothic Revival
- Location: Near Carnforth, Lancashire, England
- Coordinates: 54.1436°N 2.6963°W
- Year built: 1805
- Renovated: 1844, 1875–76
- Client: Marton family
- Governing body: Capernwray Missionary Fellowship of Torchbearers

Design and construction
- Architects: Edmund Sharpe, E. G. Paley, Paley and Austin

Renovating team
- Architect: George Marton

Listed Building – Grade II*
- Official name: Capernwray Hall
- Designated: 7 November 1983
- Reference no.: 1071908

Capernwray Hall is a former country house situated 3 miles (4.8 km) east-northeast of Carnforth, Lancashire, England, and is currently used as a Christian Bible school and holiday centre. The house is recorded in the National Heritage List for England as a designated Grade II* listed building. It stands in grounds included in the Register of Historic Parks and Gardens at Grade II.

== Early history ==
The house originated in 1805 for the Marton family, and was named Keer Bank. By 1830 its name had been changed to Capernwray Hall. In 1840 the Lancaster architect Edmund Sharpe had designed a private chapel in the grounds of the hall, now known as Capernwray Chapel. In 1844 Sharpe remodelled the hall for George Marton, retaining its rectangular core. He more than doubled the size of the house by adding a west wing containing dining and drawing rooms, a top-lit staircase, a tower, and Gothic style windows. The tower also acted as a water tower for the house. Later, in 1848, after Sharpe had been joined as a partner by E. G. Paley, a stable and a service block were added to the east of the house. In 1875–76 a southeast block including a billiard room and a clock tower was added by the successors in the practice, Paley and Austin.

== Architecture ==
=== Exterior ===
Capernwray Hall is constructed in sandstone with slate roofs. Its architectural style is Perpendicular, and the hall is largely embattled. It is mainly in two storeys. Its plan consists of a north entrance front, east and west wings, and a central range. Behind the north range is a four-storey tower, with a higher turret containing bell openings and a clock face. It is surmounted by a pyramidal roof. The north front has nine bays. The lateral two bays on each side project forward. In the centre is a porch with corner turrets and an oriel window in the upper storey. The west front contains two two-storey bay windows containing Perpendicular tracery. The south front has a single-storey canted bay window. To the east of the hall is the stable block. On the east side is a gatehouse with battlemented towers.

=== Interior ===
The staircase hall has an open timber roof, and contains a cantilevered staircase and a first floor gallery. The dining and drawing rooms have moulded timber ceilings and contain marble fireplaces. The rooms are divided by an 18th-century wooden screen with Corinthian pilasters. columns and an entablature. It is said that the screen was moved from St Mary's Church, Lancaster.

== Grounds ==
The grounds consist of about 70 hectares (170 acres) of land sloping down to the River Keer. There are three driveway entrances, each of which has a lodge. To the southwest of the hall is a rose garden, set out by Thomas Mawson in 1901. To the northeast of the hall is a kitchen garden. The remainder of the grounds are used mainly as pasture.

== Later history ==
During the Second World War, the pupils from Ripley St Thomas School in Lancaster were evacuated to the hall, and the grounds were used by the army for storing petrol.

On 11 September 1946, the whole of the Capernwray estate went under auction in Lancaster Town Hall, Capernwray Hall being described as "...one medium-sized family residence". On instructions from her husband, Major W. Ian Thomas (who was away in Germany with the British Army), Mrs Joan Thomas attended the auction and finally won the bidding process. Capernwray Hall thus became the property of the Thomas family (subsequently through their shareholding in Capernwray Hall Ltd). Since 1947 the hall has seen continuous use as a Christian centre, originally under the direction of Major Thomas and later by the next generation of the Thomas family, running a Bible school (for approximately 190 students) and residential-stay holidays.

On 31 March 1999, the majority of the assets and business of Capernwray Hall Ltd were transferred by way of a gift from the Thomas family into the newly registered charitable company, The Capernwray Missionary Fellowship of Torchbearers.

In 2019 the Platinum Jubilee Project started to renovate several main areas of the hall in line with regulations from Historic England.

== See also ==
- Grade II* listed buildings in Lancashire
- Listed buildings in Over Kellet
- List of architectural works by Edmund Sharpe
- List of non-ecclesiastical works by E. G. Paley
- List of non-ecclesiastical works by Paley and Austin
