= Robert Bindlosse =

English politician

Sir Robert Bindlosse, 1st Baronet (1624 – 6 November 1688) was an English politician who sat in the House of Commons at various times between 1646 and 1660.

Bindlosse was the son of Sir Francis Bindlosse (died 1629) of Borwick Hall, Lancashire, and was baptised on 8 May 1624. He succeeded his grandfather in 1630, inheriting Borwick Hall, Lancaster. He matriculated from Trinity College, Cambridge, in 1640. He was created a baronet, of Borwick Hall in the County of Lancaster, on 16 June 1641.

In 1646, Bindlosse was elected Member of Parliament for Lancaster in the Long Parliament. He was probably secluded or chose not to sit after Pride's Purge in 1648. He was High Sheriff of Lancashire in 1658.

In 1660, Bindlosse was elected MP for Lancashire in the Convention Parliament. He was High Sheriff of Lancashire again in 1672 and 1673.

He died at the age of 64 and was buried on 15 November 1688 at Warton. He had no male issue and the baronetcy became extinct. He was succeeded by his daughter Cecilia, who married William Standish of Standish, Wigan; the Borwick estate passed to her.

Parliament of England
Preceded by Thomas Fanshawe; John Harrison	Member of Parliament for Lancaster; 1640–1648; With: Thomas Fell	Succeeded by Thomas Fell
Baronetage of England
New creation	Baronet (of Borwick Hall); 1641–1688	Extinct
