= W. Ian Thomas =

Christian evangelical writer (1914–2007)

Walter Ian Thomas
- Born: 13 September 1914; Hampstead, London, England
- Died: 1 August 2007 (aged 92); Estes Park, Colorado, US
- Spouse: Joan Thomas
- Children: Chris; Peter; Mark; Andy

Major W. Ian Thomas (13 September 1914 - 1 August 2007) was an evangelist, Christian evangelical writer, theological teacher and founder of the Torchbearers Bible schools.

== Early life ==
Ian Thomas was born in London on 13 September 1914.

At the age of 12, he was invited to a Bible study group of the Crusaders Christian Youth Movement by a friend. The following summer he was converted to Christ at a Crusaders Union camp.

At the age of 15, he was convinced that he should devote all of his life to serving Jesus Christ. He began to preach out in the open air at Hampstead Heath. He was also actively engaged in Sunday School work as well as in the Crusaders' Bible class.

== Studies ==
He decided to become a doctor and studied at university where he became a leader in the Inter-Varsity Fellowship group. He started a slum club in the East End of London "out of a sheer desire to win souls, to go out and get them. I was a windmill of activity until, at the age of 19, every moment of my day was packed tight with doing things. Thus by the age of 19, I had been reduced to a state of complete exhaustion spiritually, and I felt that there was no point going on."

"Then, one night in November, that year just at midnight, I got down on my knees before God, and I just wept in sheer despair. I said, 'With all my heart I have wanted to serve Thee. I have tried to my uttermost and I am a hopeless failure.' That night things happened. The Lord seemed to make plain to me that night, through my tears of bitterness: 'You see, for seven years, with utmost sincerity, you have been trying to live for Me, on My behalf, the life that I have been waiting for 7 years to live through you.'" Thomas later reflected: "I got up the next morning to an entirely different Christian life, but I want to emphasize this: I had not received one iota more than I had already had for seven years!"

== Military career ==
Thomas served in the British Expeditionary Force in Belgium at the outset of World War II and taking part in the evacuation at Dunkirk. He would also spend time during the war in France, Italy, and Greece (often, fighting).

He was decorated with the D.S.O. (Distinguished Service Order) for conspicuous gallantry in taking out a German machine gun nest, and the T.D. (Territorial Decoration). When the Germans surrendered at the Battle of Monte Cassino, Major Thomas went and took the flag of surrender. The white tablecloth used as the flag is on display in the Royal Fusilier Museum at the Tower of London.

== Later life ==
After World War II, Thomas was probably best known as a Bible teacher, author, and as the founder of both Capernwray Missionary Fellowship of Torchbearers (based at Capernwray Hall, England) and subsequently Torchbearers International (based in US). He moved to Colorado, US in the late 1980s.

== Personal life ==
Thomas was married to Joan from Belfast. They had four sons, who continue the work of Torchbearers.

=== Books ===
- The Saving Life of Christ, Zondervan Publishing, Grand Rapids, Michigan, 1961. ISBN 0-310-33262-1
- The Mystery of Godliness, Zondervan Publishing, Grand Rapids, Michigan, 1964. ISBN 978-0551051256
- If I Perish, I Perish : the Christian Life as seen in Esther, Zondervan Publishing, Grand Rapids, Michigan, 1968. ISBN 978-0310-332428
- The Indwelling Life of Christ : All of Him in All of Me, Multnomah Publishers Inc, Oregon, 2006. ISBN 1-59052-524-8

His first book, The Saving Life of Christ, had a profound effect on Bert Harned, M.D., as can be seen in Harned's book, Any Old Bush - Christ Living in Us.

=== Death ===
Thomas died on 1 August 2007 at the age of 92.
