= St Mary's Church, Borwick =

Coordinates: 54.1544°N 2.7216°W

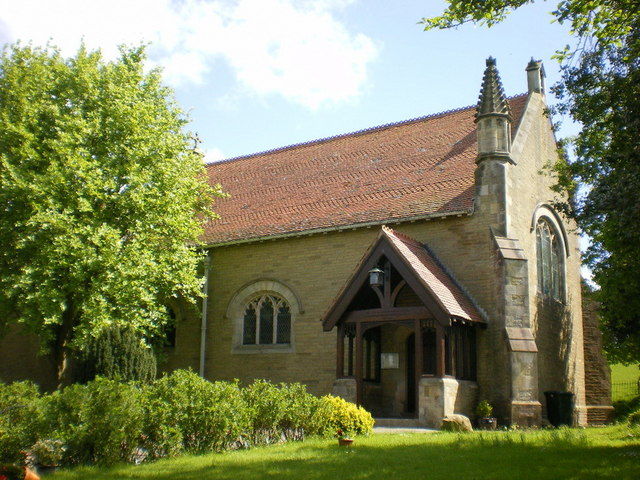
- St Mary's Church, Borwick, from the northwest

- Location in the City of Lancaster district
- OS grid reference: SD 530,734
- Location: Borwick, Lancashire
- Country: England
- Denomination: Anglican
- Website: St Mary, Borwick

History
- Status: Parish church

Architecture
- Functional status: Active
- Heritage designation: Grade II
- Designated: 5 September 2002
- Architect: Paley, Austin and Paley
- Architectural type: Church
- Style: Gothic Revival
- Groundbreaking: 1894
- Completed: 1896

Specifications
- Materials: Stone, tiled roofs

Administration
- Province: York
- Diocese: Blackburn
- Archdeaconry: Lancaster
- Deanery: Tunstall
- Parish: St Oswald, Warton

Clergy
- Vicar: Revd Damian Michael Porter

St Mary's Church is located to the north of the village of Borwick, Lancashire, England. It is an active Anglican parish church in the deanery of Tunstall, the archdeaconry of Lancaster, and the diocese of Blackburn. Its benefice is united with those of St Oswald, Warton, and St John the Evangelist, Yealand Conyers. The church is recorded in the National Heritage List for England as a designated Grade II listed building.

== History ==
The church was built in 1894–96 for William Sharp of Linden Hall in memory of his wife who had died in 1889. It was designed by the Lancaster firm of architects, Paley, Austin and Paley. The church was consecrated on 24 June 1896.

== Architecture ==
St Mary's is constructed in rubble stone with ashlar dressings, and has tiled roofs. Its plan is simple and consists of a nave with a north porch, and a chancel with a south vestry. On the west gable is a small bellcote. Its architectural style is Gothic Revival. At the corners of the church are diagonal stepped buttresses rising to crocketed finials. On the north side of the nave are two three-light windows, with a two-light window in the north wall of the chancel. The east window has three lights. On the south side of the nave are three three-light windows. All these windows contain simple Perpendicular-style tracery. On each side of the vestry is a flat-headed two-light mullioned window.

Inside the church are a Perpendicular-style reredos, an octagonal font, a brass lectern, and a brass chandelier. The two manual organ was installed in 1964, having been moved from a Congregational church in Warrington; it was made by Hall of Kendal. Before installation it had been overhauled by Harrison and Harrison. It was overhauled again in 2005 by David Wells of Liverpool.

== See also ==
- List of works by Paley, Austin and Paley
