= Synthetic magnesium silicate =

Chemical compound

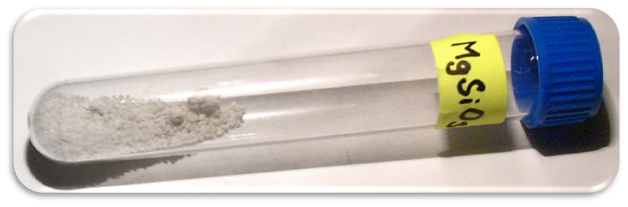
Magnesium Silicate (MgSiO3) in a test tube.

Synthetic magnesium silicates are white, odorless, finely divided powders formed by the precipitation reaction of water-soluble sodium silicate (water glass) and a water-soluble magnesium salt such as magnesium chloride, magnesium nitrate or magnesium sulfate. The composition of the precipitate depends on the ratio of the components in the reaction medium, the addition of the correcting substances, and the way in which they are precipitated.

The molecular formula is typically written as MgO:XSiO_{2}, where X denotes the average mole ratio of SiO_{2} to MgO. The product is hydrated and the formula is sometimes written MgO:XSiO_{2}•H_{2}O to show the water of hydration.

== Properties ==
Unlike natural magnesium silicates like talc, forsterite, and olivine which are crystalline, synthetic magnesium silicates are amorphous. Synthetic magnesium silicates are insoluble in water or alcohol. The particles are usually porous, and the BET surface area can range from less than 100 m^{2}/g to several hundred m^{2}/g.

== Applications ==
The very large active surface makes synthetic magnesium silicate useful for a wide variety of applications: purifying adsorbent (polyols, animal and vegetable oils, chromatography, dry cleaning, sugar, resins, odors); filler (rubber, ceramics, paper, glass, refractories); anti-caking agent (salt); catalyst; catalyst carrier; filter medium.

=== In food ===
The U.S. Food Chemicals Codex, JECFA, and other monographs for Food Grade synthetic magnesium silicate specify a mole ratio of 2MgO:5SiO_{2} (or X=2.5 in the general formula). The most common use for Food Grade synthetic magnesium silicate is as an active filter aid for adsorption of color, free fatty acids and other polar compounds from used frying oils. Various national and international regulations allow use of this material as an anti-caking agent in a wide variety of powdered foods.

When used as a food additive, it is safe to ingest synthetic magnesium silicate. In 1990, the safety of synthetic magnesium silicate was reviewed by the Scientific Committee on Food (SCF) together with that of silica and the other metal alkali silicates. The SCF noted that “the available data, including a number of short-term studies in two species, appear to substantiate the biological inertness of those compounds”. The SCF established a group Acceptable Daily Intake (ADI) not specified for silicon dioxide and the alkali metal silicates.

== See also ==
- Talc, a natural magnesium silicate
- Diatomaceous earth, a natural silicon-based filter material
