= Borwick =

Village in Lancashire, England

Coordinates: 54.151°N 2.728°W

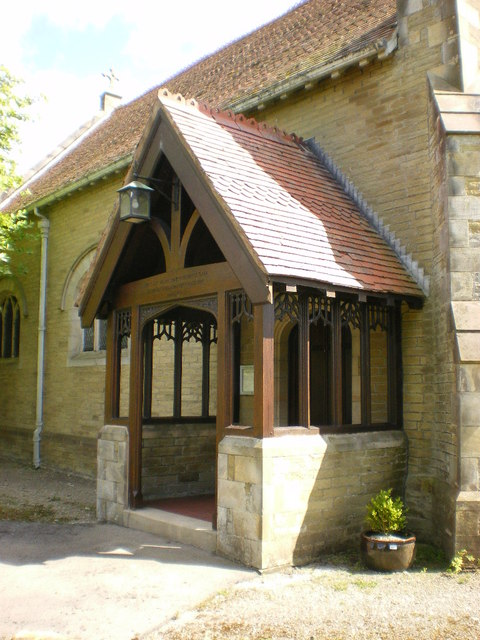
- St Mary's Church

- Location in the City of Lancaster district Location within Lancashire
- Population: 181 (2011)
- OS grid reference: SD525730
- Civil parish: Borwick
- District: Lancaster
- Shire county: Lancashire
- Region: North West
- Country: England
- Sovereign state: United Kingdom
- Post town: CARNFORTH
- Postcode district: LA6
- Dialling code: 01524
- Police: Lancashire
- Fire: Lancashire
- Ambulance: North West
- UK Parliament: Morecambe and Lunesdale

Borwick is a village and civil parish in the City of Lancaster district of Lancashire, England, about 8 miles north of Lancaster, on the Lancaster Canal. It is situated just south of the border with Cumbria. The parish of Borwick had a population of 210 recorded in the 2001 census, decreasing to 181 at the 2011 Census.

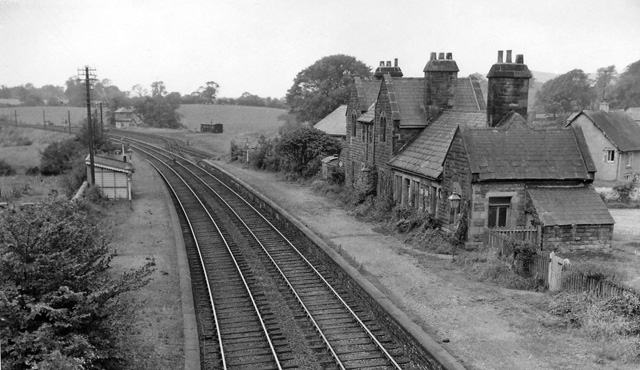
The former Borwick railway station

Borwick railway station was on the former Furness and Midland Joint Railway, now Leeds to Morecambe Line, until its closure in 1960.

== See also ==
- Listed buildings in Borwick
