= Grade I listed buildings in Lancashire =

This is a list of Grade I listed buildings in Lancashire, England.

In the United Kingdom, the term "listed building" refers to a building or other structure officially designated as being of special architectural, historical or cultural significance. These buildings are in three grades: Grade I consists of buildings of outstanding architectural or historical interest. Buildings in England are listed by the Secretary of State for Culture, Media and Sport on recommendations provided by English Heritage, which also determines the grading.

== Blackburn with Darwen ==
Name	Location	Type	Completed (Note: The date given is the date used by Historic England as significant for the initial building or that of an important part in the structure's description.)	Date designated	Grid ref. (Note: The grid reference is based on the British national grid reference system, sometimes known as OSGB36, used by the Ordnance Survey.) Geo-coordinates	Notes	Entry number (Note: The "List Entry Number" is a unique number assigned to each listed building and scheduled monument by Historic England.)	Image
Pleasington Priory	Pleasington	Priory	1816–19	24 November 1966	SD6428726649; 53°44′06″N 2°32′34″W	Pleasington Priory (the Church of St Mary and St John Baptist) was built 1816–19. It is constructed of ashlar and has a slate roof.	1072419	Pleasington Priory More images
Turton Tower	Chapeltown	House	Late medieval	27 January 1967	SD7305515220; 53°37′58″N 2°24′32″W	Turton Tower is a late medieval manor house.	1241557	Turton Tower More images

== Blackpool ==
Name	Location	Type	Completed	Date designated	Grid ref. Geo-coordinates	Notes	Entry number	Image
Blackpool Tower	Blackpool	Tower	1891–1894	10 October 1973	SD3062136033; 53°48′57″N 3°03′19″W	Blackpool Tower was built 1891–94 on the site of Dr Cocker's Aquarium and Menagerie, commissioned by the newly formed Blackpool Tower Company, which was chaired by Blackpool mayor John Bickerstaffe. Inspired by the Eiffel Tower, which had opened in 1889, Blackpool Tower was built to a design by Maxwell and Tuke and quickly became a popular attraction. Built of open steel girders, the tower measures 518 feet (158 m) from the ground to the top of its flagmast. The listed buildings include the tower itself, the ballroom, circus and roof gardens.	1205810	Blackpool Tower More images

== Burnley ==
Name	Location	Type	Completed	Date designated	Grid ref. Geo-coordinates	Notes	Entry number	Image
Gawthorpe Hall and surrounding balustrade	Ightenhill	Country House	1600–05	1 April 1953	SD8068234089; 53°48′10″N 2°17′41″W	Gawthorpe Hall was built 1600–05 for Rev. Lawrence Shuttleworth. It is constructed of coursed sandstone with ashlar dressings. On three storeys, its plan is compact and it has no wings.	1237626	Gawthorpe Hall and surrounding balustrade More images
Great Barn circa 100 metres west of Gawthorpe Hall	Ightenhill	Courtyard	c. 1605	1 April 1953	SD8058034052; 53°48′09″N 2°17′47″W	The Great Barn west of Gawthorpe Hall dates from c. 1605.	1237628	Great Barn circa 100 metres west of Gawthorpe Hall More images
Queen Street Mill	Burnley	Weaving shed	1894	23 December 2013	SD8680434898; 53°49′N 2°12′W	Queen Street Mill (now a museum) is claimed to be the last surviving operational steam-powered weaving mill in the world.	1416482	Queen Street Mill More images
Shuttleworth Hall	Hapton	Farmhouse	Early to Mid 17th century	1 April 1953	SD7837632250; 53°47′10″N 2°19′47″W	Shuttleworth Hall dates from the early to mid-17th century. Formerly a manor house, the building is now a farmhouse consisting of two dwellings.	1274420	Shuttleworth Hall More images
Towneley Hall	Burnley	Country House	c. 1400	10 November 1951	SD8543730858; 53°46′26″N 2°13′21″W	Towneley Hall was built c. 1400.	1247299	Towneley Hall More images

== Chorley ==
Name	Location	Type	Completed	Date designated	Grid ref. Geo-coordinates	Notes	Entry number	Image
Astley Hall	Chorley	House	1. 16th and 17th century 2. Early 19th century (addition); 3. 1949 (restoration)	21 December 1966	SD5745918304; 53°39′34″N 2°38′43″W	Astley Hall dates from the 16th and 17th century with additions in the early 19th century. It is partly constructed of brick with stone dressings and partly timber-framed on a stone plinth.	1362068	Astley Hall More images
Great Barn circa 100 metres west of Hoghton Tower	Hoghton	House	1692	22 October 1952	SD6214526443; 53°43′59″N 2°34′31″W	The Great Barn west of Hoghton Tower dates from 1692.	1164490	Great Barn circa 100 metres west of Hoghton Tower More images
Heskin Hall	Heskin	House	1670	22 October 1952	SD5257415653; 53°38′07″N 2°43′07″W	Heskin Hall was built in 1670.	1164441	Heskin Hall More images
Hoghton Tower	Hoghton	Manor House	1562–63	22 October 1952	SD6220026400; 53°43′57″N 2°34′28″W	Hoghton Tower was built 1562–63.	1072532	Hoghton Tower More images
Mawdesley Hall	Mawdesley	Farmhouse	Early 17th century	22 October 1952	SD4976715109; 53°37′48″N 2°45′40″W	Mawdesley Hall was built in the early 17th century.	1164720	Mawdesley Hall More images

== Fylde ==
Name	Location	Type	Completed	Date designated	Grid ref. Geo-coordinates	Notes	Entry number	Image
Lytham Hall	Lytham	Manor House	1752–64	1 December 1965	SD3568927973; 53°44′39″N 2°58′36″W	Lytham Hall was built 1752–64. It is constructed of red brick with Flemish bond and stone and rendered dressings.	1219078	Lytham Hall More images

== Hyndburn ==
Name	Location	Type	Completed	Date designated	Grid ref. Geo-coordinates	Notes	Entry number	Image
Martholme	Great Harwood	Manor house	Medieval	11 July 1966	SD7527733810; 53°48′00″N 2°22′37″W	Martholme is a medieval manor house, with additions from 1561 and 1607. It is constructed of rendered sandstone rubble and coursed sandstone. Its roofs are slate. The image shows the gatehouse.	1205981	Upload Photo

== Lancaster ==
Name	Location	Type	Completed	Date designated	Grid ref. Geo-coordinates	Notes	Entry number	Image
2 rock cut tombs approximately 4 metres south east of Chapel of St Patrick	Heysham	Grave	Early 14th century	6 April 1979	SD4099861649; 54°02′51″N 2°54′09″W	These two graves date from before the Norman conquest of England.	1207215	2 rock cut tombs approximately 4 metres south east of Chapel of St Patrick More images
6 rock cut tombs approximately 10 metres west of Chapel of St Patrick	Heysham	Grave	Early 14th century	6 April 1979	SD4097761654; 54°02′51″N 2°54′11″W	These six graves date from before the Norman conquest of England.	1292902	6 rock cut tombs approximately 10 metres west of Chapel of St Patrick More images
Ashton Hall	Thurnham, Lancaster	House	1. Early 14th century 2. 1856	1 August 1952	SD4616757303; 54°00′32″N 2°49′22″W	Ashton Hall dates from the 14th century and 1856. It is constructed of sandstone and has slate roofs.	1071756	Ashton Hall More images
Ashton Memorial	Lancaster	Memorial	1. 1905–09; 2. 1985–87 (restoration)	22 December 1953	SD4889561319; 54°02′43″N 2°46′55″W	Ashton Memorial was built 1905–09 by Baron Ashton, a millionaire industrialist, in memory of his wife. It is constructed of Portland stone.	1288429	Ashton Memorial More images
Borwick Hall	Borwick, Lancaster	Manor House	Late 16th century	4 October 1967	SD5255773028; 54°09′03″N 2°43′40″W	This house was built late 16th century although there are remains from 14th century. It is constructed of rubble with sandstone dressings and has a slate roof.	1071914	Borwick Hall More images
Borwick Hall Gatehouse	Borwick, Lancaster	Gatehouse	Probably mid-17th century	4 October 1967	SD5251973026; 54°09′03″N 2°43′42″W	The Gatehouse at Borwick Hall has the date "1650" above the entrance. It is constructed of rubble and has a stone slate roof.	1318063	Borwick Hall Gatehouse More images
Borwick Hall Stables	Borwick, Lancaster	Stable	Probably mid-17th century	4 October 1967	SD5250573007; 54°09′02″N 2°43′43″W	The stables at Borwick Hall were probably built in the mid-17th century.	1362424	Borwick Hall Stables
Burrow Hall	Nether Burrow	Country House	c. 1740	4 October 1967	SD6164975917; 54°10′39″N 2°35′21″W	Burrow Hall is a country house that was built c. 1740. It is constructed of sandstone ashlar and has a slate roof.	1362517	Burrow Hall More images
The Chapter House, Cockersand Abbey	Thurnham, Lancaster	Abbey	Early 13th century	2 May 1968	SD4270453761; 53°58′36″N 2°52′30″W	The Chapter House at Cockersand Abbey was built in the early 13th century; the abbey had existed from the late 12th century. The building is constructed of red sandstone rubble and has a slate roof. Its plan is octagonal although the west side has been squared off. At some point (probably the mid-18th century) it was converted into a family burial chamber.	1362525	The Chapter House, Cockersand Abbey More images
Claughton Hall	Claughton	House	c. 1600	4 October 1967	SD5723966067; 54°05′19″N 2°39′19″W	Claughton Hall was built c. 1600, although it has remains from the 15th century. It was moved and rebuilt 1932–5. It is constructed of sandstone rubble and has stone slate roofs.	1071676	Claughton Hall More images
Hornby Castle	Hornby	Keep	1. 16th century (keep)	4 October 1967	SD5875668580; 54°06′41″N 2°37′57″W	Hornby Castle was built from the 16th to the 19th century.	1317655	Hornby Castle More images
The Judges' Lodgings and attached forecourt, steps, gate piers, gates and railings	Lancaster	Town House	c. 1625	22 December 1953	SD4747461873; 54°03′00″N 2°48′14″W	The Judges' Lodgings were built c. 1625.	1298414	The Judges' Lodgings and attached forecourt, steps, gate piers, gates and railings More images
Lancaster Castle	Lancaster	Castle	c. 1150	18 February 1970	SD4733161850; 54°03′00″N 2°48′21″W	Lancaster Castle was built c. 1150.	1194905	Lancaster Castle More images
Lancaster Priory	Lancaster	Priory	c. 1430	22 December 1953	SD4736161939; 54°03′03″N 2°48′20″W	Lancaster Priory was built c. 1430.	1195068	Lancaster Priory More images
Lune Aqueduct	Lancaster Canal, Halton	Aqueduct	1797	22 December 1953	SD4841763917; 54°04′07″N 2°47′23″W	That part within Halton. Lune Aqueduct was built 1797.	1362451	Lune Aqueduct More images
Old Rectory, Warton	Warton	Vicarage	Mid-14th century	2 May 1968	SD4991372321; 54°08′39″N 2°46′06″W	The Old Rectory at Warton was built in the mid-14th century.	1362462	Old Rectory, Warton More images
St John the Baptist's Church	Tunstall	Church	1. c. 1415; 2. 16th century (alterations)	4 October 1967	SD6141473925; 54°09′35″N 2°35′33″W	St John the Baptist's was built c. 1415.	1071642	St John the Baptist's Church More images
St John the Evangelist's Church	Gressingham	Church	1. 12th century 2. 1734 (partly rebuilt); 3. 1862 (restored)	4 October 1967	SD5725069915; 54°07′24″N 2°39′20″W	St John the Evangelist's has 12th century remains and was partly rebuilt in 1734.	1164600	St John the Evangelist's Church More images
St Margaret's Church	Hornby	Tower	1514	4 October 1967	SD5850668578; 54°06′41″N 2°38′10″W	The tower at St Margaret's was built in 1514.	1071657	St Margaret's Church More images
St Oswald Vicarage	Warton	Vicarage	1. c. 1300; 2. 1824	2 May 1968	SD4990472303; 54°08′39″N 2°46′06″W	The vicarage was built c. 1300 and 1824. It is constructed of squared, coursed limestone.	1308862	St Oswald Vicarage More images
St Patrick's Chapel	Heysham	Chapel	8th or 9th century	29 December 1950	SD4099061657; 54°02′51″N 2°54′10″W	St Patrick's dates from the 8th or 9th century.	1208949	St Patrick's Chapel More images
St Peter's Church	Heysham	Church	14th century	29 December 1950	SD4104561650; 54°02′51″N 2°54′07″W	St Peter's was built in the 14th century.	1279836	St Peter's Church More images
St Wilfrid's Church	Melling	Church	Late 15th century	4 October 1967	SD5981571162; 54°08′05″N 2°36′59″W	St Wilfrid's was built in the late 15th century.	1165114	St Wilfrid's Church More images
Thurnham Hall	Thurnham, Lancaster	House	c. 1600	2 May 1968	SD4635054550; 53°59′03″N 2°49′11″W	Thurnham Hall was built c. 1600.	1317674	Thurnham Hall More images

== Pendle ==
Name	Location	Type	Completed	Date designated	Grid ref. Geo-coordinates	Notes	Entry number	Image
Church of St Mary le Gill	Barnoldswick	Church	Probably 15th and early 16th century	29 January 1988	SD8930548018; 53°55′41″N 2°09′52″W	St Mary Le Gill was probably built in the 15th and early 16th century.	1073421	Church of St Mary le Gill More images
St Bartholomew's Church	Colne	Church	Early 16th century	29 January 1988	SD8889540110; 53°51′26″N 2°10′13″W	St Bartholomew's was built in the early 16th century and is in the Perpendicular and Late Perpendicular styles.	1073414	St Bartholomew's Church More images
St Michael's Church	Bracewell and Brogden	Church	15th or early 16th century	29 January 1988	SD8630248454; 53°55′55″N 2°12′36″W	St Michael's was built mainly in the 15th or early 16th century.	1259162	St Michael's Church More images

== Preston ==
Name	Location	Type	Completed	Date designated	Grid ref. Geo-coordinates	Notes	Entry number	Image
Harris Museum	Preston	Museum	1882–93	12 June 1950	SD5405929424; 53°45′33″N 2°41′54″W	The Harris Public Library, Museum and Art Gallery was built 1882–93. It is constructed of sandstone ashlar.	1207306	Harris Museum More images
Old Lea Hall Farmhouse	Lea	Farmhouse	Late 17th or early 18th century.	11 November 1966	SD4822929822; 53°45′44″N 2°47′12″W	This farmhouse was built in the late 17th or early 18th century.	1361663	Old Lea Hall Farmhouse More images
Preston Cenotaph	Preston	War memorial	1926	20 December 1991	SD5389529482; 53°45′34″N 2°41′58″W	Memorial to the men of the town who died in the First and Second World Wars. By Sir Giles Gilbert Scott.	1218458	Preston Cenotaph More images
St Walburge's Church	Preston	Roman Catholic Church	1850–54	12 June 1950	SD5296129851; 53°45′46″N 2°42′54″W	St Walburge's Church was built 1850–54. The tower was added in 1857 and the spire in 1867. The spire rises to 309 feet (94 m) and is constructed of white limestone.	1207341	St Walburge's Church More images

== Ribble Valley ==
Name	Location	Type	Completed	Date designated	Grid ref. Geo-coordinates	Notes	Entry number	Image
All Hallows Church	Great Mitton	Church	Late 13th century	16 November 1954	SD7154738965; 53°50′46″N 2°26′02″W	All Hallows Church was built in late 13th century; the tower was added in the 15th century. It is constructed of sandstone rubble and has roofs of stone slate.	1163432	All Hallows Church More images
Browsholme Hall	Clitheroe	Manor House	Early 17th century	16 November 1954	SD6842545252; 53°54′09″N 2°28′55″W	Browsholme Hall was dates from the early 17th century. A wing was added to the east in the early 18th century. It is constructed of sandstone ashlar and has a slate roof. It has an H-plan and is on three storeys.	1072272	Browsholme Hall More images
Church of St Andrew	Slaidburn	Church	Early 15th and late 15th century	16 November 1954	SD7100352106; 53°57′51″N 2°26′36″W	St Andrew's was built in the early 15th and late 15th century.	1163738	Church of St Andrew More images
Church of St Mary and All Saints	Whalley	Church	1. 13th century 2. 15th century (additions)	13 February 1967	SD7325436180; 53°49′16″N 2°24′28″W	St Mary and All Saints dates from the 13th century with 15th century additions.	1164684	Church of St Mary and All Saints More images
Clitheroe Castle	Clitheroe	Castle	12th century	19 May 1950	SD7424541698; 53°52′15″N 2°23′35″W	Clitheroe Castle is a motte-and-bailey castle built in the 12th century. It has a small square tower keep with flat corner turrets.	1071553	Clitheroe Castle More images
Stonyhurst College	Stonyhurst	Public School	Late 16th century	29 December 1952	SD6904039065; 53°50′49″N 2°28′19″W	Stonyhurst College is a Roman Catholic private school built in the late 16th century. It is constructed of sandstone ashlar.	1419714	Stonyhurst College More images
Stonyhurst College Garden Pavilions	Stonyhurst	Wall	c. 1700	29 December 1952	SD6918138842; 53°50′42″N 2°28′12″W	Stonyhurst's two garden pavilions date from c. 1700.	1146979	Stonyhurst College Garden Pavilions
Gisburne Park	Gisburn	Country House	1727–36	16 November 1954	SD8253849709; 53°56′35″N 2°16′03″W	Gisburne Park was built 1727–36.	1317877	Gisburne Park More images
Hacking Hall with wall enclosing garden to north west	Billington	Cross Wing House	Early 17th century	27 August 1952	SD7093036903; 53°49′39″N 2°26′35″W	Hacking Hall was built in the early 17th century.	1072065	Hacking Hall with wall enclosing garden to north west More images
Hesketh End	Chipping	House	1. 1591; 2. Early 17th century	29 December 1952	SD6132741049; 53°51′51″N 2°35′22″W	Hesketh End dates from 1591, with additions in the early 17th century. It is constructed of coursed sandstone rubble.	1072316	Hesketh End More images
North West Gatehouse of Whalley Abbey	Whalley	Gatehouse	Early 14th century	13 February 1967	SD7290136178; 53°49′16″N 2°24′47″W	Whalley Abbey's gatehouse dates from the early 14th century.	1362365	North West Gatehouse of Whalley Abbey More images
Old St Leonard's Church	Langho, Billington	Church	1. 1557; 2. 1879 (restoration)	24 November 1966	SD7010735854; 53°49′05″N 2°27′20″W	Old St Leonard's was built in 1557 and restored in 1879.	1362341	Old St Leonard's Church More images
Sawley Abbey ruins	Sawley	Abbey	1147	16 November 1954	SD7765846410; 53°54′48″N 2°20′30″W	Sawley Abbey was a Cistercian abbey built in 1147.	1072099	Sawley Abbey ruins More images
St Peter and St Paul's Church	Bolton-by-Bowland	Church	Mid-15th century	16 November 1954	SD7864949388; 53°56′25″N 2°19′36″W	St Peter's and St Paul's dates from the mid-15th century.	1362287	St Peter and St Paul's Church More images
St Saviour's Church	Stydd	Church	Late 12th century	11 November 1966	SD6538435981; 53°49′08″N 2°31′38″W	St Saviour's was built in the late 12th century.	1147377	St Saviour's Church More images
St Wilfrid's Church	Ribchester	Church	1. 13th century 2. 14th century (porch and chapel); 3. 15th century (tower)	11 November 1966	SD6498335019; 53°48′37″N 2°32′00″W	St Wilfrid's was built 13th century with later additions; a chapel and porch were added in the 14th century and a west tower in the 15th century. It is constructed of sandstone rubble with stone slate roofs.	1147451	St Wilfrid's Church More images
Vicarage House	Wiswell	House	Early 17th century	13 February 1967	SD7450237353; 53°49′54″N 2°23′20″W	The vicarage was built in the early 17th century.	1362371	Vicarage House More images
Whalley Abbey	Whalley	Abbey	c. 1320	13 February 1967	SD7310436136; 53°49′15″N 2°24′36″W	Whalley Abbey, a Cistercian abbey, was built c. 1320. It was largely demolished following the Dissolution of the Monasteries in the 16th century.	1164643	Whalley Abbey More images

== South Ribble ==
Name	Location	Type	Completed	Date designated	Grid ref. Geo-coordinates	Notes	Entry number	Image
Church of St Leonard the Less	Samlesbury	Church	1. 12th century (remains); 2. 1558; 3. 1899 (additions)	11 November 1966	SD5898430353; 53°46′04″N 2°37′25″W	St Leonard the Less dates mostly from 1558, with 12th century remains.	1073063	Church of St Leonard the Less More images
Samlesbury Hall	Samlesbury	House	14th and 16th centuries	25 July 1952	SD6236530484; 53°46′10″N 2°34′21″W	Samlesbury Hall was built in the 14th and 16th centuries.	1361389	Samlesbury Hall More images

== West Lancashire ==
Name	Location	Type	Completed	Date designated	Grid ref. Geo-coordinates	Notes	Entry number	Image
Remains of Burscough Priory	Burscough	Augustinian Monastery	Late 12th century	11 May 1953	SD4340909944; 53°34′59″N 2°51′23″W	Burscough Priory was built in the late 12th century.	1196625	Remains of Burscough Priory More images
Church of St Thomas the Martyr	Upholland	Parish Church	14th century	7 January 1952	SD5231205106; 53°32′26″N 2°43′16″W	St Thomas' was built in the 14th century.	1201666	Church of St Thomas the Martyr More images
Rufford Old Hall	Rufford	House	Late 15th century	11 October 1968	SD4631816004; 53°38′16″N 2°48′48″W	Rufford Old Hall dates from the late 15th century.	1374141	Rufford Old Hall More images
Scarisbrick Hall	Scarisbrick	Country House	16th century	26 April 1963	SD3917112594; 53°36′23″N 2°55′15″W	Scarisbrick Hall was built in the 16th century.	1038565	Scarisbrick Hall More images
St Cuthbert's Church	Halsall	Church	Early 14th century	11 October 1968	SD3705510296; 53°35′08″N 2°57′08″W	St Cuthbert's was built in the early 14th century.	1073159	St Cuthbert's Church More images
St Michael's Church	Aughton	Church	14th century	11 October 1968	SD3914705417; 53°32′31″N 2°55′11″W	St Michael's was built in 14th century and has 12th and 13th century remains.	1361837	St Michael's Church More images

== Wyre ==
Name	Location	Type	Completed	Date designated	Grid ref. Geo-coordinates	Notes	Entry number	Image
St Helen's Church	Kirkland	Church	15th century	17 April 1967	SD4816242796; 53°52′44″N 2°47′24″W	St Helen's dates from the 15th century.	1072874	St Helen's Church More images
St Michael's Church	St Michael's on Wyre	Church	c. 1500	17 April 1967	SD4620241042; 53°51′46″N 2°49′10″W	St Michael's was built c. 1500.	1281178	St Michael's Church More images

== See also ==
- Grade II* listed buildings in Lancashire
- Grade I listed churches in Lancashire
- Scheduled monuments in Lancashire
