= Old Lea Hall Farmhouse =

Grade I listed house in Lancashire, United Kingdom

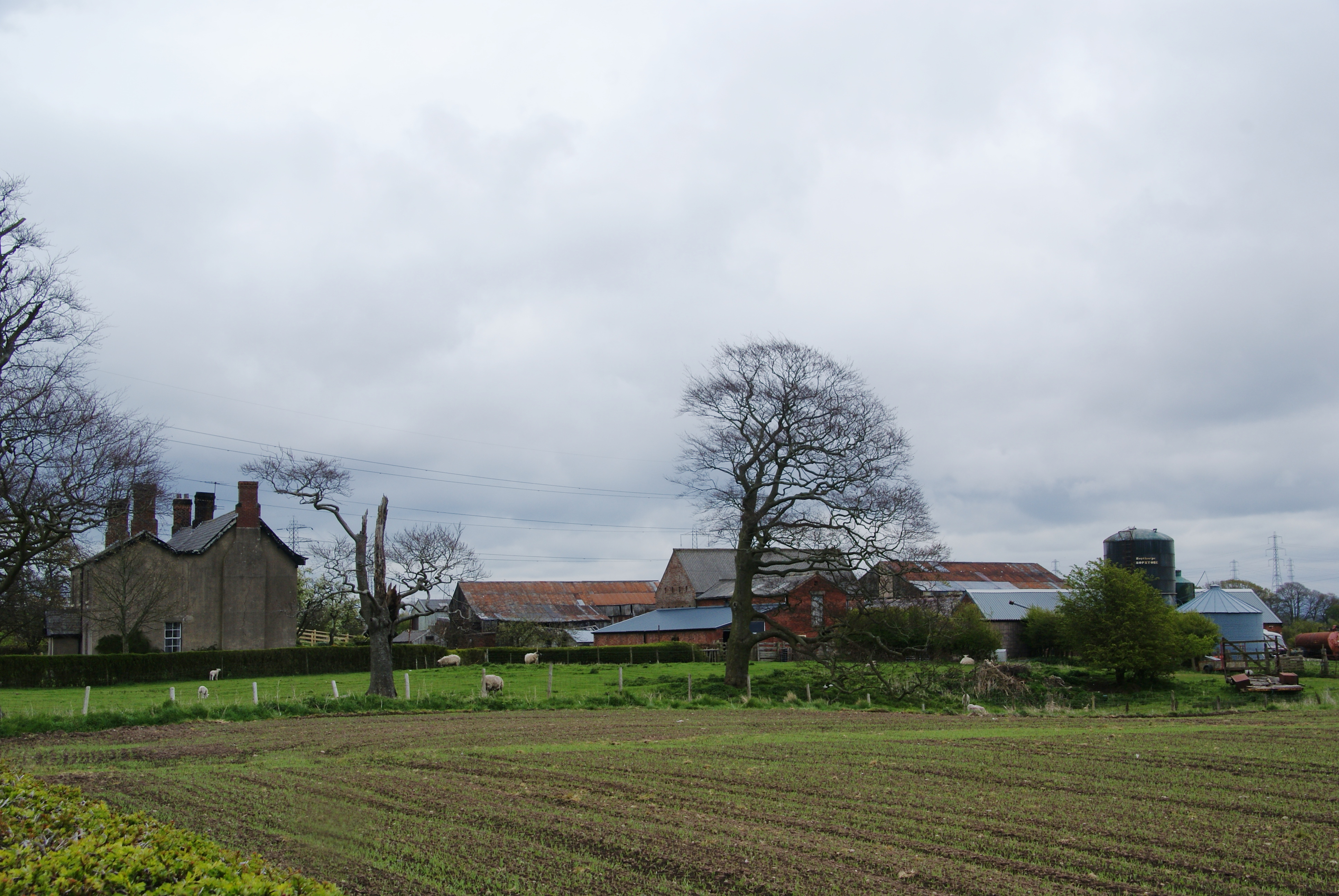
- The farmhouse is to the left of the image

- Location within Lancashire
- 53.7622°N 2.7868°W
- Type: Farmhouse
- Location: Lea, Lancashire

History
- Built: 17th - 18th centuries with 19th-century additions

Site notes
- Owner: Private

Listed Building – Grade I
- Official name: Old Lea Hall Farmhouse
- Designated: 11 November 1966
- Reference no.: 1361663

Listed Building – Grade II
- Official name: Stable Block circa 50m south of Old Lea Hall Farmhouse
- Designated: 13 January 1986
- Reference no.: 1073511

Listed Building – Grade II
- Official name: Barn circa 120m south-east of Old Lea Hall Farmhouse
- Designated: 13 January 1986
- Reference no.: 1317477

Old Lea Hall Farmhouse, Lea, Lancashire, England stands on the southern edge of the village, fronting Lea Marsh on the north bank of the River Ribble. The farmhouse dates from the late 16th or early 17th centuries, being the remnant of a much older, and larger, manor house of the de Hoghton family of Hoghton Tower. The farmhouse is a Grade I listed building. Other buildings within the complex have their own listings.

== History and description ==
The de Hoghton family had held land in Lancashire since the Middle Ages and oversaw their domain from their main seat, Hoghton Tower. The manor at Lea was a subsidiary holding and the current building comprises the domestic range of the older manor house. The Victoria County History for Lancashire records that Thomas Hoghton was killed at Lea in a family feud in 1589. (Note: The Historic England listing record for the house describes a "great affray" which culminated in Hoghton's death.) In 2022 the farmland at Lea was sold for residential development. The farmhouse remains a private residence and is not open to the public.

Clare Hartwell, in her Lancashire: North volume in the Buildings of England series, revised and reissued in 2009, describes Old Lea Hall as "exceptionally interesting". She suggests the original manor was likely built to a courtyard plan. Historic England records the building material as a timber frame which was encased with locally made brick. The farmhouse is of two storeys with a slate roof. The interior contains extensive 17th-century wood work. Old Lea Hall Farmhouse is a Grade I listed building. A stable block and a barn which form part of the farm complex are both listed at Grade II.

== See also ==
- Grade I listed buildings in Lancashire
- Listed buildings in Lea, Lancashire

== Sources ==
- Farrer, William; Brownbill, J. (1911). A History of the County of Lancaster. Victoria County History. Vol. 6. London: Victoria County History. OCLC 461209455.
- Hartwell, Clare; Pevsner, Nikolaus (2009). Lancashire: North. The Buildings of England. New Haven, US and London: Yale University Press. ISBN 978-0-300-12667-9. OCLC 262432356.
