= New St Leonard's Church, Langho =

Coordinates: 53.8102°N 2.4393°W

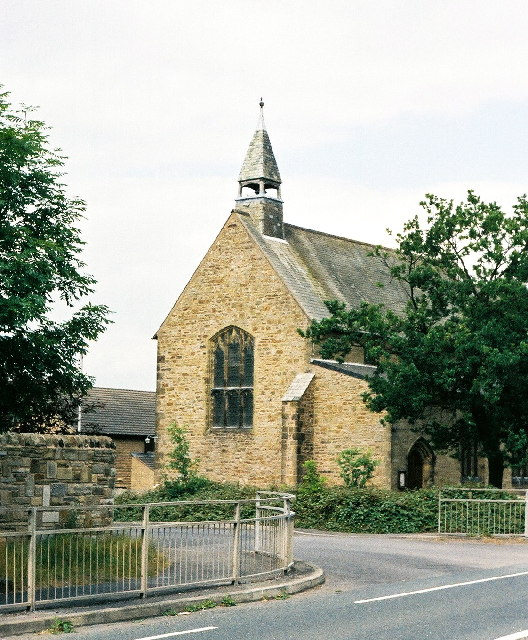
- West end of New St Leonard's Church, Langho

- Location in the Borough of Ribble Valley
- OS grid reference: SD 71170 34967
- Location: Between Langho and Billington, Lancashire
- Country: England
- Denomination: Anglican
- Website: St Leonard, Langho

History
- Status: Parish church
- Consecrated: 1880

Architecture
- Functional status: Active
- Architect: Paley and Austin
- Architectural type: Church
- Style: Gothic Revival
- Groundbreaking: 1879
- Completed: 1880
- Construction cost: £4,600

Administration
- Province: York
- Diocese: Blackburn
- Archdeaconry: Blackburn
- Deanery: Whalley
- Parish: Langho

New St Leonard's Church is in Whalley New Road, between the villages of Langho and Billington in Lancashire, England. It is an active Anglican parish church in the deanery of Whalley, the archdeaconry of Blackburn, and the diocese of Blackburn.

== History ==
The church was built in 1878–80 at a cost of £4,350 (equivalent to £480,000 in 2025). It was designed by the Lancaster architects Paley and Austin, and provided seating for 346 people. It was built to replace Old St Leonard's Church that was sited 1 mile (1.6 km) to the north. After the old church was built, the population had grown and become more concentrated around the railway to the south of the old church. The old church is now redundant, and is under the care of the Churches Conservation Trust, although occasional services are still held.

== Architecture ==
The plan of the church consists of a nave with a south aisle, and a chancel with a vestry to the north. At the west end is a slated bellcote. Under the east window is flushwork. Inside the church, between the nave and the aisle, is a four-bay arcade carried on clustered piers. The stained glass was made by Abbott and Company in 1935. The two-manual organ was built in 1882 by John Laycock of Keighley, and has since been overhauled by J. W. Walker.

== See also ==
- List of ecclesiastical works by Paley and Austin
