= Listed buildings in Warton, Lancaster =

Warton is a civil parish in Lancaster, Lancashire, England. It contains 29 listed buildings that are recorded in the National Heritage List for England. Of these, two are listed at Grade I, the highest of the three grades, and the others are at Grade II, the lowest grade. The parish contains the village of Warton and surrounding countryside. Most of the listed buildings are houses or farmhouses, the majority being on Main Street in the village. The Lancaster Canal runs through the parish, and a flight of locks is listed. The other listed buildings include a ruined rectory, a church, a public house, a milestone, and a disused limekiln.

== Key ==
Grade	Criteria
I	Buildings of exceptional interest, sometimes considered to be internationally important
II	Buildings of national importance and special interest

== Buildings ==
Name and location	Photograph	Date	Notes	Grade
Old Rectory; Main Street; 54.14424°N 2.76817°W		c. 1300	The old rectory is a ruin standing behind the present vicarage. It is in rubble with sandstone dressings, and consists of parts of the wall of a hall with service rooms, and the foundations of an east wing. The structure is also a Scheduled Monument.	I
St Oswald's Church; Main Street; 54.14419°N 2.76942°W		15th century	The church retains some 14th-century material, the north aisle was added in the 16th century, and the church was restored in 1892 by Paley, Austin and Paley. It is pebbledashed with sandstone dressings and a slate roof, and consists of a nave and chancel with a clerestory, aisles, and a west tower. The tower has angle buttresses and an embattled parapet with corner pinnacles.	II
Windsor House; 98 Main Street; 54.14467°N 2.76901°W		1630	The house is in pebbledashed stone with sandstone dressings and a slate roof. It is in two storeys with an attic. The windows are sashes, and there is a fire window with a triangular head. The doorway has a chamfered surround and a four-centred head.	II
74 and 76 Main Street; 54.14328°N 2.76873°W		1634	A pair of limestone houses with a slate roof in two storeys. No. 76 has a gabled porch and modern windows. No. 74 has sash windows, and single-storey canted bay window, a triangular-headed opening, and a doorway with an inscribed lintel. The rear is pebbledashed.	II
94 and 96 Main Street; 54.14453°N 2.76897°W		17th century	A pair of pebbledashed stone houses with sandstone dressings and a slate roof in two storeys with an attic. No. 96 has two bays, and No. 94 has one. The windows in No. 94 are modern, and those in No. 96 are sashes, apart from the central window in the top floor, which has a semicircular head. There is a later wing at the rear.	II
Washington House; 130 Main Street; 54.14568°N 2.76839°W		17th century	The house is in pebbledashed stone with sandstone dressings and a modern tile roof. It has two storeys and three bays. Most of the windows are sashes, and one is mullioned. The doorway has a chamfered surround. Flanking the central window in the upper floor are re-set datestones.	II
105 Main Street; 54.14587°N 2.76842°W		1664	A house with a cottage that has been incorporated into one house. The building was altered in 1849. It is in pebbledashed stone with a slate roof, and has two storeys. The main house has two bays, with the former cottage to the right. The windows are sashes, and the doorway has an inscribed battlemented lintel.	II
65 and 67 Main Street; 54.14400°N 2.76886°W		1674	A pair of pebbledashed stone houses with a slate roof in two storeys with an attic. The windows in No. 67 are sashes, and above the doorway is a moulded, inscribed and battlemented lintel. The doorway to No. 65 has a plain surround.	II
78 Main Street; 54.14335°N 2.76856°W		Late 17th century	A limestone house with sandstone dressings and a slate roof, in two storeys with an attic. The windows are mullioned, and in the centre is a porch. The doorway has chamfered jambs, and a battlemented lintel. To the right is a two-storey extension.	II
Tudor Cottage; 137 Main Street; 54.14787°N 2.76394°W		Late 17th century	The house is in pebbledashed stone with a slate roof. It has two storeys, and consists of a main part and a projecting extension to the left. On the front is a gabled stone porch. The windows are casements, and some mullions have been retained. There is an outshut to the rear.	II
Tewitfield Farmhouse; A6070 road 54.15904°N 2.74063°W	—	Early to mid 18th century	The farmhouse was extended to the right later in the 18th century. It is in rendered stone, with a roof of slate to the front and stone-slate to the rear. There are two storeys and three bays, and the windows are sashes.	II
5 Main Street; 54.14221°N 2.77593°W		Mid 18th century	A pebbledashed stone house with a slate roof in two storeys and two bays. The openings have plain surrounds, and the windows are sashes, one of which is mullioned.	II
61 and 63 Main Street; 54.14335°N 2.76894°W		1752	A pair of limestone cottages with sandstone dressings and a slate roof in two storeys with attics. The doorways are in the centre and have plain surrounds, and the windows are mullioned. Above the right doorway is an oval inscribed plaque.	II
68, 70 and 72 Main Street; 54.14311°N 2.76903°W		Late 18th century	Three houses in rendered stone with slate roofs and two storeys. The doorways have semicircular heads with raised keystones. Nos. 70 and 72 have a doorway to the left and a sash window to the right in each floor. No. 68 has a shop window in the ground floor and a double sash window above with a mullion.	II
168 Main Street; 54.14641°N 2.76684°W		Late 18th century	A pebbledashed stone house with a slate roof in two storeys. There is a sash window in each floor, and the doorway has a plain surround.	II
Dock Acres and barn Borwick Lane; 54.14848°N 2.74535°W	—	Late 18th century (probable)	Originally a house, later used as an office, it is in limestone with a slate roof. There are two storeys and an attic, and the central doorway is blocked. On the front is a Venetian window, and all the windows are sashed. To the right is an extension, and to the south is a barn with a wide entrance.	II
George Washington Inn; Main Street; 54.14492°N 2.76936°W		Late 18th century	A public house in rendered stone with a slate roof. It has two storeys with attics and a four-bay front. All the windows are sashes, and the doorway has a plain surround. At the rear are two gabled wings.	II
170 Main Street; 54.14642°N 2.76687°W		1796	A pebbledashed stone house with a slate roof in two storeys. In the ground floor is a doorway with a plain surround and a sash window. The upper floor contains a double sash window with a mullion.	II
Milestone; Milnthorpe Road, south of junction with Borwick Lane; 54.14876°N 2.74686°W	—	c. 1800	The milestone is in sandstone with cast iron plates. It has a triangular section and a circular base inscribed with the name of the parish. On the plates are the distances in miles to Burton-in-Kendal and to Lancaster.	II
Hyning Priory; Hyning Road; 54.15364°N 2.75678°W		1809	Originally a country house, it has since been used as a monastery. The original block has two storeys with an attic and three bays. A two-storey wing was added to the right in the mid-19th century, and a similar wing to the left in the mid-20th century. The building is in sandstone, the wings are stuccoed, and the roof is slated. Most of the windows are sashes, some with baseless Tuscan columns as mullions. To the left is the front of a pavilion that includes a Diocletian window and a pediment.	II
Tewitfield Locks; Lancaster canal, A6070 road54.15752°N 2.73779°W		1819	A flight of eight locks on the Lancaster Canal. They are in gritstone, but the wooden gates are missing.	II
St Oswald Vicarage; Main Street; 54.14410°N 2.76839°W		1824	The vicarage is a limestone house with a slate roof, in two storeys with a symmetrical three-bay front. The windows are sashes, and above the central doorway is a moulded cornice hood on fluted console brackets.	I
115 Main Street and barn 54.14619°N 2.76778°W		Early 19th century	The house is in pebbledashed stone with a slate roof, in two storeys with an attic, and with a symmetrical three-bay front. The central doorway has a cornice hood, and the first floor windows are sashes. The barn to the left is in limestone with a lower slate roof, and contains two segmental arched entrances, one of which is blocked.	II
148 Main Street; 54.14606°N 2.76758°W		Early 19th century	A pebbledashed stone house with a slate roof in two storeys and two bays. The windows are sashes. The doorway is in the right gable end, and has a re-set inscribed moulded and shaped lintel.	II
150 and 152 Main Street; 54.14614°N 2.76743°W		Early 19th century	A pair of limestone houses with a slate roof in two storeys. No. 152 has two bays, and No. 150 has one. The windows are sashes, and the doorways have fanlights and flat stone hoods on shaped brackets.	II
Boon Town Farmhouse; Main Street; 54.14774°N 2.76273°W	—	Early 19th century	The farmhouse is in limestone with a slate roof. It has two storeys and a symmetrical three-bay front. The central doorway has a plain surround and a flat cornice hood, and the windows are sashes.	II
Dale House; Burton Road; 54.15395°N 2.74178°W	—	1838	A pebbledashed house with sandstone dressings and a slate roof, in two storeys and three bays. In the centre is a projecting porch with panelled pilasters, a dentil course, and a cornice. The windows are sashes, and there is a lean-to extension with an inscribed plaque.	II
Keer Bridge House; Mill Lane; 54.13485°N 2.77057°W	—	Mid 19th century	The house is in limestone with a slate roof. There are two storeys and two bays. In the centre is a gabled porch. The windows on the front are mullioned, and on the rear they are sashes.	II
Limekiln; Crag Road; 54.14492°N 2.77289°W		Unknown	The limekiln is constructed in limestone and is built into the side of a hill. It has a square plan. On the front is a segmental vaulted opening, and on the top is a central flue hole.	II
