= Billington and Langho =

- Civil parish
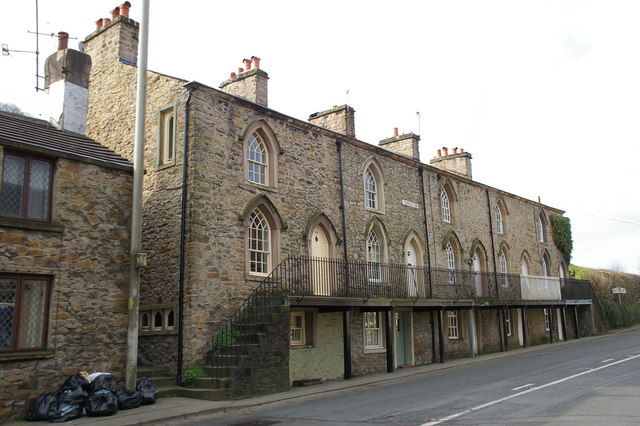
- 10–18 Terrace Row, a listed building in Billington

- Shown within Ribble Valley Shown within Lancashire
- Coordinates: 53.81°N 2.43°W
- Country: England
- Primary council: Ribble Valley
- County: Lancashire
- Status: Parish

Population (2011)
  - Total: 5,415
- with Dinckley

Billington and Langho is a civil parish in the Ribble Valley district of Lancashire, England, covering the villages of Billington and Langho and the hamlets of York and Old Langho and the gated community called Brockhall Village.

According to the 2001 census, the parish had a population of 4,555. However, the United Kingdom Census 2011 grouped the parish with Dinckley (2001 pop. 83), giving a total of 5,415.

== Schools ==
There are three schools in the Billington and Langho area, namely:

- St Augustine's RC High School, Billington
- St Leonard's Primary School
- St Mary's Primary School

== See also ==
- Listed buildings in Billington and Langho
