= Old St Leonard's Church, Langho =

Coordinates: 53.8182°N 2.4556°W

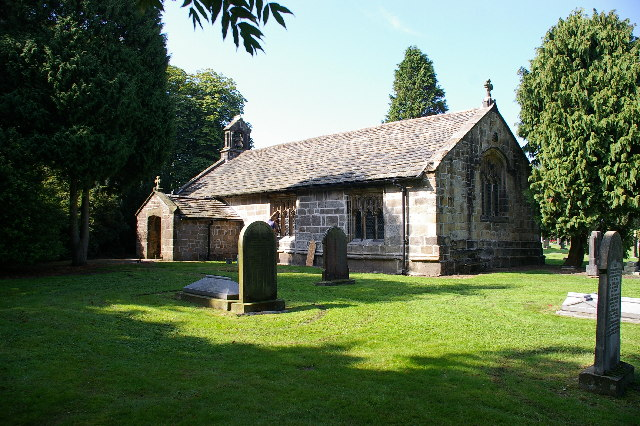
- Old St Leonard's Church, Langho, from the southeast

- Location in the Borough of Ribble Valley
- OS grid reference: SD 701 359
- Location: Langho, Lancashire
- Country: England
- Denomination: Anglican
- Website: Churches Conservation Trust

History
- Founded: 1557

Architecture
- Functional status: Redundant
- Heritage designation: Grade I
- Designated: 24 November 1966
- Architectural type: Church
- Style: Gothic
- Groundbreaking: 1557
- Completed: 1879

Specifications
- Materials: Sandstone, stone slate roof

Old St Leonard's Church is a redundant Anglican church 1 mile (1.6 km) northwest of the village of Langho, Lancashire, England. It is recorded in the National Heritage List for England as a designated Grade I listed building, and is under the care of the Churches Conservation Trust.

== History ==
The church was built in 1557, soon after the Reformation, at a time when few new churches were being built. It is thought that much of the stonework and some of the fittings came from nearby Whalley Abbey following the Dissolution of the Monasteries. The church was restored in 1879, when a vestry was added.

In 1880 a new church, also dedicated to St Leonard, was consecrated. The reason for relocation was because the population had grown and was more concentrated around the route taken by the railway in the villages of Billington and Langho. The original church is still used several times a year for special services. The old church was vested in the Trust on 1 July 1990.

== Architecture ==
St Leonard's is constructed in sandstone with a stone slate roof. Its plan is simple, consisting of a nave with a continuous chancel, a north vestry and a south porch. On the gable at the west end is a bell cote and on the east gable is a cross. The west window has four lights with Perpendicular tracery. In the north and south walls are two three-light windows, and the east window, which dates from the 19th century, also has three lights. In the south wall is a piscina, and projecting from the north wall is a stoup.

== External features ==
The churchyard contains war graves of a soldier and an airman of World War I.

== See also ==
- Grade I listed buildings in Lancashire
- Listed buildings in Billington and Langho
- List of churches preserved by the Churches Conservation Trust in Northern England
- New St Leonard's Church, Langho
