= Listed buildings in Hoghton =

Hoghton is a civil parish in the Borough of Chorley, Lancashire, England. It contains 16 buildings that are recorded in the National Heritage List for England as designated listed buildings. Of these, two are listed at Grade I, the highest of the three grades, and the others are at Grade II, the lowest grade. The major building in the parish is Hoghton Tower; this and associated structures are listed. Otherwise the parish in mainly rural, and a number of farmhouses and farm buildings are listed. The other listed buildings consist of two churches, a former school, a war memorial, and a railway viaduct.

== Key ==
Grade	Criteria
I	Buildings of exceptional interest, sometimes considered to be internationally important
II	Buildings of national importance and special interest

== Buildings ==
Name and location	Photograph	Date	Notes	Grade
Barn and pig sties, Causeway Farm; 53.72428°N 2.56391°W	—	16th century (possible)	The barn is cruck-framed with sandstone cladding, weatherboarding of the north gable, and a slate roof, and has four bays. At the north end is a sandstone lean-to, and a row of four pig sties with a stone-slate roof. Inside the barn are four full cruck trusses, and the remains of timber-framed walling.	II
Hoghton Tower; 53.73290°N 2.57348°W		1562–65	A mansion house that was later altered and extended, in sandstone with stone-slate roofs. The house has a double courtyard plan, and is entered through an embattled gatehouse with a central tower. The inner courtyard is also entered by a gateway, and has a great hall, a kitchen, state rooms, and living rooms, all mainly in two storeys.	I
Causeway Farmhouse; 53.72474°N 2.56353°W	—	Early 17th century (probable)	The farmhouse is in rendered brick on a stone plinth with a slate roof. It is in two storeys and has an L-shaped plan, consisting of a three-bay main range, and a single-bay wing at the front of the first bay. There is a full-height porch in the angle, and an outshut at the rear of the house. Some of the windows are mullioned; others have been altered. Inside are timber-framed partitions.	II
Coach house and stable, Hoghton Tower; 53.73300°N 2.57441°W	—	17th century	The former coach house and stable have been altered for other uses. The building is in sandstone with a stone-slate roof and it has two storeys. On the ridge is a louvred lantern, and on the gables are ball finials. Screen walls run from the south and east sides. Openings include doorways, windows, some of which are mullioned, and ventilation slits.	II
Bolton Hall Farmhouse; 53.74375°N 2.57104°W	—	Late 17th century (probable)	A stone farmhouse with a stone-slate roof, in two storeys with a symmetrical two-bay front. On the front is a single-storey gabled porch. Many of the windows are mullioned, and at the rear is an extension. Inside are thick stone walls.	II
Great Barn, Hoghton Tower; 53.73302°N 2.57531°W		1692	The barn is integrated with a carthouse at the east end. It is in sandstone and has a stone-slate roof with ball finials. The barn has seven bays, on the front of which is a three-bay full-height porch with segmental-headed arches, above which is a datestone. The building includes wagon entrances, doorways, a mullioned window and other windows, and ventilation slits.	I
Lane Side Farmhouse; 53.73251°N 2.58697°W	—	c. 1700	Originally a farmhouse, the house is in sandstone with a slate roof. It has two storeys, and an almost symmetrical two-bay front. On the front is a doorway with a large lintel and a canopy, and casement windows. At the rear is a two-storey extension, also with a canopied doorway.	II
Dover Farmhouse; 53.72630°N 2.58394°W		Early 18th century	A sandstone farmhouse with a stone-slate roof, it has two storeys and is in two bays, On the front is a gabled single-storey porch and mullioned windows. There is an extension to the rear of the first bay.	II
Ward's o'th' Hill Farmhouse; 53.72861°N 2.58537°W	—	Early 18th century (probable)	A sandstone farmhouse with a slate roof, in two storeys. There are three bays, the first bay being lower. On the front is a plain doorway in the first bay, and a modern brick lean-to porch to the right. Most of the windows are mullioned. Attached to the north end is a granary with external steps leading up to a loft doorway.	II
Gate piers, Hoghton Tower; 53.73240°N 2.57586°W	—	18th century (possibly)	There are two inner and two outer sandstone gate piers. They are tall, square and rusticated, and have cornices, plain friezes, and prominent moulded caps. Between the inner and outer piers on each side are low walls.	II
Vale House Farmhouse; 53.73566°N 2.56808°W	—	Late 18th century	A sandstone house, later a farmhouse, with a roof partly in slate and partly in stone-slate. It has three storeys with cellars, and a symmetrical three-bay front. On the front is a central doorway with a fanlight, and sash windows. At the rear is a tall stairlight, two mulliond windows, and a single storey extension.	II
Methodist Chapel; 53.73674°N 2.57544°W		1794	The Methodist chapel was extended to the east in the 19th century, but is no longer in use as a chapel. It is in sandstone with a Welsh slate roof. It has two storeys, and an L-shaped plan, consisting of a main block of five bays, and a rear two-bay extension. Above the doorway is a semicircular tympanum with an inscription. Attached to the chapel is a boundary wall with stone gate piers and ornamental gates.	II
Holy Trinity Church; 53.72813°N 2.58503°W		1822–23	A Commissioners' church designed by Robert Roper, but almost completely rebuilt in about 1887 by James Bertwistle, who added the tower, the chancel, and the south aisle. The church is built in stone with a slate roof. It consists of a nave, a south aisle, a chancel, and a west tower, and it is mainly in Early English style with some Perpendicular features. The tower has three stages, with buttresses, a stair turret, a north doorway, a west window, two clock faces, and an embattled parapet. Inside the church are memorials to members of the de Hoghton family of Hoghton Tower.	II
Holy Trinity School; 53.72817°N 2.58409°W	—	1838	The school replaced an earlier school on the site. It was designed by Edmund Sharpe in Tudor style, enlarged in 1873, and later used as a house. The building is in sandstone with a slate roof, it has two storeys and three bays, with a single-storey extension at each end, and a single-storey wing at the rear. There are buttresses on the sides and corners, finials on the gables, and the windows are mullioned. In the north gable end is a two-storey porch, and there is a lean-to porch with a Tudor arched doorway on the east side.	II
Hoghton Tower viaduct 53.73226°N 2.56449°W		1844–46	The viaduct was built to carry the Preston and Blackburn Railway over the River Darwen. It is in sandstone, and has three semicircular spans each of 65 feet (20 m). These are carried on two rectangular piers, the track being about 116 feet (35 m) above the river bed.	II
War memorial 53.73017°N 2.58660°W		1924	The war memorial stands in an enclosure opposite the entrance to Hoghton Tower. It is in limestone, and in the form of a wayside cross, with a base of four square steps, a square plinth rising to become octagonal, and an octagonal shaft carrying a square shrine with a pitched roof and angle buttresses. Each face of the shrine has a niche containing a carving; one depicts the Crucifixion, another contains a statue of Saint George, and the others have tracery and a shield. On each face of the plinth is a slate plaque with inscriptions and the names of those lost in the two World Wars.	II
