= Old Rectory, Warton =

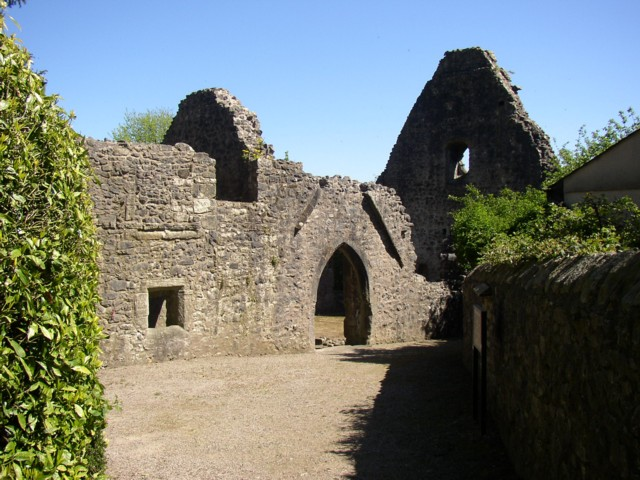
- The entrance to the Old Rectory, Warton

- Location within the City of Lancaster district
- 54.1443°N 2.7683°W
- Location: Warton, Lancashire

Scheduled monument
- Official name: Warton Old Rectory
- Designated: 30 November 1925

Listed Building – Grade I
- Official name: Old Rectory
- Designated: 2 May 1968

The Old Rectory (also known as Parsonage Court) is a ruin of a former rectory in the village of Warton, near Lancaster, Lancashire, England. Owned by the Yearron/Bell family and under the protection of English Heritage, it has been designated a Scheduled Ancient Monument and Grade I listed building.

The rectory is believed to have been built in the early 14th century as the residence of the rector of the parish of St Oswald's, Warton, probably by two younger sons of Marmaduke, Lord Thweng. Manorial courts were also held here. The walls are of limestone rubble with sandstone dressings, and a cross passage originally separated the full-height great hall on the southern side from service rooms and a first floor chamber at the other end of the house. The doorway at the eastern end of the cross passage is interpreted as the main entrance, while the western one led into a garden, and both originally had a porch. A doorway in the northern gable wall led into a courtyard with an external kitchen and a well. In the south-west corner of the great hall is a doorway that led to another building which survives as part of the modern vicarage. The southern gable had an ogee quatrefoiled window under the apex to provide light.

It is not known exactly when the rectory was abandoned, after being replaced by a new rectory, but it was a ruin by 1721. Some time later, a cottage was constructed in the north end of the ruin, which was occupied well into the 20th century, however these additions have since been removed. The ruin is considered to be well preserved, with the gables surviving to almost their full height. It is open to visitors, free of charge.

== Media galley ==
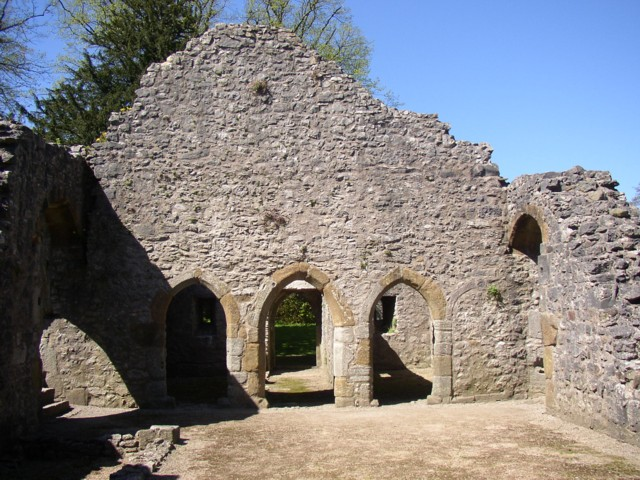
Arched doorways

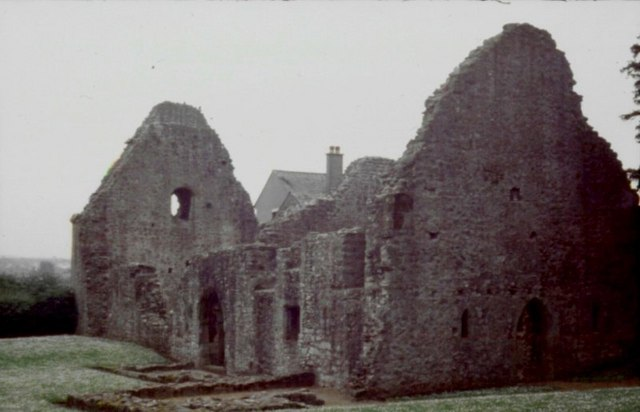
Taken in 1992

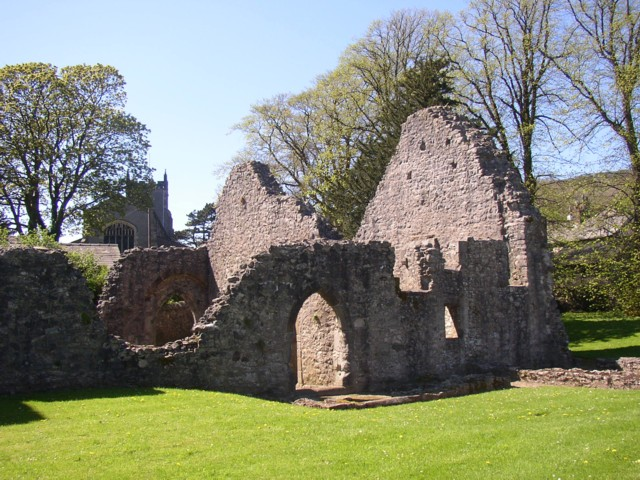
The ruins with St Oswald's Church in the background

== See also ==
- Grade I listed buildings in Lancashire
- Scheduled monuments in Lancashire
- Listed buildings in Warton, Lancaster
