= Dinckley =

Village in Lancashire, England

Coordinates: 53.818°N 2.473°W

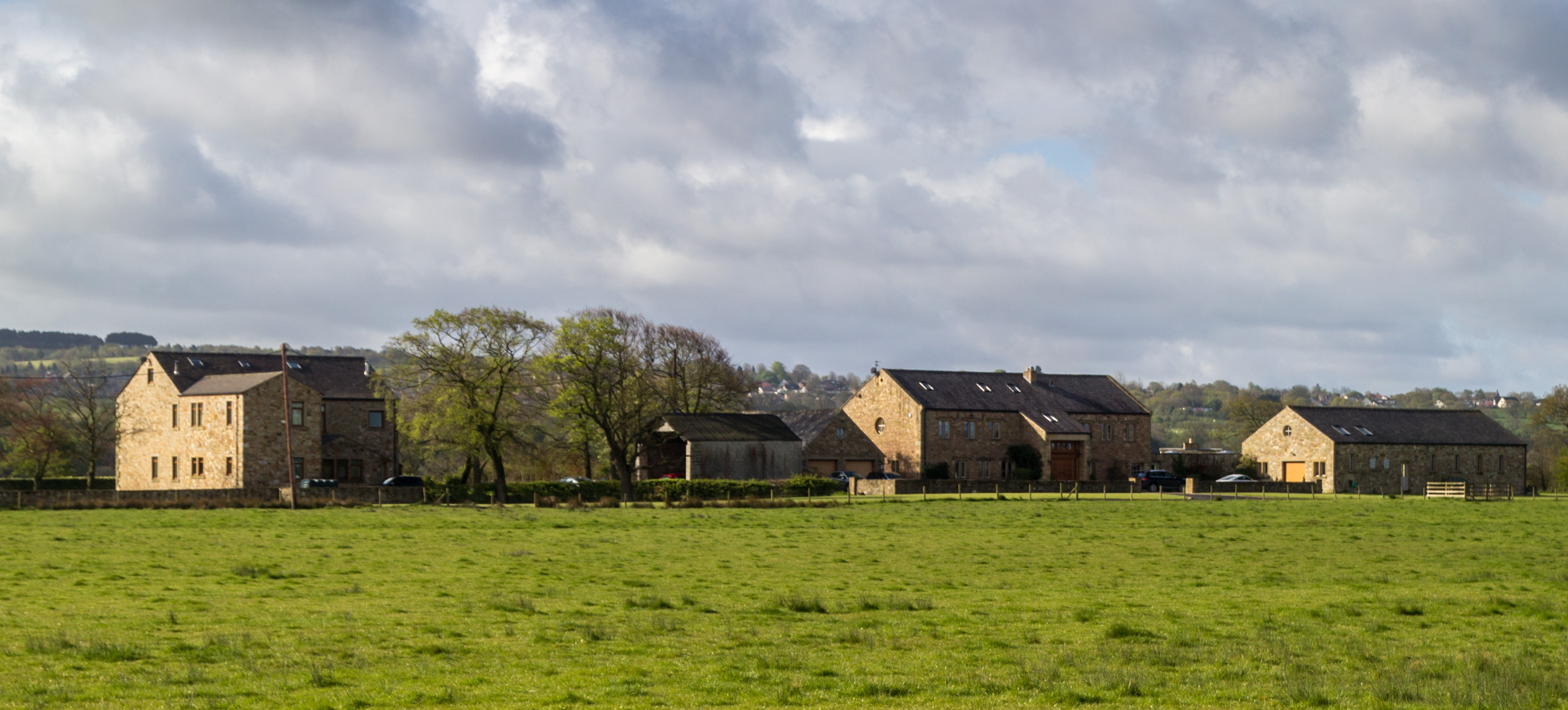
- Dinckley Grange

- Shown within Ribble Valley Location within Lancashire
- Population: 83 (2001 Census)
- OS grid reference: SD688358
- Civil parish: Dinckley
- District: Ribble Valley
- Shire county: Lancashire
- Region: North West
- Country: England
- Sovereign state: United Kingdom
- Post town: BLACKBURN
- Postcode district: BB6
- Dialling code: 01254
- Police: Lancashire
- Fire: Lancashire
- Ambulance: North West
- UK Parliament: Ribble Valley

Dinckley is a small village and civil parish located in the Ribble Valley, in Lancashire, England. Owing to the limited extent of the population details from the Census 2011 are maintained within the civil parish of Billington and Langho. The parish is situated on the south side of the River Ribble, 6 miles (9.7 km) north of Blackburn. The northern boundary of the parish is formed by the River Ribble, and the eastern boundary by Park Brook and Dinckley Brook. The parish is part of the Langho ward, which is represented on Ribble Valley Borough Council by two councillors, both from the Conservative Party.

Dinckley Ferry was a rowing boat which crossed the river connecting the village to Hurst Green. The ferry was replaced by a suspension bridge in the 1950s.

== Toponymy ==
The name Dinckley is first attested in 1246, in the forms Dunkthele, Dinkedelay, and Dinkidele, along with Dinkedelegh in 1257. It comes from the Common Brittonic words corresponding to modern Welsh din ("fort") and coed ("woodland"); thus the first part of the name once meant "fort by the wood". Old English-speakers later took this name as the basis for a new one ending in the Old English word lēah ("cleared land in woodland"); that name thus meant "the cleared land at Dincoed".

== Listed building ==
There is one listed building in the parish; this is Dinckley Hall which is listed at Grade II*. The house basically has a cruck frame, its exterior was originally timber-framed, and it was subsequently encased in sandstone and brick. It consists of a hall and a cross wing, there are two storeys, and it contains mullioned and transomed windows.
