= York, Lancashire =

Hamlet in Lancashire, England

Coordinates: 53.798°N 2.442°W

York
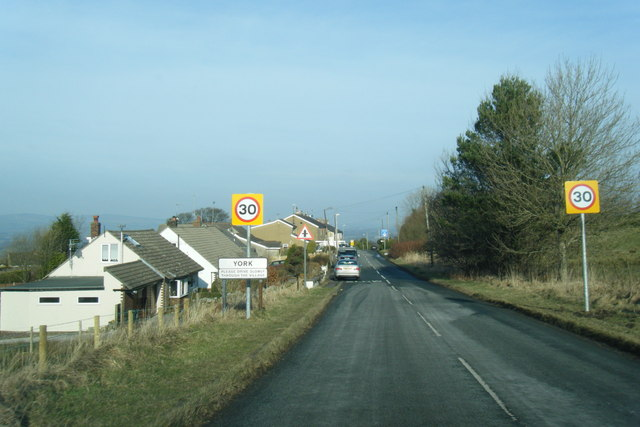
- Whalley Old Road at York village boundary

- Shown within Ribble Valley Location within Lancashire
- OS grid reference: SD708336
- Civil parish: Billington and Langho
- District: Ribble Valley
- Shire county: Lancashire
- Region: North West
- Country: England
- Sovereign state: United Kingdom
- Post town: BLACKBURN
- Postcode district: BB6
- Dialling code: 01254
- Police: Lancashire
- Fire: Lancashire
- Ambulance: North West
- UK Parliament: Ribble Valley

York is a hamlet in the Ribble Valley district of the county of Lancashire, England. Part of the Billington and Langho civil parish, it is located southeast of the village of Langho on the old turnpike road between Whalley and Blackburn. For transport there is the A666 road and Langho railway station nearby. There is a pub, the Lord Nelson, with an old stone well opposite. The route of an old road to Whalley passes along the hillside above the current road and joins the Old Nab Road. A rocky outcrop easily accessible by walking directly uphill from the crossroads is a good spot for a picnic with a fine view over the Ribble Valley, and for low level bouldering. On a very clear day you can see Blackpool Tower.
