= Listed buildings in Lea, Lancashire =

Lea is a civil parish in Lancashire, England. It contains 12 buildings that are recorded in the National Heritage List for England as designated listed buildings. Of these, one is listed at Grade I, the highest of the three grades, and all the others are at Grade II. The parish is partly residential, but mainly rural, and the Lancaster Canal runs through it. Four bridges crossing the canal are listed, the other listed buildings being houses, farmhouses and associated structures, and a cross that probably has a medieval origin.

== Key ==
Grade	Criteria
I	Buildings of exceptional interest, sometimes considered to be internationally important
II	Buildings of national importance and special interest

== Buildings ==
Name and location	Photograph	Date	Notes	Grade
Cross; 53.77407°N 2.79583°W		Medieval (probable)	A restored stone cross standing on a shaped boulder that is probably medieval.	II
Old Lea Hall Farmhouse; 53.76216°N 2.78665°W		16th century (probable)	A farmhouse developed from the domestic wing of a former medieval manor house of the De Hoghton family. It is basically timber-framed on a stone plinth, and was later encased in brick, and has a slate roof. The house is in two storeys with an attic, and the windows are sashes. There is an extension dating from the early 19th century.	I
Barn, Old Lea Hall Farm; 53.76188°N 2.78514°W	—	Early 17th century (probable)	The barn has been altered and reconstructed. It is built in a combinations of brick and sandstone, and has a roof of slate and stone-slate. The barn is in seven bays, and it walls contain ventilation slits.	II
Stable block, Old Lea Hall Farm; 53.76186°N 2.78641°W		Early 17th century (probable)	The stable block is in brick on a sandstone plinth, it has some stone quoins, and a corrugated sheet roof. The stable block has a rectangular plan and is in two storeys. It contains various openings, including doorways, some of which are blocked or altered, and ventilation slits.	II
Leyland Bridge Farmhouse; 53.77416°N 2.76474°W	—	1651	The former farmhouse is rendered and has a thatched roof. It is in 1 1/2 storeys, and has a front of three bays. In the front is a gabled porch with a datestone. The windows are casements, and there are two dormers. Inside the house is an inglenook.	II
Raikes Farmhouse (part); 53.77164°N 2.79763°W	—	Late 17th century (probable)	This part of the farmhouse was originally timber-framed with crucks, and has since been recased in brick. An extension was added to the southeast in the 19th century. The building is in a single storey and has two bays.	II
Barn, New Hall Farm; 53.76293°N 2.77480°W	—	c. 1700	The barn is in brick on a sandstone plinth and has sandstone quoins and a stone-slate roof. It has a rectangular plan, and is in five bays. There are wagon openings, one of which is blocked, ventilation slits, and on the north gable are ball finials.	II
Canal Bridge No. 17 (Valentine House Bridge); 53.77766°N 2.75580°W		1790s	An accommodation bridge over the Lancaster Canal, for which the engineer was John Rennie. It is built in sandstone and consists of a single elliptical arch with triple keystones, parapets, and pilasters at the ends.	II
Canal Bridge No. 18; 53.77902°N 2.77010°W		1790s	The bridge carries Lea Road over the Lancaster Canal, for which the engineer was John Rennie. It is built in sandstone and consists of a single elliptical arch with triple keystones, parapets, and pilasters at the ends.	II
Canal Bridge No. 19 (Quaker's Bridge); 53.77850°N 2.77444°W		1790s	The bridge carries Sidgreaves Lane over the Lancaster Canal, for which the engineer was John Rennie. It is built in sandstone and consists of a single elliptical arch with triple keystones, parapets, and pilasters at the ends.	II
Canal Bridge No. 22; 53.77863°N 2.79269°W		c. 1797	The bridge carries Lea Lane over the Lancaster Canal, for which the engineer was John Rennie. It is built in sandstone and consists of a single elliptical arch with triple keystones, parapets with rounded coping, and pilasters at the ends.	II
Clock House; 53.78046°N 2.77226°W	—	Early 19th century	A brick house with rusticated quoins and a slate roof. It has a double pile plan, is in two storeys, and has a symmetrical two-bay front. The central doorway has a semicircular fanlight and a doorcase with Tuscan columns and an open pediment. The windows are sashes.	II
