= Hacking Hall =

Building in Lancashire, England

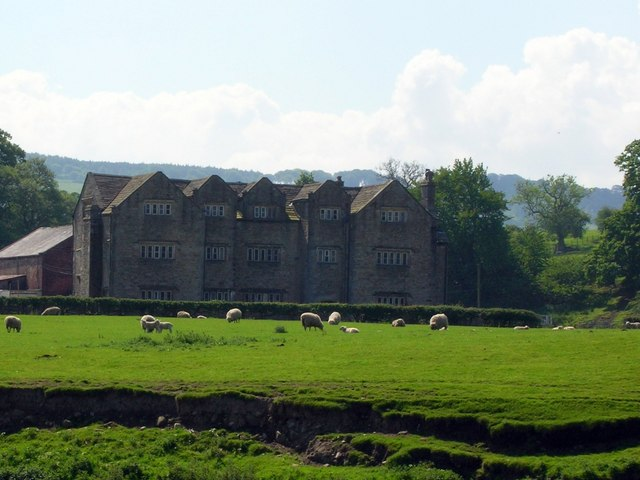

- Location within the Borough of Ribble Valley

General information
- Location: England
- Coordinates: 53.8276°N 2.4431°W
- Opened: 1607

Technical details
- Material: Sandstone rubble with stone slate roof
- Floor count: 3

Listed Building – Grade I
- Official name: Hacking Hall with wall enclosing garden to north west
- Designated: 27 August 1952
- Reference no.: 1072065

Hacking Hall is a Grade I listed, early-17th-century house situated at the confluence of the rivers Calder and Ribble in Lancashire, England.

It is thought that J. R. R. Tolkien, author of The Lord of the Rings, may have taken inspiration from the ferry here for the Bucklebury Ferry over the Brandywine river in his book, as it was still operational when Tolkien visited nearby Stonyhurst College.

== See also ==
- Grade I listed buildings in Lancashire
- Listed buildings in Billington and Langho
