= Brockhall Village =

Village in Lancashire, England

Coordinates: 53.823°N 2.454°W

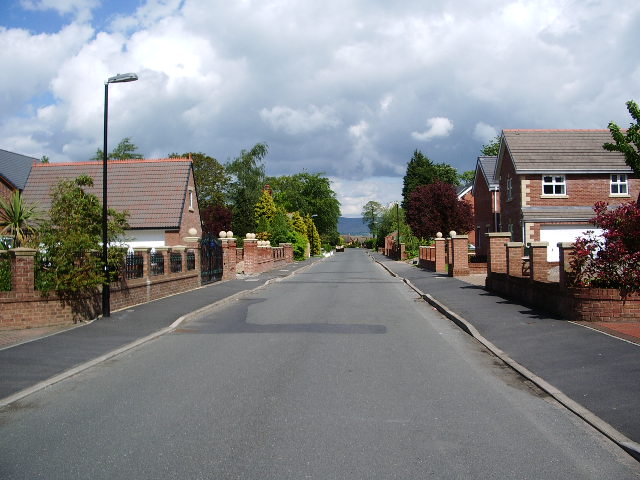
- The Drive, Brockhall Village

- Shown within Ribble Valley Location within Lancashire
- OS grid reference: SD701364
- Civil parish: Billington and Langho
- District: Ribble Valley
- Shire county: Lancashire
- Region: North West
- Country: England
- Sovereign state: United Kingdom
- Post town: BLACKBURN
- Postcode district: BB6
- Dialling code: 01254
- Police: Lancashire
- Fire: Lancashire
- Ambulance: North West
- UK Parliament: Ribble Valley

Brockhall Village is a gated community in the Ribble Valley, Lancashire, England. The village is in the civil parish of Billington and Langho and is 7 miles (11 km) north of Blackburn.

Developed during the 1990s by property entrepreneur Gerald Hitman, Brockhall Village occupies the site of a former mental hospital and is the home of the training facilities for Blackburn Rovers F.C. Homes on the estate are among the most expensive in Lancashire.

== History ==
=== Brockhall Hospital ===
Brockhall Village is based at the former site of Brockhall Hospital, which was built in 1904 as an Inebriate Women's Reformatory a short distance north of Old Langho. Later becoming a hospital for people with learning disabilities, it was one of the largest mental institutions in Europe, housing 3,500 patients on 42 acres of grounds.

The hospital was closed by the NHS in 1992 as part of the government's Care in the Community policy. Following the closure of the hospital, local planners were open to proposals to redevelop the area.

=== Development ===
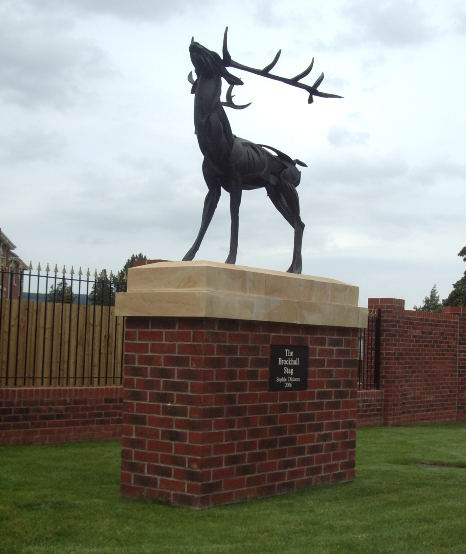
The Brockhall Stag sculpture

Property tycoon Gerald Hitman, who had made his money buying and selling leaseholds in the North East, bought a package of deeds to properties in Lancashire in 1982, among which was the 999-year lease to Brockhall Hospital. When the hospital closed, his proposal to replace the "150 nondescript, functional buildings" with a gated community of 400 homes was successful.

Blackburn Rovers F.C. were one of the earliest occupants of Brockhall and had transitioned their training facilities to the site by 1995. Development was still in its early stages at this time, with the location described in The Guardian as a "forbidding complex of barrack blocks, barriers and brick chimneys which once housed the mentally afflicted".

When planning permission was granted in 1994 it was on the condition that Brockhall Village be a mixed development with both housing and opportunities for employment. This planning permission was revised in 1999 to provide for a greater proportion of housing. However, in 2005 a plan to build two apartment blocks was rejected on the grounds it encroached too far on land reserved for commercial use. In 2010, plans to convert the village hall into a shop were approved, despite objections from some residents, who felt it might attract outsiders.

In February 2021 Blackburn Rovers announced plans to demolish their senior training centre and construct 170 new homes, which they later abandoned after pressure from residents. The plans would have seen the senior and academy centre combined into a single "state of the art" facility. In June 2021, ownership of the senior training centre was transferred to Venkateshwara London Limited, a new company set up by club owners Venky's.

=== The Old Zoo ===
Hitman also built his own unique home on the edge of the development, The Old Zoo. So-called because the site was once a petting zoo for the psychiatric patients at the hospital, the final design was chosen after a competition organised by RIBA. The completed house, which rests against the sloping hillside and features unusual irregular shaped rooms, a 10 ft square front door and flat rooflines, received praise from architectural critics and was described by Giles Worsley as "the most radical house in England".
