= Hesketh End =

House in Lancashire, England

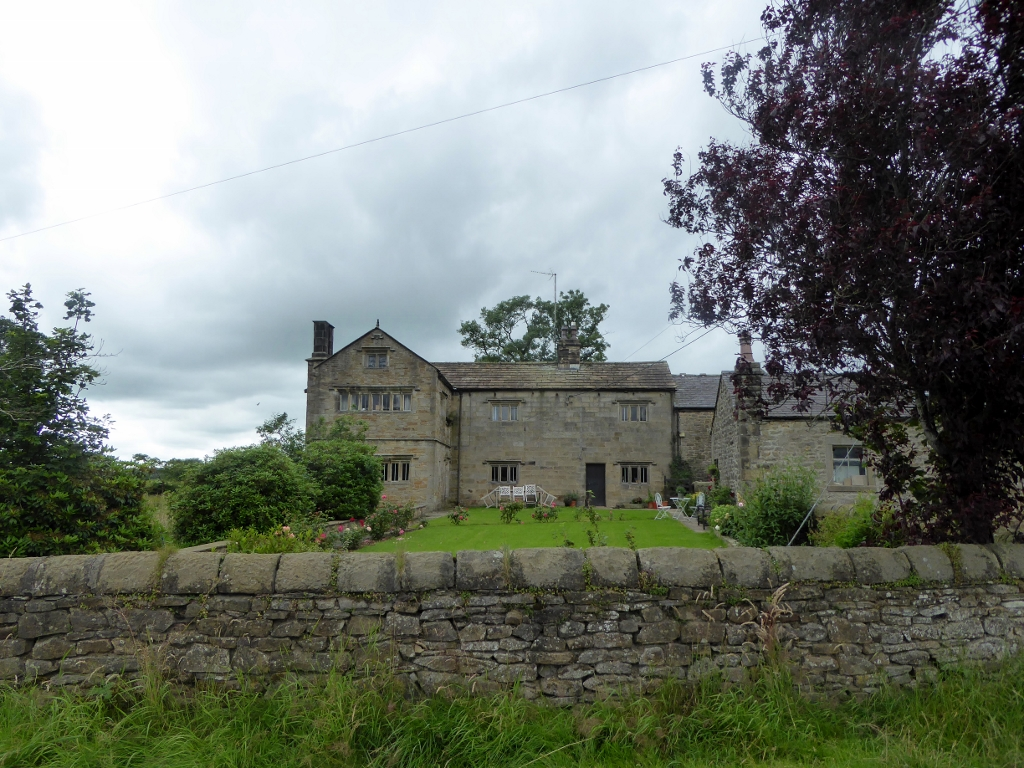
- The building in 2015
- Interactive map of the Hesketh End area

General information
- Location: Chipping, Lancashire, England
- Coordinates: 53.864206°N 2.589539°W
- Completed: 1591 (435 years ago)

Technical details
- Floor count: 3

Listed Building – Grade I
- Designated: 29 December 1952
- Reference no.: 1072316

Hesketh End is an historic building in the English village of Chipping, Lancashire. Built in 1591, with later additions made in the early 17th century, it is now a Grade I listed building.

== See also ==
- Grade I listed buildings in Lancashire
