= Listed buildings in Billington and Langho =

Billington and Langho is a civil parish in Ribble Valley, Lancashire, England. It contains nine listed buildings that are recorded in the National Heritage List for England. Of these, two are listed at Grade I, the highest of the three grades, one is at Grade II*, the middle grade, and the others are at Grade II, the lowest grade. The parish contains the villages of Billington and Langho, and is otherwise mainly rural. The listed buildings are houses, farmhouses, a farm building, and a church.

== Key ==
Grade	Criteria
I	Buildings of exceptional interest, sometimes considered to be internationally important
II*	Particularly important buildings of more than special interest
II	Buildings of national importance and special interest

== Buildings ==
Name and location	Photograph	Date	Notes	Grade
Chapel of St Leonard; 53.81818°N 2.45557°W		1557	The church, restored in 1879 and since redundant, is in sandstone with a stone-slate roof, and it incorporates items from other buildings. The church consists of a nave, a chancel, a north vestry, and a south porch. There is a bellcote on the apex of the west gable. Most of the windows contain Perpendicular tracery, and there is one mullioned window.	I
Hacking Barn; 53.82890°N 2.43989°W	—	c. 1600	A cruck barn, its original timber-framing replaced by sandstone and modern timber. The roof is of asbestos sheet. There is a doorway with a chamfered surround and a Tudor arched head, and inside the barn are six cruck trusses.	II*
Potter Ford Farmhouse; 53.82676°N 2.43698°W	—	1610	The house is in sandstone with a slate roof in two storeys. The main range has three bays with modern windows. To the left is a cross wing with mullioned windows, and inside it is a timber-framed wall.	II
Hacking Hall and garden wall 53.82761°N 2.44311°W		Early 17th century	A country house in sandstone with stone-slate roofs, in two storeys with attics. It consists of a central range with three gables, flanked by gabled cross wings. The windows are mullioned, and there is a doorway with a moulded surround and a Tudor arched head. On the east side is a corbelled garderobe projection, and inside the house is timber-framed partitioning. The stone wall enclosing the garden is included in the listing.	I
Lower Woodcock Farmhouse; 53.80126°N 2.45045°W	—	1671	The farmhouse was extended to the east in 1764. It is in sandstone with a slate roof and has two storeys. The windows are mullioned, and inside the original part is a wattle and daub dividing wall.	II
Mytton Fold Farmhouse; 53.80793°N 2.43971°W	—	1702	A sandstone house with a slate roof in two storeys and two bays. The windows are mullioned, and the doorway has a chamfered surround and an inscribed lintel.	II
Rileys Farmhouse; 53.80954°N 2.46419°W	—	Early to mid 18th century	The house is in sandstone with a stone-slate roof in two storeys. Most of the windows are mullioned, and on the front is a modern glazed porch. There is a single-bay extension to the left.	II
10–18 Terrace Row; 53.81842°N 2.40804°W		c. 1830	A row of five sandstone houses with a slate roof on a sloping site. There are three storeys on the front with a first floor walkway leading to the doors and approached by steps at each end. Each house has one bay, with a sash window containing Gothick tracery on the upper floors. The doorways and windows have chamfered surrounds and pointed heads. In the ground floor each house has a door and a window with a plain surround.	II
The Marjorie and Calder Cottage; 53.81805°N 2.40616°W		c. 1830	Originally a row of houses, later divided into two dwellings, they are in pebbledashed stone with sandstone dressings and a slate roof. There are two storeys, a main range of three bays, a projecting two-bay range on the left, and a single-bay extension on the right. The doorways and windows have chamfered surrounds and pointed heads, the windows are sashes with Gothick tracery. On the front of the house is a single-storey porch with an embattled parapet.	II
