= Listed buildings in Ightenhill =

Ightenhill is a civil parish in the borough of Burnley, Lancashire, England. The parish contains 15 buildings that are recorded in the National Heritage List for England as designated listed buildings. Of these, two are listed at Grade I, the highest of the three grades, and the others are at Grade II, the lowest grade. The parish is partly rural, and partly residential as a district of the town of Burnley. The most notable buildings in the parish are Gawthorpe Hall and its Great Barn. These are both listed, as are structures associated with them. The other listed buildings include a farmhouse dating from the 16th century, a former schoolmaster's house, a parish church and its churchyard wall, a drinking fountain, and two boundary stones.

== Key ==
Grade	Criteria
I	Buildings of exceptional interest, sometimes considered to be internationally important
II	Buildings of national importance and special interest

== Buildings ==
Name and location	Photograph	Date	Notes	Grade
High Whitaker Farmhouse; 53.81231°N 2.30396°W		Early 16th century (probable)	The farmhouse originated as the wing of a manor house, and it was later extended to the west. It is in sandstone with a slate roof, the main block with two storeys, and the extension in a single storey. The windows are mullioned, including one in the south front with nine lights. There are two Tudor arched doorways, one with a porch.	II
Gawthorpe Hall; 53.80278°N 2.29474°W		1600–05	A country house, remodelled in 1849–52 by Charles Barry, and since 1972 owned by the National Trust. It is built in sandstone, it has a rectangular plan, and is in three storeys with a basement. The south front is symmetrical with five bays containing a central square porch, and canted bay windows in the outer bays, all rising through the three storeys. The doorway is flanked by Doric columns with obelisks on pedestals. On the sides are oriel windows, and within the body of the house is a tower. Surrounding the house is a 19th-century balustrade in Jacobean style that is included in the listing.	I
Great Barn, Gawthorpe Hall; 53.80243°N 2.29632°W		1602–04	A large sandstone barn with a stone-slate roof. It is 100 metres (328 ft) long with nine bays, it contains aisles, and there is a small lower extension at the southwest. The barn contains wagon entrances, mullioned windows, ventilation slits, and doorways. On the south gabled front, originally forming stables, are three arched openings.	I
Estate offices, Gawthorpe Hall; 53.80226°N 2.29561°W		1605–06	Originally farmhouses, stables and cottages, they have been converted for other uses including offices. They are in sandstone with stone-slate roofs, and have an L-shaped plan and two storeys, The buildings contain doorways, mullioned windows, and blocked ventilation slits.	II
Boundary stone 53.80479°N 2.29640°W	—	Early 19th century (probable)	The boundary stone is a round-headed slab about 0.5 metres (1.6 ft) high. It is inscribed with "Padiham".	II
Boundary stone 53.80549°N 2.29493°W	—	Early 19th century (probable)	The boundary stone is a round-headed slab about 0.5 metres (1.6 ft) high. It is inscribed with "Padiham" and "Habergm eaves".	II
487 Padiham Road; 53.79690°N 2.29275°W		1840	Originating as schoolmaster's house, it is in sandstone with a stone-slate roof, and is in Jacobean style. There are two storeys and three bays with a central Tudor arched doorway and a fanlight, above which is a datestone. In each storey are two two-light mullioned windows containing sashes.	II
All Saints Church; 53.79734°N 2.29112°W		1846–49	The church was designed by Weightman and Hadfield in Decorated style. It is built in sandstone with slate roofs, and consists of a nave, aisles, a south porch, north and south chapels, a chancel with a north vestry, and a west steeple. The steeple has a three-stage tower with buttresses, a west doorway, a large west window, and a broach spire with lucarnes.	II
Boundary wall and gateway, All Saints Church; 53.79701°N 2.29132°W		c. 1846–49	The sandstone wall extends completely round the rectangular churchyard of All Saints, and is about 150 metres (492 ft) long and 2 metres (6.6 ft) high. Towards the west end is a former drinking trough for horses, and opposite the steeple is a gateway with a steep segmental arch, a pitched parapet and a cross on the apex.	II
Habergham Lodge; 53.79743°N 2.28938°W		c. 1849–51 (probable)	The lodge at the southern entrance to Gawthorpe Hall was designed by Charles Barry in Jacobean style. It is in sandstone with a hipped slate roof, and has a rectangular plan and two storeys. There is a porch with a balustraded parapet and corner ball finials, and the windows are mullioned. At the top of the lodge is another balustraded parapet; this has an upstand containing a coat of arms. Attached to the lodge is a wall and gate piers that are included in the listing.	II
Game larder, Gawthorpe Hall; 53.80264°N 2.29516°W		Mid 19th century (probable)	The game larder is in sandstone with a stone-slate roof, and is a small rectangular single-storey building with a gable facing the path. It has large ventilation holes, and a plain doorway in the gable end. Within the building is an inner enclosure with a narrow passage between this and the external wall.	II
Gate piers and wall, Gawthorpe Hall; 53.80206°N 2.29639°W		19th century (probable)	The sandstone walls are about 3 metres (9.8 ft) high and surround the courtyard of the former home farm. The gate piers, about 4 metres (13.1 ft) high, are rusticated and have moulded caps and ball finials. About 2 metres (6.6 ft) to the west of these is a Tudor arched doorway.	II
Terrace wall, Gawthorpe Hall; 53.80308°N 2.29505°W		c. 1850–52	The gardens were laid out by Charles Barry and included the semicircular terrace wall around the north formal garden. It is in sandstone, and the ends are turned in to form ornamental benches. On the parapet are Jacobean-style finials.	II
Drinking fountain 53.79734°N 2.28908°W		1859	The drinking fountain is set into a wall to the east of Habergham Lodge. It is in polished pink granite, about 0.5 metres (1.6 ft) high, and consists of a semicircular bowl with a rectangular back plate that contains a tap and has an inscription.	II
Coach house, Gawthorpe Hall; 53.80238°N 2.29603°W		1870	The coach house is in stone with a hipped slate roof, and is in Gothic style. It is a rectangular two-bay building with a single tall storey. On the front are two large carriage openings between which is a medallion in a diamond-shaped recess. The right corner is buttresses.	II
