= Listed buildings in Wiswell =

Wiswell is a civil parish in Ribble Valley, Lancashire, England. It contains seven listed buildings that are recorded in the National Heritage List for England. Of these, one is listed at Grade I, the highest of the three grades, and the others are at Grade II, the lowest grade. The parish contains the small village of Wiswell, and is otherwise rural. The listed buildings consist of houses, farmhouses, a barn, and a medieval wayside cross.

== Key ==
| Grade | Criteria |
|---|---|
| I | Buildings of exceptional interest, sometimes considered to be internationally important |
| II | Buildings of national importance and special interest |

== Buildings ==
| Name and location | Photograph | Date | Notes | Grade |
|---|---|---|---|---|
| Wiswell Shay Cross; 53.83103°N 2.39139°W | | Medieval | The cross is in sandstone. The oldest part is the base, the shaft and head dating from a 19th-century restoration. The base has a rectangular plan, chamfered edges, and a rectangular socket. | II |
| Vicarage House; 53.83182°N 2.38888°W | | Early 17th century | A sandstone house with a stone-slate roof in two storeys. The windows are mullioned, or mullioned and transomed, and have chamfered surrounds and hoods. The doorway has a chamfered surround and a Tudor arched head. The gables are coped and have ball finials. Inside the house are bressumers and inglenooks, and much timber panelling. | I |
| Crabtree Cottage; 53.83389°N 2.38736°W | — | Late 17th century | A pebbledashed stone house with a slate roof, in two storeys and four bays, the fourth bay having been converted from a stable. The windows are mullioned with chamfered surrounds, and some of the mullions have been removed. The doorways have rendered surrounds. | II |
| Barn near Vicarage House; 53.83213°N 2.38903°W | | c. 1700 | The building is in stone and has a roof partly of Welsh slate, and partly of stone slabs. It is in three units, comprising a store, a barn, and a byre, and each unit has an entrance, the entrance to the barn being a wagon entry. The building contains massive quoins. (Note: Street View in May 2011 shows that the building has been converted for residential use.) | II |
| Wiswell Eaves House; 53.83686°N 2.37605°W | — | c. 1700 | The house was altered in 1766, and is in sandstone with a slate roof. It has two storeys with an attic and two bays. The windows on the front are sashes. Between the bays is a single-storey gabled porch containing a doorway with a moulded surround and a round head. There is an inscribed plaque between the first floor windows. | II |
| Parker Place Farmhouse; 53.83769°N 2.37511°W | — | Mid 18th century | A sandstone house with a stone-slate roof, in two storeys with attics, and with a two-bay front. The windows are mullioned with three lights, the central lights containing a sash window. In the centre is a blocked doorway with a chamfered lintel. | II |
| Wiswell School War Memorial; 53.83251°N 2.38764°W | | 1925 | The war memorial is built into the east wall of the old school. It is in local sandstone and consists of a tablet set into the wall, with a plinth below. The tablet contains an inscription and the names of those lost in the First World War, with one additional name for the Second World War. At the top of the tablet is a carved wheel-head cross, and over it is a hood mould. The plinth contains a trough for planting. | II |

== Notes and references ==
=== Sources ===
- Hartwell, Clare; Pevsner, Nikolaus (2009) [1969], Lancashire: North, The Buildings of England, New Haven and London: Yale University Press, ISBN 978-0-300-12667-9
- Historic England, "Wiswell Shay Cross (1362372)", National Heritage List for England
- Historic England, "Vicarage House, Wiswell (1362371)", National Heritage List for England
- Historic England, "Crabtree Cottage, Wiswell (1072048)", National Heritage List for England
- Historic England, "Barn approximately 50 metres northwest of Vicarage House, Wiswell (1067538)", National Heritage List for England
- Historic England, "Wiswell Eaves House, Wiswell (1317630)", National Heritage List for England
- Historic England, "Parker Place Farmhouse, Wiswell (1164774)", National Heritage List for England
- Historic England, "Wiswell School War Memorial, Wiswell (1444638)", National Heritage List for England
- Historic England, Listed Buildings
