= The Old Zoo =

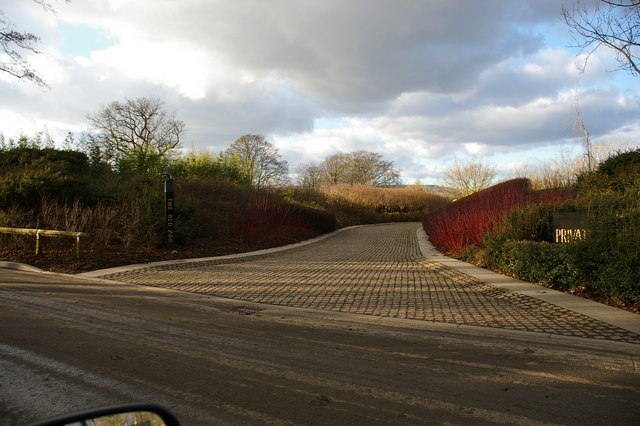
- The entrance to The Old Zoo

- Location within the Borough of Ribble Valley

General information
- Type: Country house
- Location: Brockhall Village, Lancashire, England
- Coordinates: 53.8280°N 2.4546°W
- Completed: 2000

Design and construction
- Architects: Homa and Sima Farjadi

The Old Zoo is a modern country house in Brockhall Village, Lancashire, England, 6 miles (10 km) south-west of Clitheroe.

It was finished in 2000 on the site of the old petting zoo of Brockhall Hospital. It was designed through a competition held by RIBA. The house was commissioned by property tycoon Gerald Hitman in 1997, and the winning design chosen out of over 120 entries was by Homa and Sima Farjadi. The New York Museum of Modern Art named The Old Zoo as one of 26 examples of the finest present-day house design worldwide in 1999. It has 15 acres (61,000 m^{2}) of gardens.

It was featured on the BBC Four programme Living with the Future. John Tempest, former RIBA vice president, called it "the best contemporary house built in England since the 1930s" and Giles Worsley, former architecture editor of the Daily Telegraph called it "the most radical house in England".
