= Great Barn, Ightenhill =

Building in Lancashire, England

Great Barn
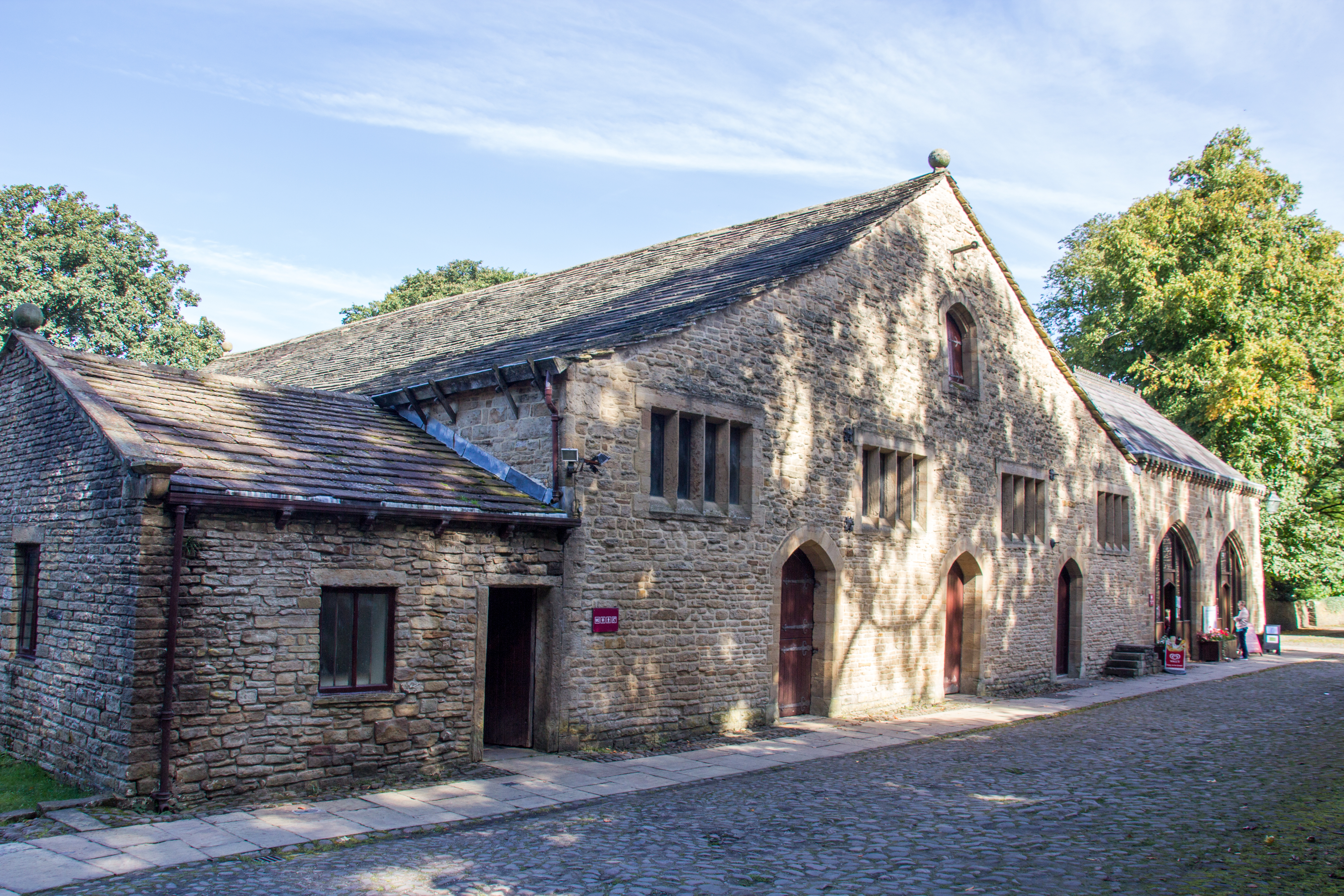
- The building pictured in 2016
- Interactive map of the Great Barn area

General information
- Location: Ightenhill, Lancashire, England
- Coordinates: 53.8024°N 2.296343°W
- Completed: c. 1605 (421 years ago)

Listed Building – Grade I
- Designated: 1 April 1953
- Reference no.: 1237628

Great Barn is an historic building in the English civil parish of Ightenhill, Lancashire. Built around 1605 about 100 metres (330 ft) west of Gawthorpe Hall, it is now a Grade I listed building.

== See also ==
- Grade I listed buildings in Lancashire
- Listed buildings in Ightenhill
