= St Oswald's Church, Warton =

Coordinates: 54.1442°N 2.7694°W

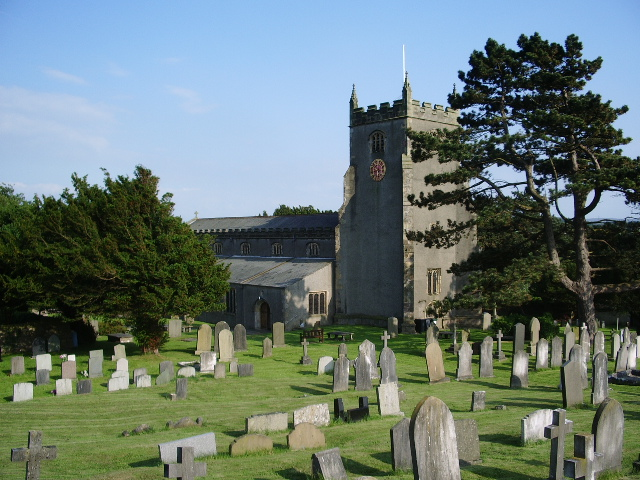
- St Oswald's Church, Warton, from the northwest

- Location within the City of Lancaster district
- OS grid reference: SD 49829 72316
- Location: Main Street, Warton, Lancashire
- Country: England
- Denomination: Anglican
- Website: ubwby.org/warton/

History
- Status: Parish church
- Dedication: Saint Oswald

Architecture
- Functional status: Active
- Heritage designation: Grade II
- Designated: 2 May 1968
- Architect(s): Sharpe and Paley; Paley, Austin and Paley
- Architectural type: Church
- Style: Gothic, Gothic Revival
- Completed: 1892

Specifications
- Materials: Pebbledash with sandstone dressings, slate roof

Administration
- Province: York
- Diocese: Blackburn
- Archdeaconry: Lancaster
- Deanery: Tunstall
- Benefice: United Benefice of Warton and Borwick with Yealand
- Parish: St Oswald, Warton

Clergy
- Vicar: Vacant

St Oswald's Church is in the village of Warton, Lancashire, England. It is an active Anglican parish church in the deanery of Tunstall, the archdeaconry of Lancaster, and the diocese of Blackburn. Its benefice is united with those of St Mary, Borwick and St John the Evangelist, Yealand Conyers. The church is recorded in the National Heritage List for England as a designated Grade II listed building. The ruined remains of the medieval rectory survive next to the present vicarage to the west of the church.

== History ==
The present church is probably built on the site of a church in existence prior to the 12th century. It was largely rebuilt in the 15th century, retaining part of the wall of the south aisle. The north aisle was either added or rebuilt in the 16th century. In 1848–49 renovation work was carried out on the south arcade by the Lancaster architects Sharpe and Paley. More extensive restoration work was carried out in 1892 by Paley, Austin and Paley, successors to Sharpe and Paley. This consisted of renewing windows in the clerestory, the north aisle and elsewhere, and reconstructing the roof. The church has historical connections with the Washington family, ancestors of George Washington, first president of the United States. Since 1977, a Flag of Washington, D.C. has been in the church; it was given by American soldiers and normally hangs in the church, except on the Fourth of July, when it is flown from a flagpole outside.

== Architecture ==
=== Exterior ===
The church is pebbledashed with sandstone dressings, and has a slate roof. Its plan consists of a west tower, a nave with north and south aisles and a clerestory, and a chancel. The tower has angle buttresses, three-light bell openings, and a battlemented parapet with corner pinnacles. The former west door has been partly blocked, making it into a window, and over this is a small niche. The tower is 62 feet (19 m) high.

=== Interior ===
The tower once bore the arms of the Washington family, but these have been moved and are now re-set inside it. The tower holds three bells, hung for full circle ringing, but currently unfit to be rung. The second bell dates from 1571, the tenor from 1731, and the treble from 1782. The second and the frame in which the bells are hung are considered to be of historical significance. In the southeast chapel is a sedilia that is considered to date from the late 13th or early 14th century. The font is cylindrical and lead-lined, and carries the date 1661. Incorporated into the 19th-century pews are coats of arms, one of these being of the Washington family that is dated 1614. In the southwest aisle are the arms of Queen Victoria. In the church is stained glass by Shrigley and Hunt, Ward and Hughes, and F. Burrow, and memorial wall tablets by George Webster. There is more stained glass in the vestry by Shrigley and Hunt; this depicts Saints Oswald, Patrick and Aidan.

== External features ==
The churchyard contains the war graves of eight service personnel of World War I, and a Royal Artillery soldier of World War II.

== See also ==
- Listed buildings in Warton, Lancaster
- List of works by Sharpe and Paley
- List of works by Paley, Austin and Paley
