= Vicarage House, Wiswell =

Grade I listed house in Lancashire, United Kingdom

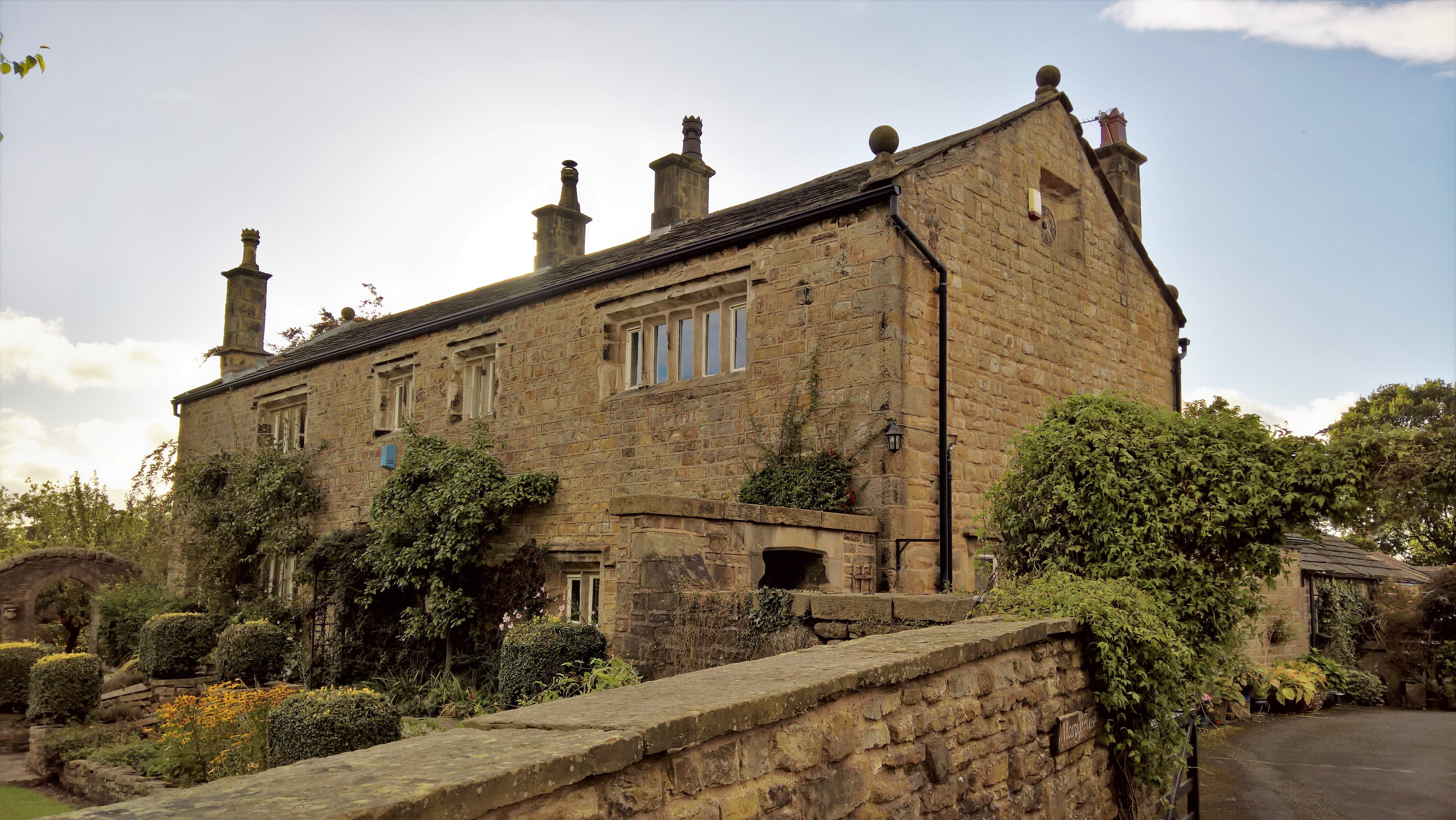
- "the most interesting building" in Wiswell

- Location within Lancashire
- 53.8318°N 2.3889°W
- Type: House
- Location: Wiswell, Lancashire

History
- Built: 17th century

Site notes
- Architectural style: Vernacular
- Owner: Private

Listed Building – Grade I
- Official name: Vicarage House
- Designated: 13 February 1967
- Reference no.: 1362371

Listed Building – Grade II
- Official name: Barn 50m north-west of Vicarage House
- Designated: 20 February 1991
- Reference no.: 1067538

Vicarage House stands on Vicarage Fold at the southern edge of the village of Wiswell, Lancashire, England. It dates from the early 17th century and has been described as "the most interesting building" in the village. It is a Grade I listed building, while an associated barn is listed at Grade II.

== History and description ==
The Victoria County History for Lancashire records that, in the 13th century, the manor of Wiswell was held by William de Arches from the lords of Clitheroe.

Clare Hartwell, in her Lancashire: North volume in the Buildings of England series, revised and reissued in 2009, describes Vicarage House as "the most interesting building" in the village. Historic England's listing record notes that the building material is sandstone rubble under a slate roof. The interior contains extensive wood work of 17th-century date. (Note: Historic England notes that some of the wood panelling has been rearranged and may not be original to the house.) Vicarage House is a Grade I listed building. An associated barn is also 17th century in date and is listed at Grade II.

The house remains a private residence and is not accessible to the public.

== See also ==
- Grade I listed buildings in Lancashire
- Listed buildings in Wiswell

== Sources ==
- Farrer, William; Brownbill, J. (1911). A History of the County of Lancaster. Victoria County History. Vol. 6. London: Victoria County History. OCLC 461209455.
- Hartwell, Clare; Pevsner, Nikolaus (2009). Lancashire: North. The Buildings of England. New Haven, US and London: Yale University Press. ISBN 978-0-300-12667-9. OCLC 262432356.
