= Great Barn, Hoghton =

Building in Lancashire, England

Great Barn
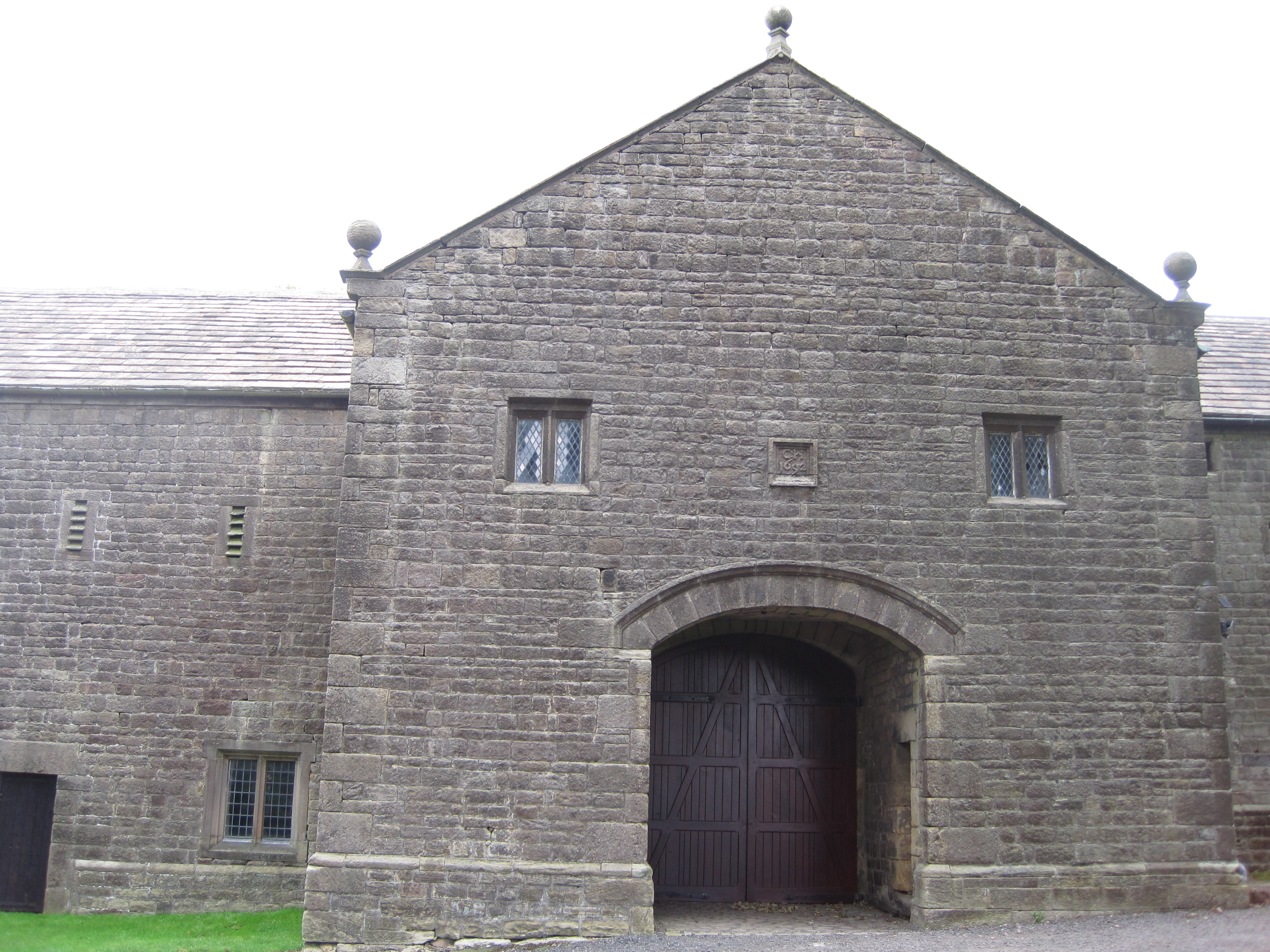
- The building in 2013
- Interactive map of the Great Barn area

General information
- Location: Hoghton, Lancashire, England
- Coordinates: 53.732995°N 2.575301°W
- Completed: 1692 (334 years ago)

Listed Building – Grade I
- Designated: 22 October 1952
- Reference no.: 1164490

Great Barn is an historic building in the English village of Hoghton, Lancashire. Built in 1692, and constructed using the local sandstone grit, it is now a Grade I listed building. It stands just west of Hoghton Tower.

The building is eleven bays long. One end was lofted when it was used as a milking parlour and the walls at the other end were reinforced with railway sleepers for its last agricultural use as a silage clamp.

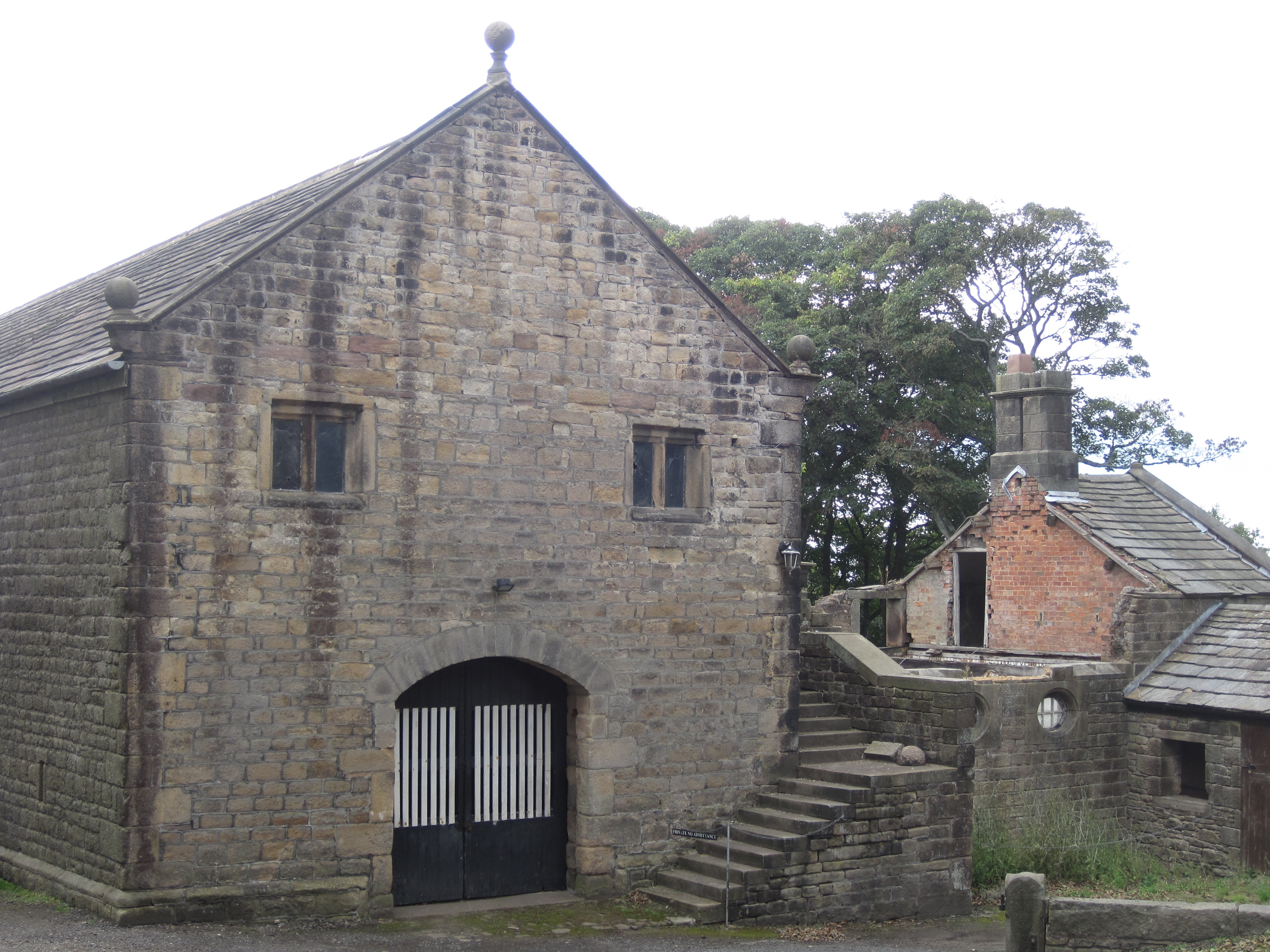
2013 view

== Wedding Venue ==
In 2021, planning permission was approved by Chorley Borough Council to convert the 17th century barn into a wedding venue. The planning application included repairs to the structure and conversion of nearby buildings into other uses such as shops.

Historic England supported the application, saying that it will secure the long-term future of the buildings.

== See also ==
- Grade I listed buildings in Lancashire
- Listed buildings in Hoghton
