= St Augustine's Roman Catholic High School, Billington =

Coordinates: 53.816°N 2.427°W

St Augustine's RC High School
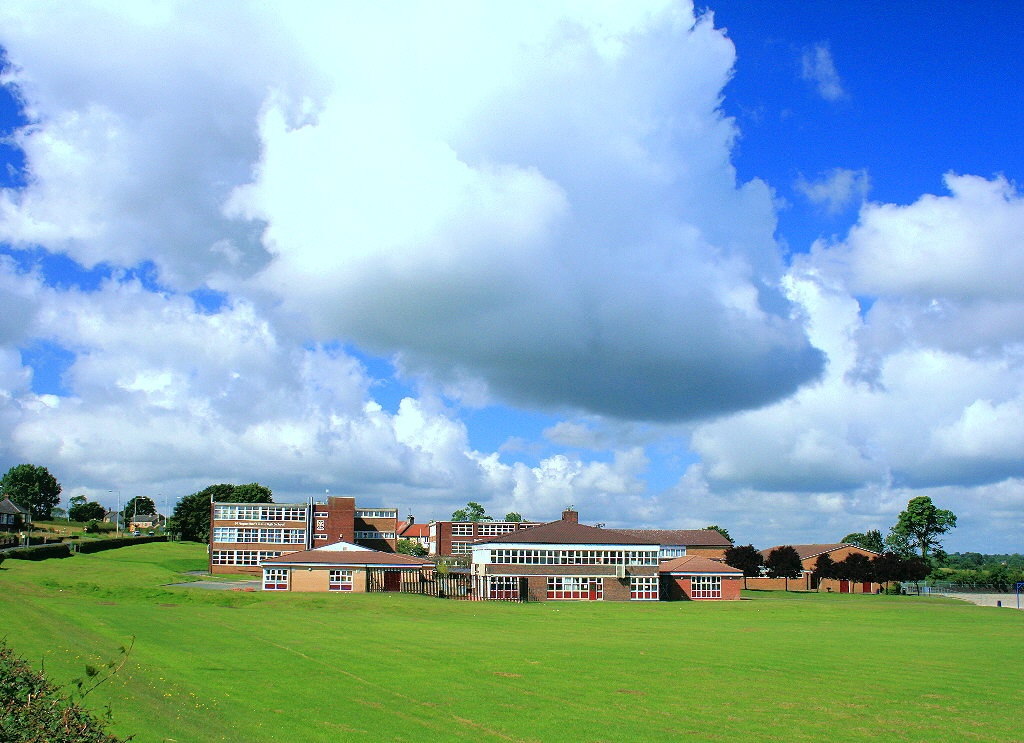

Location
- Elker Lane; Billington, Lancashire; England

Information
- Type: Academy
- Motto: Fidei Heredes (Inheritors of the faith)
- Religious affiliation: Roman Catholic
- Established: 1963; 63 years ago
- Local authority: Lancashire
- Trust: Romero Catholic Academy Trust
- Department for Education URN: 149457 Tables
- Ofsted: Reports
- Headteacher: Claire Hunt
- Gender: Coeducational
- Age: 11 to 16
- Enrolment: 1062
- Houses: Arrowsmith, Barlow, Clitherow, Fisher, Line, More, Owen, Southworth, Ward.
- Colour: Maroon Blue
- Website: www.sarchs.com

St Augustine's RC High School is a coeducational Roman Catholic secondary school located in Billington, Lancashire, England.

== History ==
The school opened in 1963 originally intaking 450 pupils. It is now the largest Roman Catholic high school in its LEA.

St Augustine's won the DfES School Achievement Award for both 2000–2001 and 2001–2002. It was the only high school in Lancashire to be awarded Beacon status in 2002. In 2003, it became one of the first Leading Edge Schools in England and one of Lancashire’s first three Specialist Science Colleges. In 2008, it achieved High Performing Specialist College status and was also awarded Specialist Languages College status.

Previously a voluntary aided school administered by Lancashire County Council, in December 2022 St Augustine's converted to academy status. The school is now sponsored by the Romero Catholic Academy Trust, but continues to be under the jurisdiction of the Roman Catholic Diocese of Salford.

== Curriculum ==
=== Curriculum at KS3 ===
| Subject | Allocated time |
|---|---|
| RE | 8% |
| English | 12% |
| Mathematics | 12% |
| Science | 12% |
| History | 8% |
| RMFL | 10% |
| PE/games | 8% |
| Art | 4% |
| ICT | 4% |
| Geography | 8% |
| Music | 4% |
| Design technology | 6% |
| Drama | 2% |
| PSHE | 2% |

=== Curriculum at KS4 ===
Every student must take maths, English and Religious Education, along with either Double Award Science, or separate sciences. These are allocated 3 slots per week. Although St Augustines is a specialist language college, learning a language is not obligatory. Pupils must select more courses in order to fill the timetable. Each non-core subject takes up 2 periods per week on the timetable.

== Lessons ==
There are many different subjects taught at St Augustine's. In year 9, options are taken for pupils to choose their own subjects. All subjects are taken in years 7-9.

- English - split into English language and English literature in year 10.
- Mathematics
- Science - in year 9 pupils can opt for 'triple science' (biology, chemistry and physics) or 'science' (a grouping of all three)
- Modern foreign languages - split into French and Spanish.
- Art
- Electronics
- Food technology
- Graphic design
- Music
- Information computer technology (ICT)
- History
- Geography
- Drama
- Religious education
- Physical education
- PHSE

== Attainment ==
| Year | 5 A* - C |
|---|---|
| 2004 | 80% |
| 2005 | 85% |
| 2006 | 86% |
| 2007 | 87% |
| 2008 | 89% |
| 2009 | 90% |

== Notable former pupils ==
- David Dunn, footballer
- Michael Bisping, professional mixed martial artist
- Gareth Ainsworth, former professional footballer and Shrewsbury manager
