= Hoghton Tower =

Grade I listed historic house museum in Lancashire, England

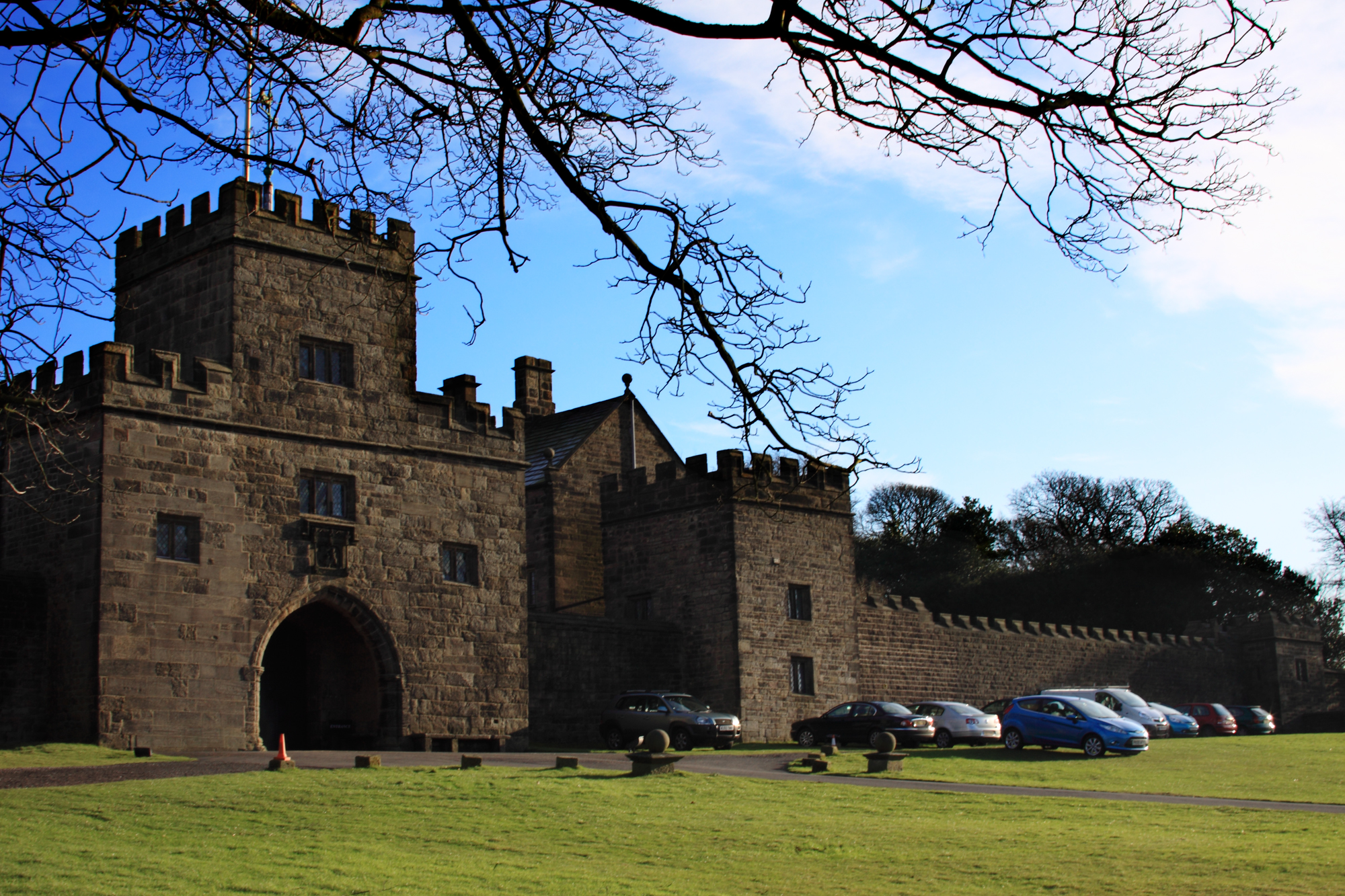
- Hoghton Tower in 2012
- Interactive map of Hoghton Tower
- 53.7329°N 2.5735°W
- Location: Hoghton, Lancashire, England
- OS grid reference: SD 623,264

History
- Built: c, 1560–65
- Built for: Thomas de Hoghton

Site notes
- Elevation: 560 ft (170 m)
- Architect(s): Paley and Austin, James Bertwistle, Robert Dudley Oliver
- Restored: 1862–1902
- Restored by: Sir Henry de Hoghton; Sir Charles de Hoghton

Listed Building – Grade I
- Designated: 22 October 1952
- Reference no.: 1072532

Hoghton Tower is a fortified manor house two-thirds of a mile (1 km) east of the village of Hoghton, Lancashire, England, and stands on a hilltop site on the highest point in the area. It takes its name from the de Hoghton family, its historical owners since at least the 12th century. The present house dates from about 1560–65.

It was damaged during the Civil War and subsequently became derelict, but was rebuilt and extended between 1862 and 1901. The house is listed at Grade I, as is the Great Barn in its grounds, which is dated 1692. Also in the grounds are two structures listed at Grade II. The house and garden are open to the public at advertised times, and are administered by the charitable Hoghton Tower Preservation Trust.

== History ==
The property is on a hill at the southwesterly end of the Pendle range. The estate has been owned by the Hoghton family since at least the 12th century. The present building dates from about 1560–65, and was built for Thomas de Hoghton (1518–1580), as a replacement for an earlier house. Connections with William Shakespeare through Alexander Hoghton who died in 1581 have been suggested, although this is disputed.

King James I visited Hoghton between 15 and 18 August 1617, accompanied by a substantial retinue, and was joined by many of the leading local families. The visit is the subject of a later painting by the Victorian artist George Cattermole. On 16 August, he visited the alum mines belonging to Sir Richard Hoghton and while out hunting, shot at a stag and missed.

At the time of the king's visit, a local dispute was ongoing in Lancashire between the Puritans and the gentry, many of whom were Roman Catholics, as to what activities should be permissible on Sundays and other holy days. In response to a petition delivered at Myerscough, the king spoke about "liberty to pipeing and honest recreation". After further representations, James asked Bishop Morton to draft a response, which established a local convention, a forerunner of the Declaration of Sports. This was subsequently published, with national application, as the Declaration of Sports, which defined, and generally eased, restrictions on sports and recreations that could be undertaken.

A menu for the feasts on 17 and 18 August 1617, with the names of the cooks and kitchen workers, survives. This is the origin of the erroneous claim that the term sirloin steak derives from James being so impressed by his loin of beef that he knighted it "Sir Loin". There is no reliable evidence for this explanation and scholars generally hold it to be a myth. A pub in the nearby village was named after the supposed event.

In 1643 the house was damaged by Parliamentary forces during the Civil War. In February 1643, after the taking of Preston by Sir John Seaton, Hoghton Tower was besieged by Parliamentary troops under Captain Nicholas Starkie of Huntroyd. At the time the house held a garrison of only 30-40 musketeers who capitulated on 14 February. When the Roundheads entered the house, the powder magazine in the old pele tower, between the two courtyards, exploded, killing over 100 Parliamentary men. This central tower was never rebuilt.

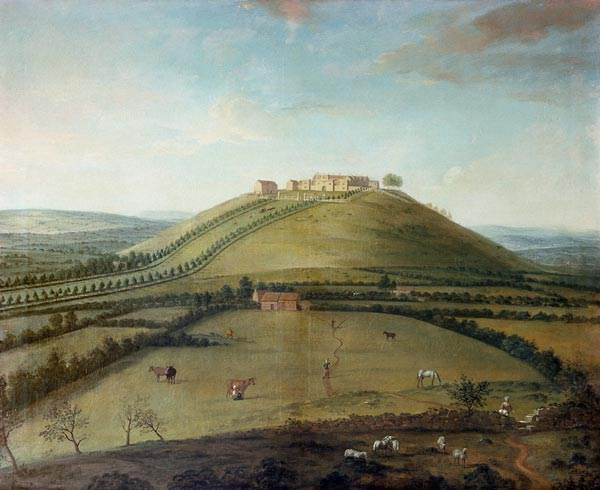
Hoghton Tower by Arthur Devis, 1735

From 1662, for over a hundred years, Hoghton Tower housed nonconformist services in the Banqueting Hall, after Sir Gilbert's son Sir Richard (1616–1678) converted to Presbyterianism and by 1664 it had become a centre, in the Blackburn District, for both Independents and Presbyterians. John and Charles Wesley are reputed to have preached at Hoghton.

In 1692–1702 Sir Charles de Hoghton carried out repairs and rebuilding. Wiliam III was a frequent visitor to the house, being a personal friend of Sir Charles. He was succeeded by the fifth baronet, Sir Henry, who in 1735 commissioned a topographical view of the house, "Hoghton Tower from Duxon Hill", from Arthur Devis. To the left of a panorama over the home fields, a coach is seen approaching the gateway up the broad avenue.

In 1768 the family permanently moved to another property and Hoghton was let; by the middle of the 19th century it was derelict. Sir Henry de Hoghton, the 9th Baronet, inherited the estate in 1862 and decided to restore the house. Charles Dickens visited in 1867 and, although the house was dilapidated, he was inspired to write his 1868 short story George Silverman's Explanation, in which the Hoghton features prominently.

The first architects engaged by Sir Henry are not recorded but by 1876 the Lancaster architects Paley and Austin were involved, having carried out work on rooms including the banqueting hall. Sir Henry died the same year, and restoration work was continued by his brother, Charles, the 10th Baronet, although the house was not ready for him to take up residence until 1880. By that time Paley and Austin had restored the gateway tower and the adjacent walls (1877), designed an entrance lodge (1878), carried out work on the offices in the east wing, built a new kitchen, a new underground service corridor, and made other alterations (1879–80). A view of the restored gateway by local artist James 'Clock' Shaw (1836–1915) was painted at this time and is in Bury Art Museum. Further work on the stables and farm buildings was carried out by the Blackburn-based architect James Bertwistle. Sir Charles died in 1893, and from 1896 to 1901 the London architect Robert Dudley Oliver added nursery accommodation, a smoking room, a billiards room and a large drawing room (later used as the ballroom).

== Architecture ==
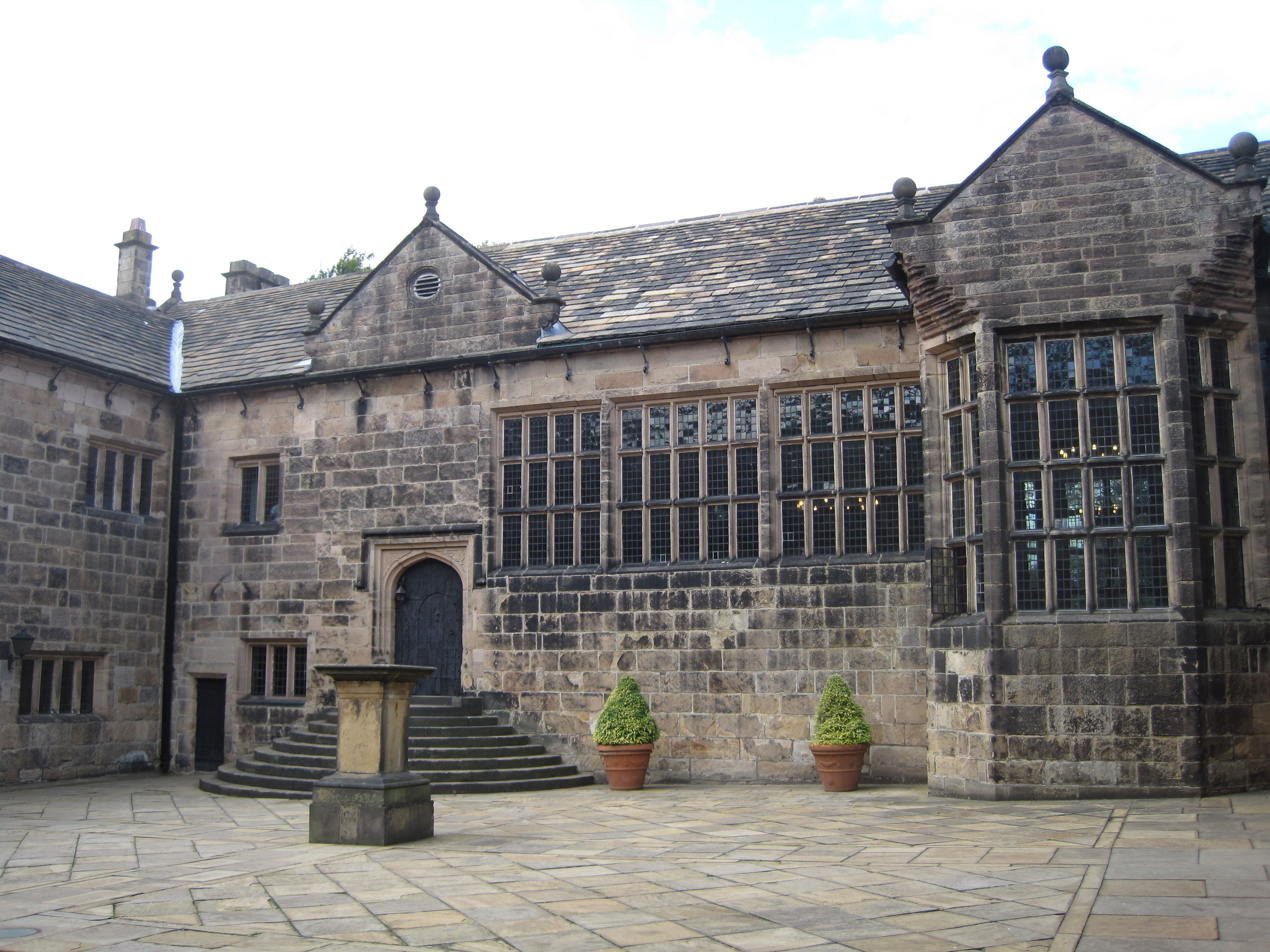
Inner courtyard

Hoghton Tower is constructed in sandstone, with stone slate roofs. It has a double courtyard plan, the outer courtyard being entered on the west side through a large gatehouse. The gatehouse is embattled and in two storeys, with a central tower rising by more than one additional storey. Above its archway is a 16th-century cartouche containing a carving of Samson and the Lion. On each side of the gateway, embattled walls lead to square corner pavilions, which are also embattled. Buildings of differing dates stand on the north and south sides of the outer courtyard. This is in two levels, the eastern part being higher than the western. Between the two levels is a wall, and steps leading up to a gateway with 18th-century wrought iron gates between gate piers. In the northeast corner of the courtyard is a 17th-century well house, which stands on the traditional site of the original tower that was destroyed in the Civil War. The inner courtyard has a west gateway, a great hall and kitchen on the north side, state rooms on the east, and living rooms on the south and west sides; it is mainly in two storeys. At the north east corner is a porch (this was formerly the site of a chapel). Bay windows project from the north and south sides of the great hall.

== Interior ==
The house has a Tudor well house, with a well 120 feet (37 m) deep and a horse-drawn pump and winding gear. The State Bed in the State Bedroom was made at Samlesbury in the mid-16th century. The ballroom was decorated by Gillows of Lancaster in the 19th century. The banqueting hall has 4,000 Flemish stained glass panes. The house is known to contain three priest holes.

== Gardens and grounds ==
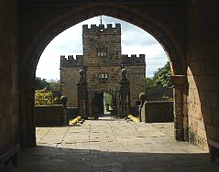
Gateway seen through the entrance to the inner courtyard

The house is approached by a long straight drive leading eastwards from the A675 road. It passes through a pair of gate piers about 200 yards (183 m) west of the house. Between these gates and the entrance to the outer courtyard is a grassed area known as the Tilting Ground, which is enclosed by a wall on the south side and the Great Barn to the north. On the east side of the house is a walled garden, known as the Wilderness, and on the south side are smaller walled gardens, the Rose Garden and the Rampart Garden. The Great Barn is constructed in sandstone with a slate roof, and incorporates a cart house. It is dated 1692, and has ball finials on its gables. To the northwest of the house are the coach house and stables, also in sandstone, and dating from the 17th or early 18th century. A small cupola was added to it in the 19th century. At the entry to the drive on the main road is Paley and Austin's lodge of 1878.

== Present day ==
Hoghton Tower and the Great Barn were designated as a Grade I listed buildings on 22 October 1952. Listed at Grade II are the coach house and stables, and the gate piers on the drive to the west of the house. The gardens are listed at Grade II on the National Register of Historic Parks and Gardens.

In 1978 the Hoghton Tower Preservation Trust was established as a charity for the preservation of the house, and to encourage education and research. It raises income by "charging an admission fee to visitors, running events, providing holiday accommodation and being rented out as a venue for weddings, filming, corporate entertainment and private functions". The house and gardens are open to the general public at advertised times. Inside the house is a collection of dolls' houses. There is a tea room, and a gift shop. Residential accommodation is available in a converted former garrison.

The house has been used as a film location on a number of occasions. Parts of the second series of Last Tango in Halifax (2012) were filmed here and the 2005 drama Casanova starring David Tennant was partly filmed at the house.

In 2015, the house and estate were run by a team headed by Elena Faraoni, daughter of the 14th baronet.

== See also ==
- Grade I listed buildings in Lancashire
- Listed buildings in Hoghton
- List of non-ecclesiastical works by Paley and Austin

== Sources ==
- Singleton, Frank (1950). Hoghton Tower. Preston: W S Heane Ltd.
- Farrer, William; Brownbill, J., eds. (1911). A History of the County of Lancaster: Volume 6. London: Victoria County History.
