= Billington, Lancashire =

Village in Lancashire, England

Coordinates: 53.816°N 2.422°W

Billington
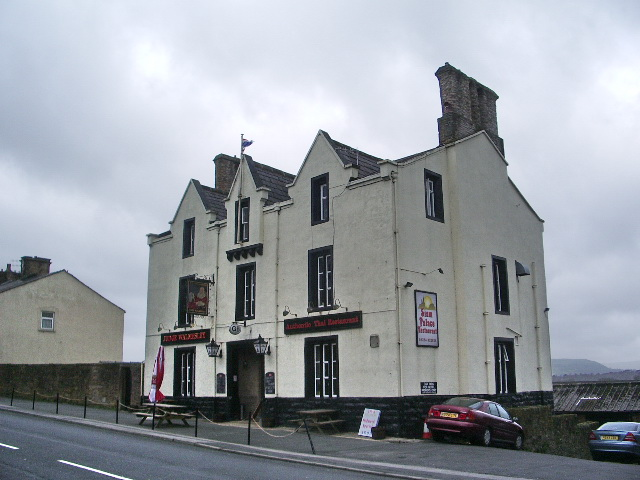
- The Judge Walmesley public house, Billington

- Shown within Ribble Valley Location within Lancashire
- OS grid reference: SD722356
- Civil parish: Billington and Langho
- District: Ribble Valley
- Shire county: Lancashire
- Region: North West
- Country: England
- Sovereign state: United Kingdom
- Post town: CLITHEROE
- Postcode district: BB7
- Dialling code: 01254
- Police: Lancashire
- Fire: Lancashire
- Ambulance: North West
- UK Parliament: Ribble Valley

Billington is a village in the Ribble Valley district of Lancashire, England. It lies between the villages of Whalley and Langho. It forms part of the Billington and Langho civil parish and contains the schools St Augustine's RC High School, St Leonard's Primary and St Mary's Primary. The village population at the 2011 census was 1,409.

The 16th century Chapel of St Leonard is a Grade I listed building. According to local tradition, the chapel was constructed using materials taken from Whalley Abbey following the dissolution of the monasteries in the Tudor period, but this has never been conclusively proven.

== History ==
In 798, early in his reign, Eardwulf of Northumbria fought a battle at Billington Moor against a nobleman named Wada, who had been one of those who killed Æthelred I of Northumbria. Wada was defeated and driven into exile.

A charter written in 1308 mentions a hermitage by the rocks on the eastern side of Billington.

The village has been known previously as Billindon (1203), Billinton (1208), Bilingdon (1241), Belyngton or Bilyngton (14th–16th centuries).

In the 16th century, tenants of the village shared common land known as Billington Common with tenants of local villages Great Harwood and Wilpshire. There also existed a wood of approximately 60 acres named Elker, which contained oak trees, as well as hazel and alder. Oak and ash trees could also be found in the smaller Nab wood, which was around 40 acres.

The Judge Walmsley public house was built in 1749 along the main road close by Whalley bridge. It was formerly situated in the nearby hamlet of Chew. It operated as a coaching inn and contained a barn and stables for horses. It ceased operating as a public house in c2018 ending a long legacy and association in the village.

St Augustine’s Roman Catholic high school opened in 1963.

== See also ==
- Listed buildings in Billington and Langho
