= St Oswald's Vicarage, Warton =

Former clergy house in Lancashire, England

St Oswald's Vicarage
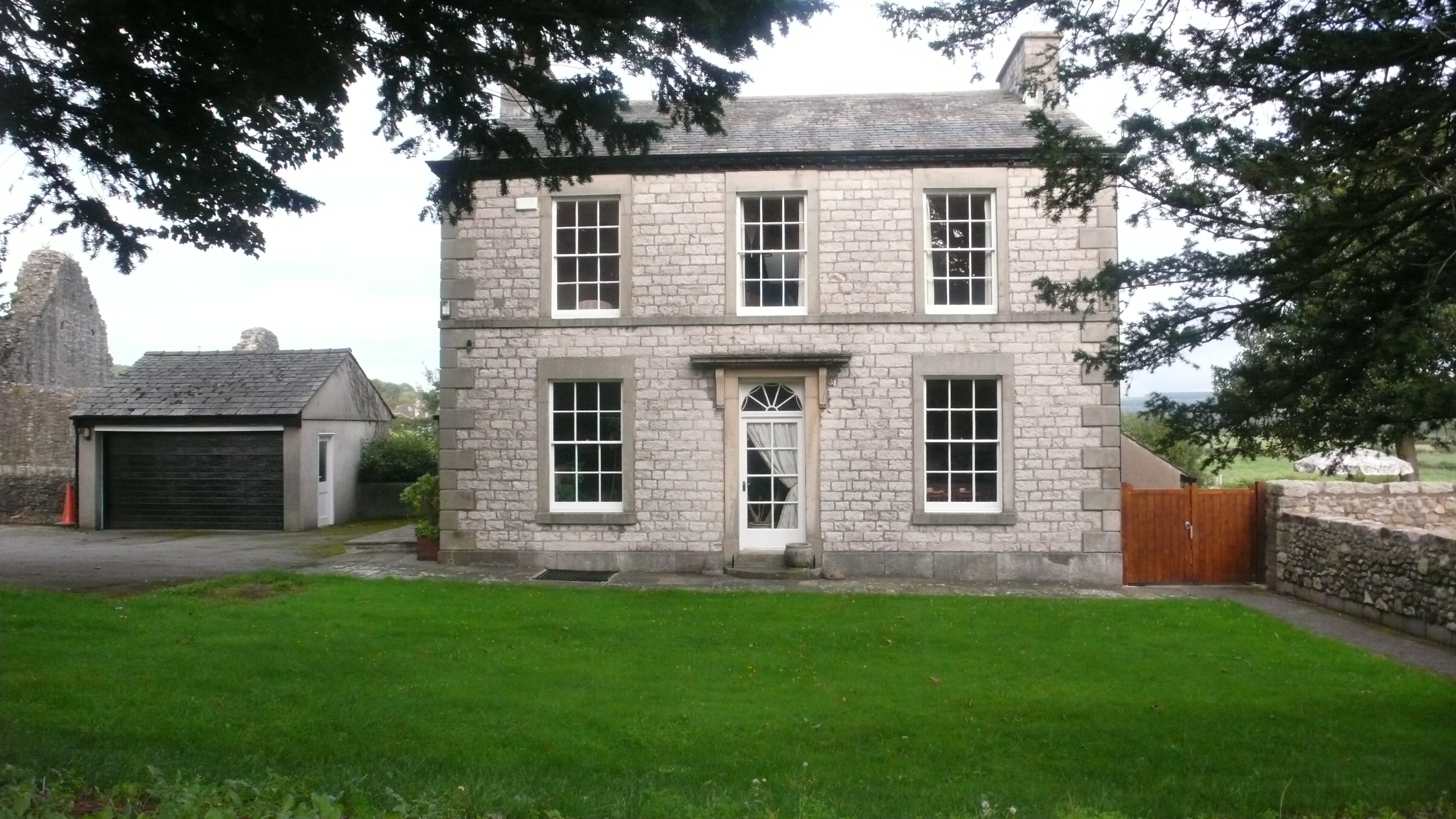
- The building in 2013
- Interactive map of the St Oswald's Vicarage area

General information
- Location: Warton, Lancashire, England
- Coordinates: 54.144102°N 2.768378°W
- Completed: 1823 (203 years ago)

Technical details
- Floor count: 2

Listed Building – Grade I
- Designated: 2 May 1968
- Reference no.: 1308862

St Oswald's Vicarage is a historic building in the English village of Warton, Lancashire. Largely built in 1823 (although its rear wing dates to around 1300), it was formerly the clergy house for the nearby St Oswald's Church. It is now a Grade I listed building. It is constructed in coursed limestone. A post-war extension of the property is not of special interest.

== See also ==
- Grade I listed buildings in Lancashire
