= De Hoghton baronets =

Title in the Baronetage of England

- Escutcheon of de Hoghton Baronets of Hoghton Tower
- Creation date: 1611
- Status: extant
- Motto: Malgré le tort, In spite of wrong

The Hoghton or Houghton, later Bold-Hoghton, later de Hoghton Baronetcy, of Hoghton Tower in the County of Lancashire, is a title in the Baronetage of England. It was created on 22 May 1611 for Richard Hoghton, Member of Parliament for Lancashire. The Hoghton family had been landowners in Lancashire since the reign of King Stephen and had been Knights of the Shire for Lancashire since the 14th century. The second Baronet represented Clitheroe and Lancashire in the House of Commons and was a Royalist leader during the Civil War. The third and fourth Baronets both sat as Members of Parliament for Lancashire. The fifth Baronet was Member of Parliament for Preston and East Looe while the sixth and seventh Baronets represented Preston. The eighth Baronet assumed the additional surname of Bold. In 1892 the ninth Baronet resumed, by Royal licence, the ancient family surname of de Hoghton.

== Hoghton, later Bold-Hoghton, later de Hoghton baronets, of Hoghton Tower (1611) ==
- Sir Richard Hoghton, 1st Baronet (1570–1630)
- Sir Gilbert Hoghton, 2nd Baronet (1591–1647)
- Sir Richard Hoghton, 3rd Baronet (c. 1616–1678)
- Sir Charles Hoghton, 4th Baronet (c. 1644–1710)
- Sir Henry Hoghton, 5th Baronet (c. 1678–1768)
- Sir Henry Hoghton, 6th Baronet (1728–1795)
- Sir Henry Philip Hoghton, 7th Baronet (1768–1835)
- Sir Henry Bold-Hoghton, 8th Baronet (1799–1862)
- Sir Henry de Hoghton, 9th Baronet (1821–1876)
- Sir Charles de Hoghton, 10th Baronet (1823–1893)
- Sir James de Hoghton, 11th Baronet (1851–1938)
- Sir Cuthbert de Hoghton, 12th Baronet (1880–1958)
- Sir (Henry Philip) Anthony Mary de Hoghton, 13th Baronet (1919–1978)
- Sir (Richard) Bernard Cuthbert de Hoghton, 14th Baronet (born 1945)

The sole heir to the title is the present baronet's son, Thomas James Daniel Adam de Hoghton (born 1980)

== Notes ==
Baronetage of England
Preceded by Pelham baronets	De Hoghton baronets 22 May 1611	Succeeded by Hobart baronets
