= Langho =

Village in Lancashire, England

Coordinates: 53.805°N 2.449°W

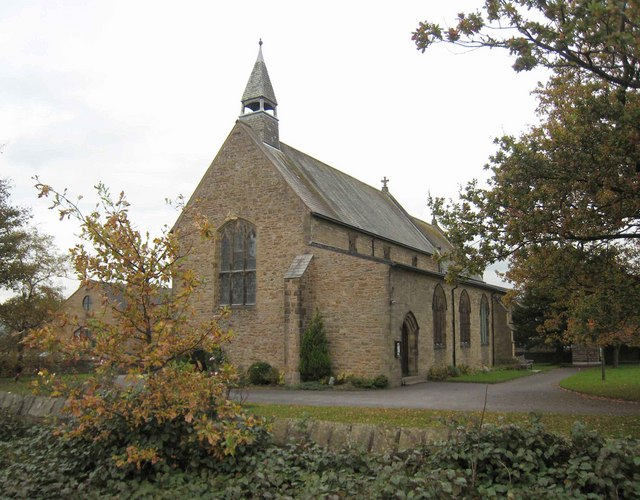
- St Leonard's Church, Langho

- Shown within Ribble Valley Location within Lancashire
- OS grid reference: SD705345
- Civil parish: Billington and Langho
- District: Ribble Valley
- Shire county: Lancashire
- Region: North West
- Country: England
- Sovereign state: United Kingdom
- Post town: BLACKBURN
- Postcode district: BB6
- Dialling code: 01254
- Police: Lancashire
- Fire: Lancashire
- Ambulance: North West
- UK Parliament: Ribble Valley

Langho is a small rural village 5 miles (8 km) north of Blackburn in the Ribble Valley, Lancashire, England. It is part of the parish of Billington and Langho. The village is linked with Blackburn and Clitheroe by the A666 road and is served by Langho railway station on the Ribble Valley Line. The population at the 2011 census was 2,015.

To the north, separated from the main village by the A59 road, is the original village of Old Langho. Further north there is Brockhall Village, a gated community developed in the 1990s on the site of a hospital. As of 2012, Northcote Manor, on Northcote Road, is the only restaurant in Lancashire with a Michelin star.

The original Old St Leonard's Church was replaced by the present church in 1880, though the old church is still used several times a year for special services and is supported by the Churches Conservation Trust. There is a Church of England Primary School in the village, also called St Leonard's. Saint Mary's Roman Catholic church and Saint Mary's Roman Catholic Primary School are located in Langho.

== See also ==
- Listed buildings in Billington and Langho
