= Nijmegen Helmet =

Facial iron mask of a Roman horseman

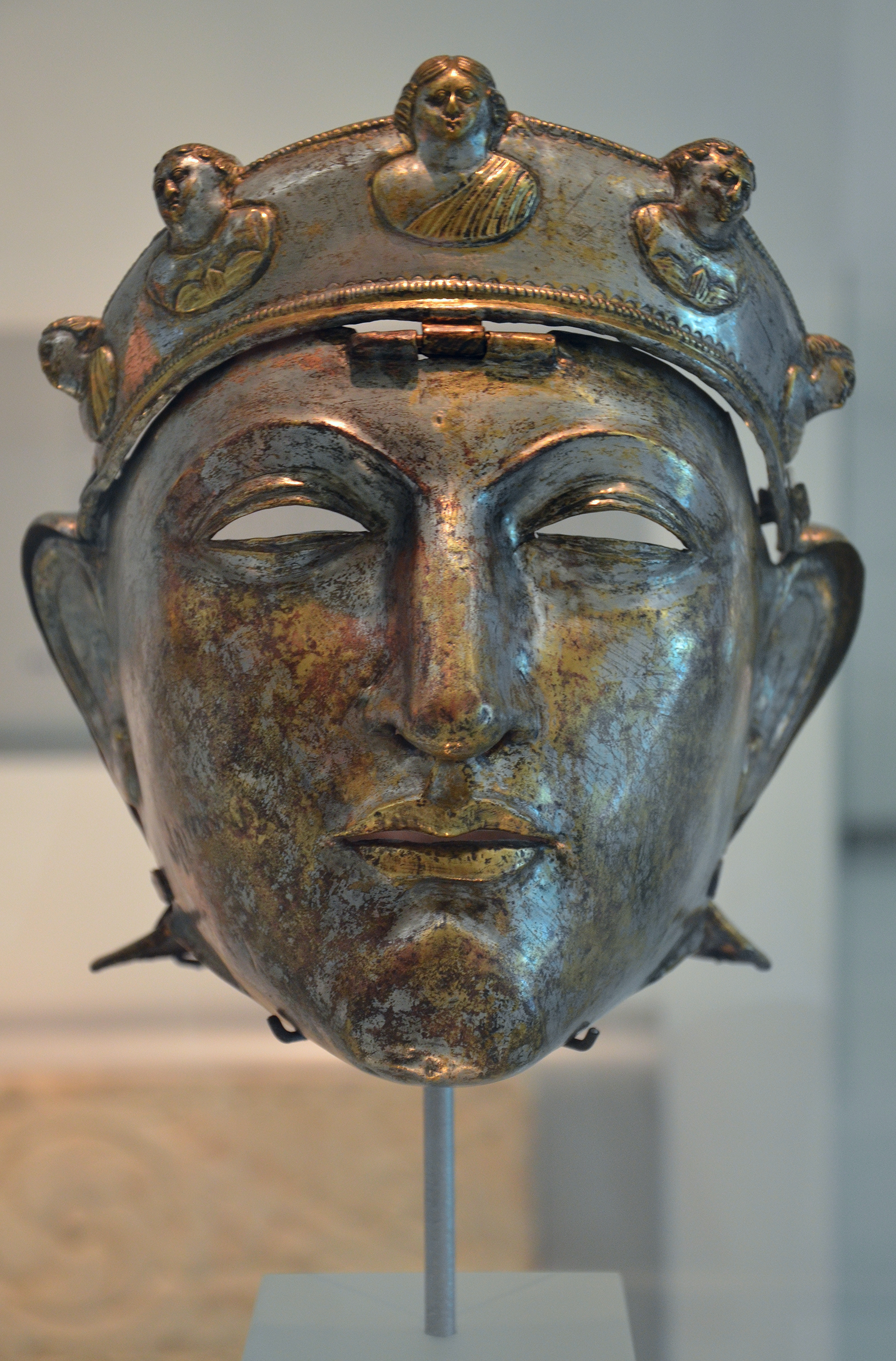
- Material: Iron, bronze, brass, silver
- Created: First or second century AD
- Discovered: Around 1915; Waal river, Nijmegen, Netherlands
- Present location: Valkhof Museum, Nijmegen

The Nijmegen Helmet is a Roman cavalry sports helmet from the first or second century AD. It was found around 1915 in a gravel bed on the left bank of the Waal river, near the Dutch city of Nijmegen. The helmet would have been worn by the élite Roman cavalry. The head portion of the helmet is made of iron, while the mask and diadem are of bronze or brass. The helmet provides neck protection via a projecting rim overlaid with a thin bronze covering plated with silver. The diadem features two male and three female figures.

Several other Roman sports helmets have also been found in or near Nijmegen.

== Description ==
The remaining portions of the helmet consist of three main parts: a face mask, a brow band, and ear and neck guards on either side. An iron skull cap was designed to closely follow the outline of the wearer's head, although due to significant oxidation, only fragments remain; what remains shows that it was originally skillfully hammered to represent elaborately dressed hair. The mask, made of silvered bronze, depicts a youthful face. The eyes, mouth, and nostrils have openings, and the lips and eyelids are gilded. The face extends outwards on the sides to cover the ears. These are covered by a separate piece of silvered bronze to protect the ears and neck. On the dexter cheek is scratched a name, suggested to be "Marcianus".

The brow band, or diadem, of the helmet is attached to the head-piece by a single horizontal hinge; additional straps would likely have originally been used to hold the helmet in place over the wearer's head. At the top and bottom of the brow band are beaded lines, between which five raised busts, three female and two male, are depicted. The band is silvered, and the beaded lines, like the busts' drapery, lips, eyelids, and hair, are gilded.

== Discovery ==
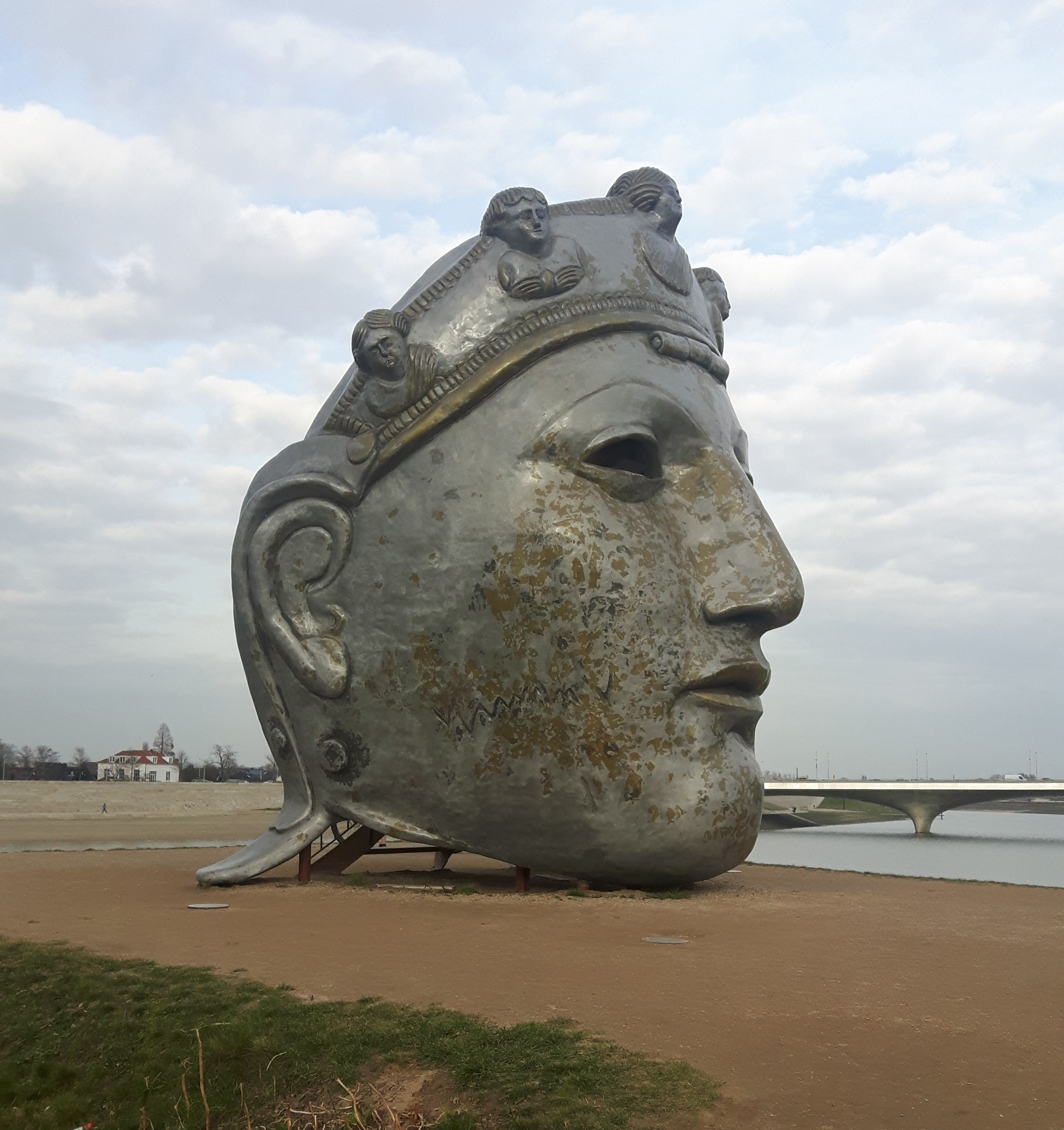
Het Gezicht van Nijmegen (The Face of Nijmegen), a 2020 sculpture by Andreas Hetfeld

The helmet was discovered in a gravel bed on the south bank of the Waal, under a railway bridge and below the Dutch city Nijmegen. Inside it were two cheek guards, evidently from a separate helmet, and several melon-shaped blue glass beads. On 2 March 1915 James Curle, a Scottish archaeologist, read a paper on the helmet to the Society for the Promotion of Roman Studies, which published the paper in its journal later that year; the helmet was described as "recently discovered", and "a recent addition" to the collection of Roman antiquities of Gerard Marius Kam, also of Nijmegen. Kam displayed the helmet in the self-built Kam Museum (nl), opened in 1922, which he donated to the government; the museum closed in 1998 to merge with the Commanderie van St. Jan (nl) museum and form the Valkhof Museum, where the helmet is now displayed.

In 2011, the helmet was displayed in England, at the Tullie House Museum and Art Gallery in Carlisle, Cumbria, marking the first time it had been exhibited in the United Kingdom and only the second time outside the Netherlands. The Tullie House Museum had the year before raised £1.97 million in an attempt to acquire the Crosby Garrett helmet at auction, but was outbid; the helmet was purchased by a private individual for £2,330,468.75.

== Typology ==
The Nijmegen helmet dates to the first century AD, or early second century, as indicated by its hairless brow and the shape of its eyes, lips, and chin. It is broadly classified as a cavalry sports helmet—type D, according to the typology put forward by H. Russell Robinson. Type D cavalry sports helmets are distinguished by two features: a horizontal hinge that attaches the face mask to the head piece, and a head piece made to resemble a decorated helmet.

== See also ==
- Newstead Helmet
- Hippika gymnasia

== Bibliography ==
- "Carlisle's Tullie House Museum to showcase Roman helmet". BBC News. British Broadcasting Corporation. 19 June 2011.
- Curle, James (1915). "On a Roman Visor Helmet Recently Discovered near Nijmegen, Holland". The Journal of Roman Studies. V. London: Society for the Promotion of Roman Studies: 81–86.
- "Geschiedenis". Museum het Valkhof Nijmegen. Archived from the original on 15 February 2018. (in Dutch)
- "Proceedings of the Society for the Promotion of Roman Studies, 1915". The Journal of Roman Studies. V. London: Society for the Promotion of Roman Studies: 251–253. 1915.
- Richmond, Ian A. (1943–1944). "Memoirs: James Curle" (PDF). Proceedings of the Society of Antiquaries of Scotland. Seventh Series. LXXVIII. Edinburgh: Society of Antiquaries of Scotland: 145–149.
- Ritchie, J. N. Graham (2002). "James Curle (1862–1944) and Alexander Ormiston Curle (1866–1955): Pillars of the Establishment" (PDF). Proceedings of the Society of Antiquaries of Scotland. 132. Edinburgh: Society of Antiquaries of Scotland: 19–41.
- Robinson, H. Russell (1975). The Armour of Imperial Rome. New York: Charles Scribner's Sons. ISBN 0-684-13956-1.
- Willems, Willem J. H. (1992). "Roman face masks from the Kops Plateau, Nijmegen, The Netherlands" (PDF). Journal of Roman Military Equipment Studies. 3: 57–66.
- Enckevort, Harry van & Willems, Willem J. H. (1994). "Roman cavalry helmets in ritual hoards from the Kops Plateau at Nijmegen, The Netherlands". Journal of Roman Military Equipment Studies. 5: 125–137.
- van Capelleveen, Ruud (19 June 2011). "Achter het zilveren masker" [Behind the silver mask]. CultuurArchief.nl (in Dutch). Absolute Figures.
- Worrell, Sally; Jackson, Ralph; Mackay, Andrew; Bland, Roger; Pitts, Mike & Bradbury, Darren (January–February 2011). "The Crosby Garrett Roman Helmet". British Archaeology (116). Archived from the original on 1 February 2014.
