= Hallaton Helmet =

Decorated iron Roman cavalry parade helmet

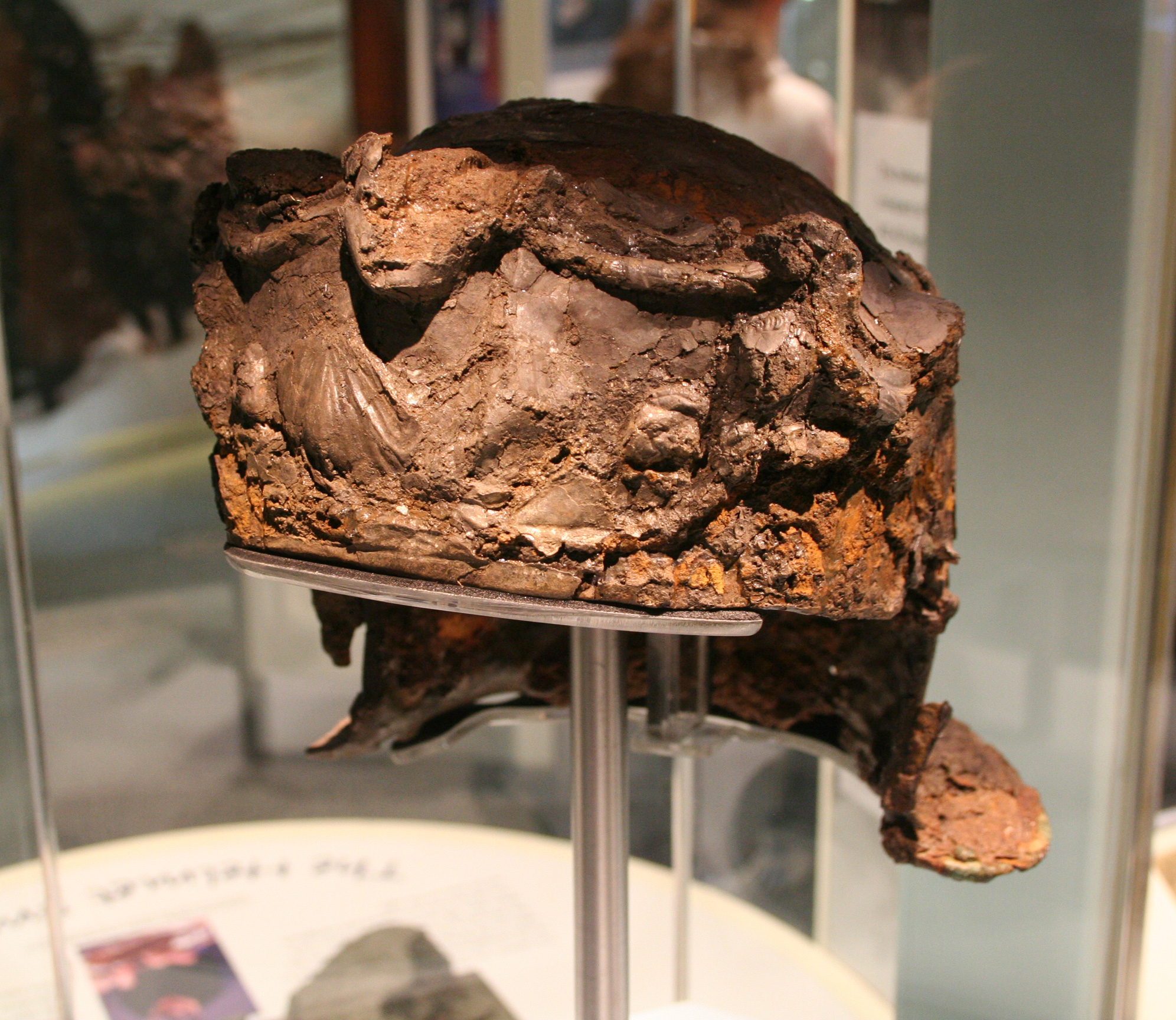
- The Hallaton Helmet
- Material: Iron
- Size: 407 millimetres (16.0 in) high
- Created: Roman, 1st century AD
- Discovered: By amateur archaeologists in 2000
- Place: Hallaton, Leicestershire
- Present location: Harborough Museum

The Hallaton Helmet is a decorated iron Roman cavalry parade helmet originally covered in a sheet of silver and decorated in places with gold leaf. It was discovered in 2000 near Hallaton, Leicestershire after Ken Wallace, a member of the Hallaton Fieldwork Group, found coins in the area. Further investigation by professional archaeologists from the University of Leicester Archaeological Services discovered that the site appeared to have been used as a large-scale Iron Age shrine. Nine years of conservation and restoration have been undertaken by experts from the British Museum, supported by a Heritage Lottery Fund grant of £650,000. The helmet is now on permanent display at the Harborough Museum in Market Harborough alongside other artefacts from the Hallaton Treasure hoard.

Although it was found shattered into thousands of pieces and is now heavily corroded, the helmet still bears evidence of its original finely decorated design. It was plated with silver-gilt and decorated with images of goddesses and equestrian scenes. It would have been used by a Roman auxiliary cavalryman for displays and possibly in battle. The identity of the owner is not known but the helmet was discovered on a native British ceremonial site, buried alongside thousands of Iron Age British and Roman coins. It is possible that the helmet was owned by a Briton who fought alongside the Romans during the Roman conquest of Britain.

== Description and interpretation ==
The helmet is an example of a three-piece Roman ceremonial cavalry helmet, made of sheet iron covered with silver sheet and partly decorated with gold leaf. Such helmets were worn by Roman auxiliary cavalrymen in displays known as hippika gymnasia and may also have been worn in battle, despite their relative thinness and lavish decoration. Horses and riders wore lavishly decorated clothes, armour and plumes while performing feats of horsemanship and re-enacting historical and legendary battles, such as the wars of the Greeks and Trojans.

It is the only Roman helmet ever found in Britain that still has most of its silver-gilt plating attached. The helmet would originally have had two cheekpieces attached via holes in front of its ear guards. It has a prominent browguard, the shape of which is similar to that of the 3rd-century Guisborough Helmet, discovered in 1864 near Guisborough in Redcar and Cleveland. The rear of the helmet bowl descended to form a neckguard.

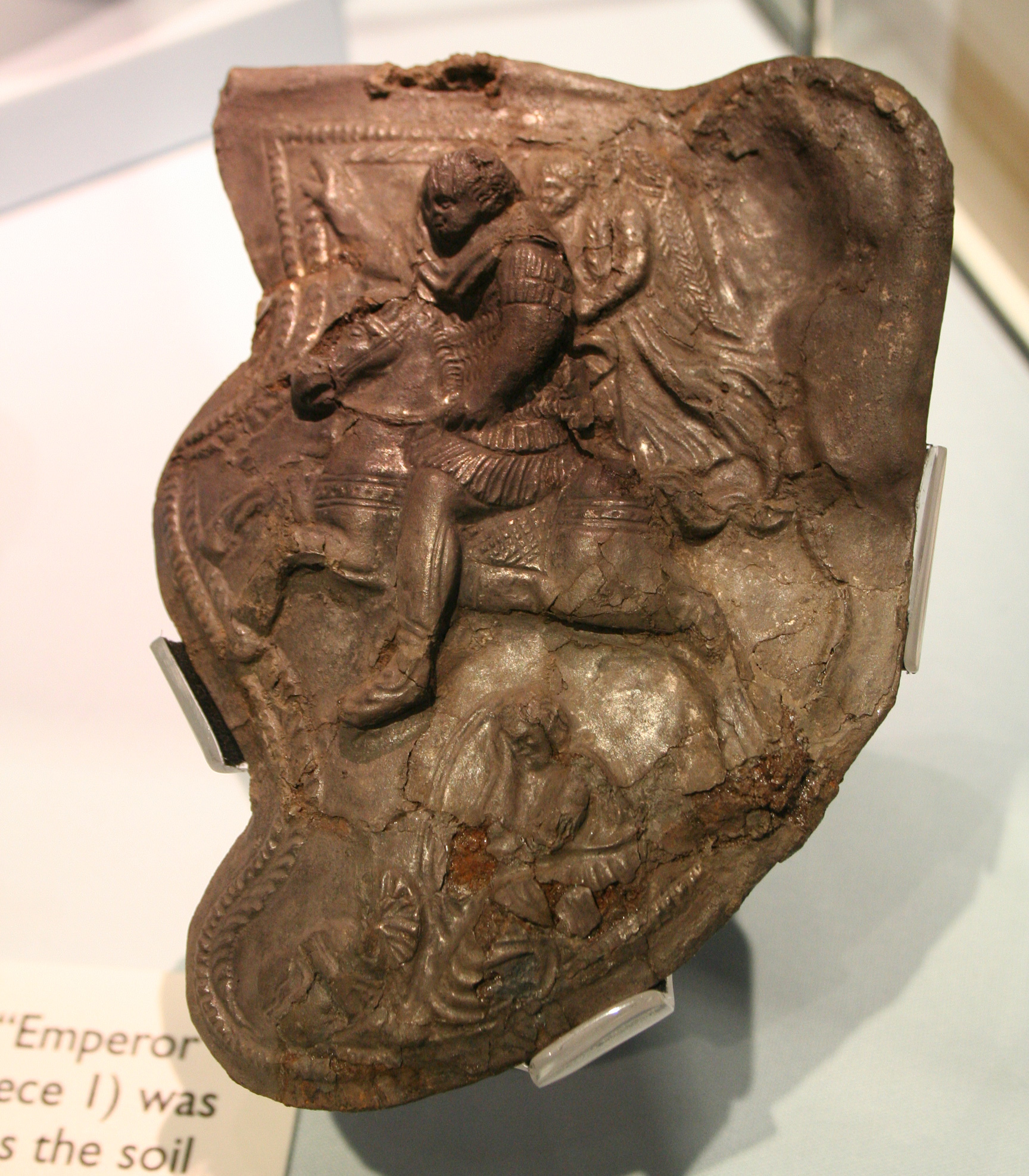
The "Emperor" cheekpiece (no. 1), depicting a Roman emperor being crowned by Victory while trampling a barbarian under his horse's hooves

As is the case with other Roman cavalry helmets, the Hallaton Helmet was very ornately decorated. The closest parallel to the Hallaton Helmet in terms of overall appearance is a helmet found in Xanten-Wardt in Germany which, like the Hallaton example, is made of silver-gilded iron with a wreath on the crown, a central figure on the browguard and a garland of flowers on the neckguard. A number of similar features have survived on the Hallaton Helmet. Its bowl is decorated with laurel wreaths while the scalloped browguard is edged with elaborate cabling. In the centre of the browguard is the (now heavily damaged) bust of a woman flanked by repoussé lions. Her identity is unclear, but she may have been an empress or goddess. The iconography is reminiscent of depictions of Cybele, the Magna Mater or "Great Mother" whose image was used to promote the values of the Augustan period a few decades after the helmet was deposited. However, the depiction has a number of features that are more in common with funerary art.

The ear guards are in the shape of silver ears, and the neckguard is decorated with a scrolling leaf pattern. Six detached cheekpieces were found within the helmet bowl along with the disintegrated remains of a seventh, although only two would have been needed. Hinges were also found, as was the pin of one cheekpiece, which had been bent. It may have been forcibly removed or possibly sustained damage at a later date, perhaps from a plough. It is unclear why there were so many cheekpieces accompanying the helmet; it is possible that they may all have been used on the same helmet to customise its appearance on different occasions, or alternatively they may have been intended as spares in the event of damage. The surviving cheekpieces are very elaborate. Five of the cheekpieces show equestrian scenes; one depicts the triumph of a Roman emperor on horseback, holding his arm in the air as he is crowned with a laurel wreath by the goddess Victoria (Victory). A cowering barbarian is depicted below being trampled by the hooves of the emperor's horse. Another less well-preserved cheekpiece depicts a possibly Middle Eastern figure holding a large cornucopia, and a Roman helmet and shield below.

The helmet was found along with some 5,296 Iron Age and Roman coins mostly dating to AD 20/30–50, the largest assemblage of Iron Age coins ever found in Britain. They had been buried at what appears to have been a pre-Roman shrine where large-scale animal slaughtering had taken place; nearly 7,000 bone fragments were also found at the site, 97 per cent of which were from pigs. Many appear to have been buried without the meat being eaten, suggesting that they had been used as offerings. The site is located on a hilltop which appears to have been encircled by a boundary ditch and palisade, with a possible processional way leading up to it. In Roman times it would have been located in the territory of the Corieltauvi, who inhabited an area of the East Midlands stretching from Northamptonshire to Lincolnshire.

It is very unusual to find a helmet of this type on a native ceremonial site. It was probably made between 25 and 50 AD, close to the date of the conquest of Britain in 43 AD; this makes it one of the earliest Roman helmets ever found in Britain. Other British examples of later date were found in isolation away from settlements, as in the cases of the Guisborough Helmet and Crosby Garrett Helmet, or on Roman sites, as with the Newstead Helmet. Various suggestions have been put forward as to why the helmet ended up at Hallaton; it may have been owned by a Briton who served in the Roman cavalry, it may have been a diplomatic gift from the Romans or it may have been captured in war. According to Dr Jeremy Hill of the British Museum, the first explanation is the most likely: "Here you probably have a situation where local Britons are fighting on the Roman side." The Roman cavalry at this time was mostly recruited from native allies, not Italians, suggesting that Britons fought alongside the Romans as they carried out their conquest of Britain.

== Discovery and restoration ==
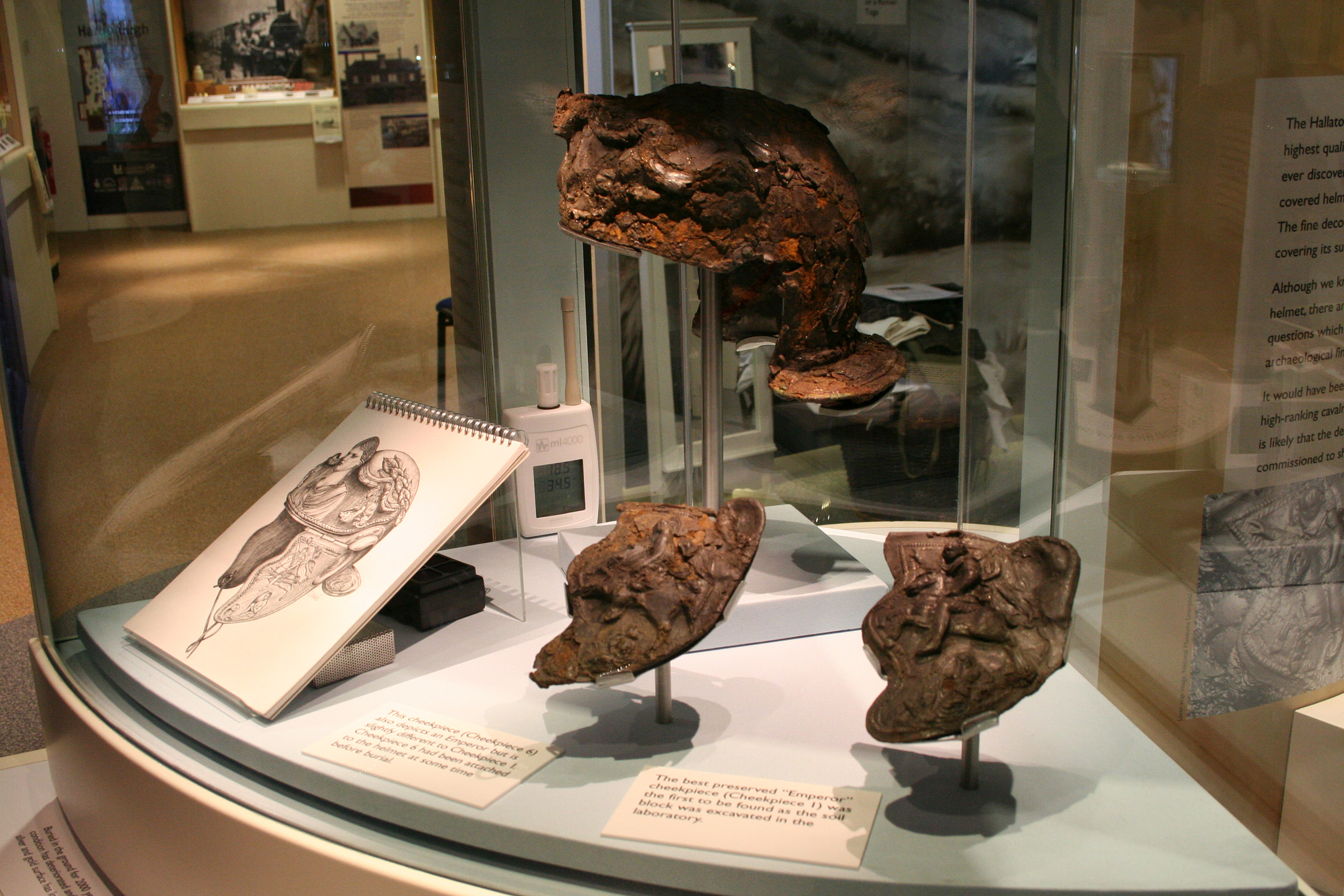
The Hallaton Helmet and cheekpieces on display at the Harborough Museum, Market Harborough

The helmet was discovered by 71-year-old Ken Wallace, a retired teacher and amateur archaeologist. He and other members of the Hallaton Fieldwork Group had found fragments of Roman pottery on a hill near Hallaton in 2000. He visited the site with a second-hand metal detector late one afternoon and found about 200 coins, which had been buried in a series of small pits dug into the clay. He also found another artifact, which he left in the ground overnight. The following day he returned to examine his discovery and found it that it was a silver ear. He reported the find to Leicestershire's county archaeologist, who called in the University of Leicester Archaeological Services (ULAS) to excavate the site. The dig took place in the spring of 2003.

The helmet was too fragile to be excavated in situ so it was removed within a block of earth held together with plaster of Paris. It was taken to the British Museum in London for conservation, which took nine years of work by conservator Marilyn Hockey and her colleagues Fleur Shearman and Duygu Çamurcuoğlu. Corrosion and the effects of time had shattered the helmet into thousands of pieces, most of which were smaller than the nail on a person's little finger. The reconstructed and conserved helmet was unveiled in January 2012.

Leicester County Council was able to raise £1 million to buy the entire hoard and pay for the conservation of the helmet, with the assistance of donations from the Heritage Lottery Fund (which gave a £650,000 grant), the Art Fund and other trusts and charities. The helmet was valued at £300,000; under the terms of the Treasure Act, Ken Wallace and the landowner were each awarded £150,000.

The helmet was put on permanent public display at the end of January 2012 at the Harborough Museum in Market Harborough, nine miles from the site where the hoard was found, alongside other objects found at Hallaton.
