= Crosby Garrett Helmet =

Copper alloy Roman cavalry helmet

Coordinates: 54.479°N 2.420°W

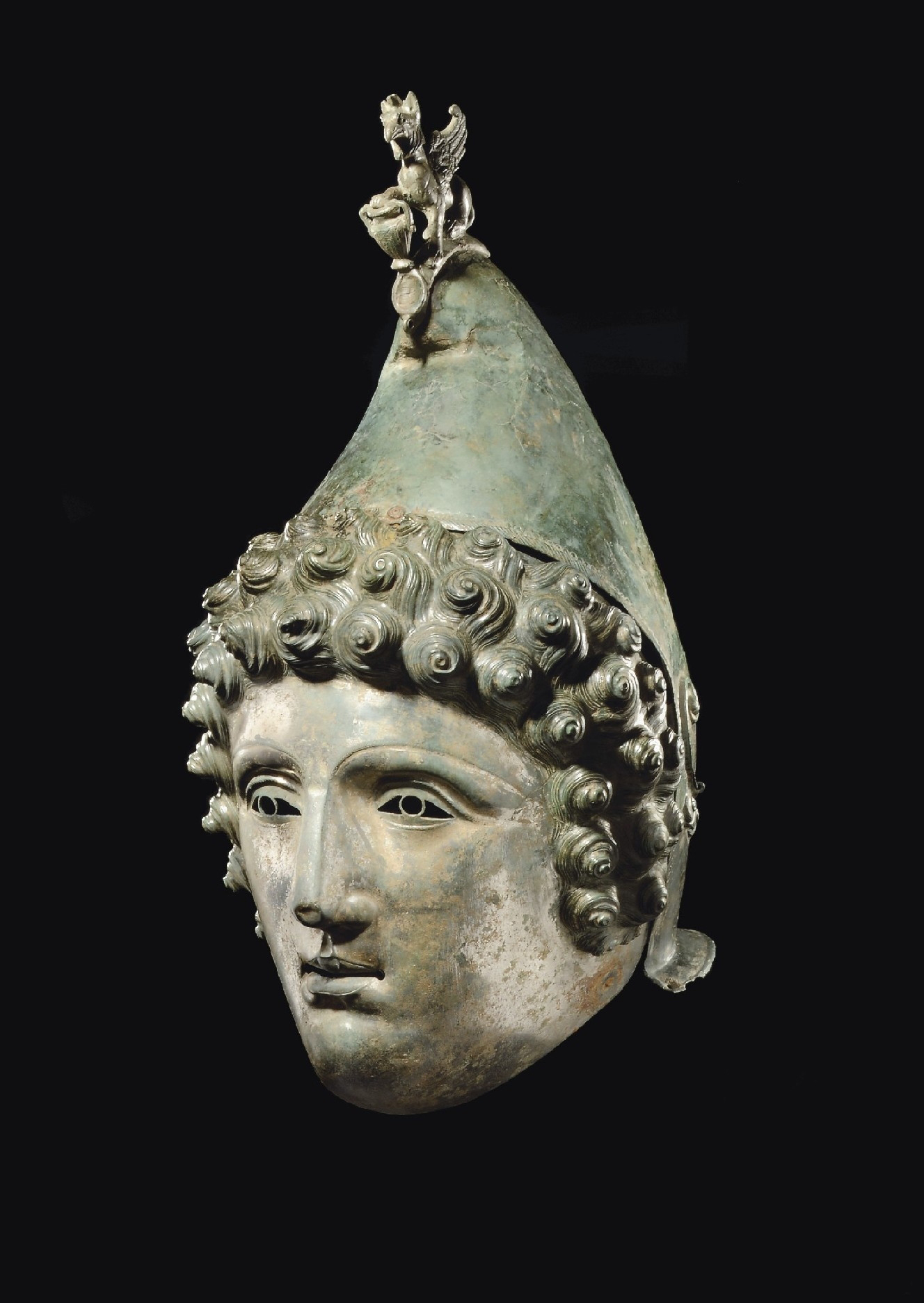
- Material: Copper alloy
- Size: 407 millimetres (16.0 in) high
- Created: Roman, 2nd–3rd century AD
- Discovered: By a metal detectorist in May 2010
- Place: Crosby Garrett, Cumbria
- Present location: Private possession

The Crosby Garrett Helmet is a copper alloy Roman cavalry helmet dating from the late 2nd or early 3rd century AD. It was found by an unnamed metal detectorist near Crosby Garrett in Cumbria, England, in May 2010. Later investigations found that a Romano-British farming settlement had occupied the site where the helmet was discovered, which was located a few miles away from a Roman road and a Roman army fort. It is possible that the owner of the helmet was a local inhabitant who had served with the Roman cavalry.

The helmet appears to have been deliberately folded up and deposited in an artificial stone structure. It is thought to have been used for ceremonial occasions rather than for combat, and may already have been an antique by the time it was buried. It is of the same type as the Newstead Helmet (found near Melrose in Scotland in 1905). Its facial features are more akin to those of helmets found in southern Europe although its design also has similarities with the Ribchester Helmet (found in 1796) and the Hallaton Helmet (found in North Yorkshire in 2000). Its design may allude to the Trojans, whose exploits the Romans re-enacted in cavalry tournaments.

Ralph Jackson, Senior Curator of Romano-British Collections at the British Museum, has described the helmet as "... an immensely interesting and outstandingly important find ... Its face mask is both extremely finely wrought and chillingly striking, but it is as an ensemble that the helmet is so exceptional and, in its specifics, unparalleled. It is a find of the greatest national (and, indeed, international) significance."

On 7 October 2010, the helmet was sold at Christie's for £2.3 million (US$3.6 million) to an undisclosed private buyer. Tullie House Museum and Art Gallery in Carlisle sought to purchase the helmet with the support of the British Museum, but was outbid. The helmet has so far been publicly displayed four times, once in a 2012 exhibition at the Royal Academy of Arts, at Tullie House in 2013–14, and at the British Museum in 2014. The helmet returned to Tullie House to be displayed in the Hadrian's Cavalry exhibition in the summer of 2017.

== Description ==
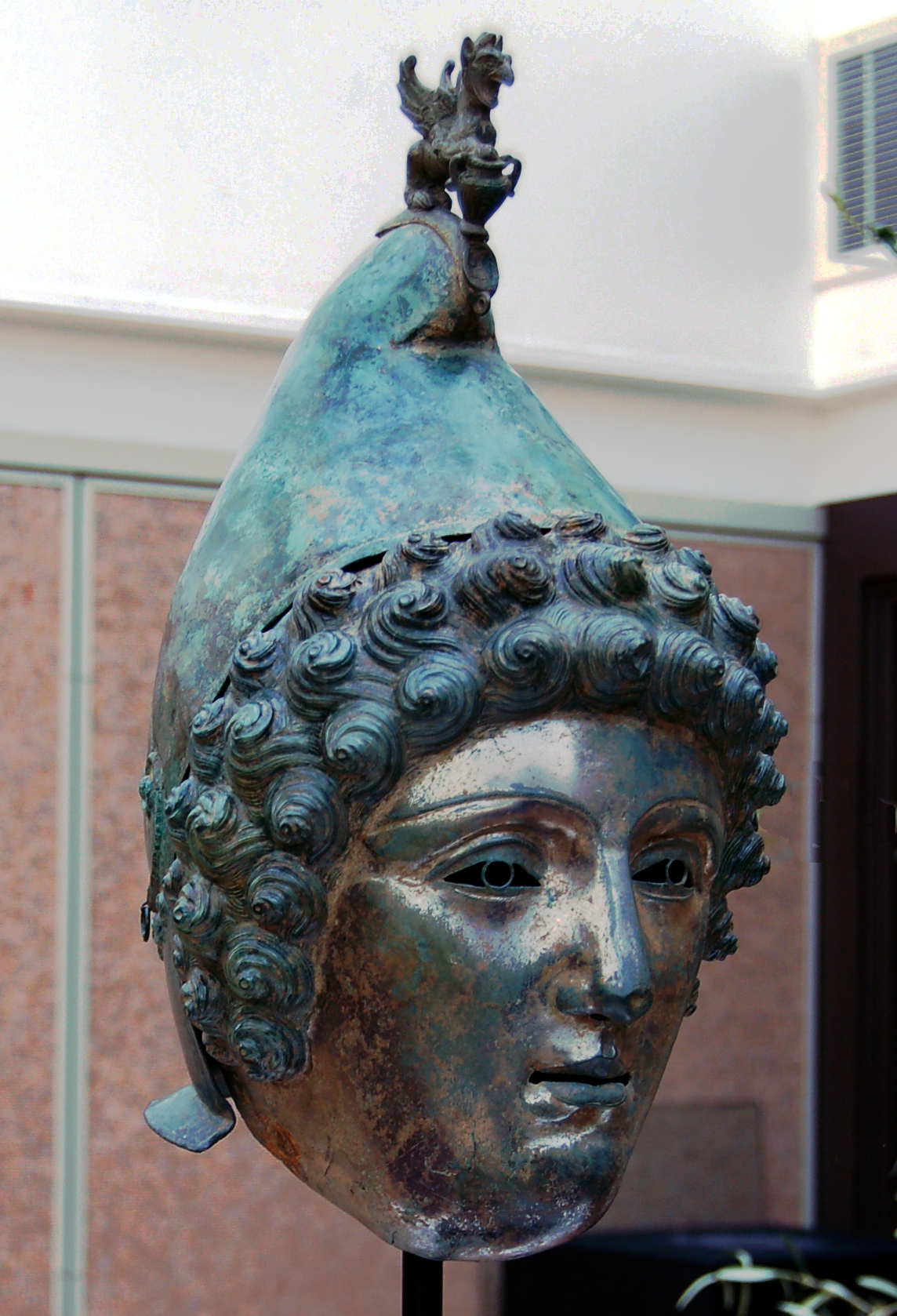
The helmet on display at Christie's in 2010

The Crosby Garrett helmet is an almost complete example of a two-piece Roman cavalry helmet. The visor portrays the face of a youthful, clean-shaven male with curly hair. The headpiece is in the shape of a Phrygian cap, on the crest of which is a winged griffin that stands with one raised foot resting on an amphora. The visor was originally attached to the headpiece by means of a hinge; the iron hinge pin has not survived, but its existence has been inferred from the presence of powdery deposits of iron oxide residue. The helmet would have been held in place using a leather strap attached from the wearer's neck to a decorated rivet on either side of the helmet, below the ear. Wear marks caused by opening and closing the visor are still visible, and at some point the helmet was repaired using a bronze sheet which was riveted across two splits. Only two other Roman helmets complete with visors have been found in Britain: the Newstead Helmet and Ribchester Helmet.

The helmet and visor were cast from an alloy consisting of an average of 82% copper, 10% zinc and 8% tin. This alloy was probably derived from melted-down scrap brass with a low zinc content, with which some tin had been added to improve the quality of the casting. Some of the fragments show traces of a white metal coating, indicating that the visor would originally have been tinned to give the appearance of silver. The griffin was cast separately from a different alloy consisting of 68% copper, 4% zinc, 18% tin and 10% lead. The visor would originally have been a silver hue and the helmet would have had a coppery yellow appearance. The helmet's creation can be dated to the late 2nd or early 3rd century from the use of a particular type of decorated rivet as well as some of its design features, such as its pierced eyes.

There has been much debate about the symbolic meaning of the helmet's design. The griffin was the companion of Nemesis, the goddess of vengeance and fate. They were both seen as agents of death and were often linked with gladiatorial combat. The meaning of the face and headpiece are less clearly identifiable. Suggestions have ranged from the Greek god Attis and the hero Perseus, to the Roman gods Mithras and Jupiter Dolichenus, to a more general Eastern Mediterranean appearance that could possibly have been meant to suggest a Trojan identity. The Phrygian cap was often used by the Romans as a visual motif representing the Trojans. Another interpretation believes that it could be an Amazon due to the Phrygian hat and the tap.

== Discovery and restoration ==
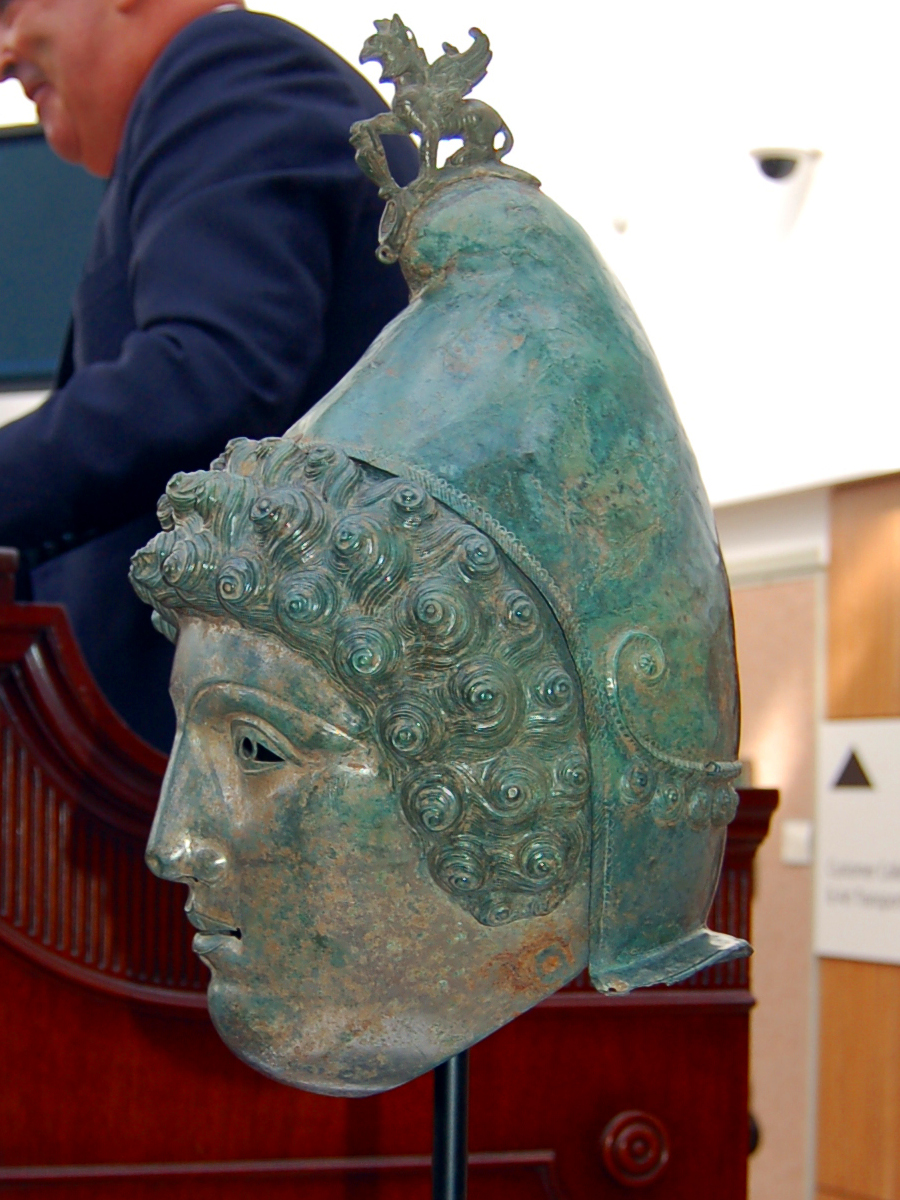
Side view of the helmet

The helmet and visor were found in May 2010 in pastureland on a farm owned by Eric Robinson at Crosby Garrett in Cumbria. The finder, an unnamed metal detectorist in his 20s from Peterlee, County Durham, had been detecting with his father in two adjacent fields for some years but had previously only discovered some Roman coins and other small artefacts. The findspot is situated not far from a Roman road. A number of earthworks are located nearby, indicating the presence of a previously unrecorded ancient settlement. The area was strategically placed on the route to the northern frontier of Roman Britain within the territory of the Carvetii tribe. The Roman army would have been present in the area and would certainly have used the nearby road. A Roman auxiliary fort stood only 9 kilometres (5.6 mi) to the north-east at Verterae (Brough Castle).

Following the helmet's discovery, the area around the findspot was investigated in a project sponsored by the Tullie House Museum and Art Gallery and the Portable Antiquities Scheme. The earthworks noted earlier were found to be part of a substantial enclosure surrounded by ditches, within which buildings had once stood. The enclosure, which measures as much as 500 metres (1,600 ft) long on its southern side, combines both native British and Roman methods of fortification. A sunken area within the enclosure may possibly have served as a paddock for horses, while the evidence for the buildings is concentrated in the enclosure's northern portion. The remnants of Romano-British field systems in the surrounding area show that the area was under cultivation and animal remains found on the site indicate that the inhabitants also raised livestock, including sheep, goats and pigs. The presence of Roman pottery suggests that the inhabitants had adopted some elements of the Roman lifestyle, but their community may well have been there long before the Romans arrived. Archaeological evidence from the enclosure indicates that the site may have been first settled as far back as the Bronze Age, at least 1,000 years before the helmet was deposited.

The finder discovered the helmet and visor buried together some 25 cm (10 in) below the surface, at a site located on a ledge at the lower end of the settlement. It had been placed onto two stone slabs at the bottom of a hole which had been back-filled with soil. A stone cap had been laid on top. The helmet was found in 33 large fragments and 34 small fragments and had apparently been folded before burial. The visor was mostly intact and had been placed face down. The griffin had become detached and was found with the helmet. No other artefacts were found at the time, but the subsequent Tullie House/PAS excavations at the findspot discovered a number of copper and iron objects, a bead and two Roman coins dating to 330–337. The coins were found within the artificial stone feature in which the helmet had been deposited and may have been buried at the same time.

The finder did not initially realise that he had found a Roman artefact and thought at first that it was a Victorian ornament. He eventually identified it as Roman by consulting auction catalogues, searching the Internet and getting advice from dealers. Find Liaison Officers from the Portable Antiquities Scheme were notified of the discovery and visited the findspot along with the finder. Christie's commissioned Darren Bradbury, an independent conservator and restorer, to restore the helmet and visor for sale. Although Christie's was asked to delay the restoration so that a full scientific examination could be carried out, this request was not granted and information about the helmet's burial may have been lost as a result. However, the British Museum was able to inspect the find during restoration and X-ray fluorescence spectrometry was carried out to determine the composition of the headpiece, visor and griffin. Bradbury's restoration work took some 240 hours and involved the repair of cracks and holes using resin and cyanoacrylate ("Super Glue"), retouched to match the appearance of the surrounding material.

== Similarities and usage ==
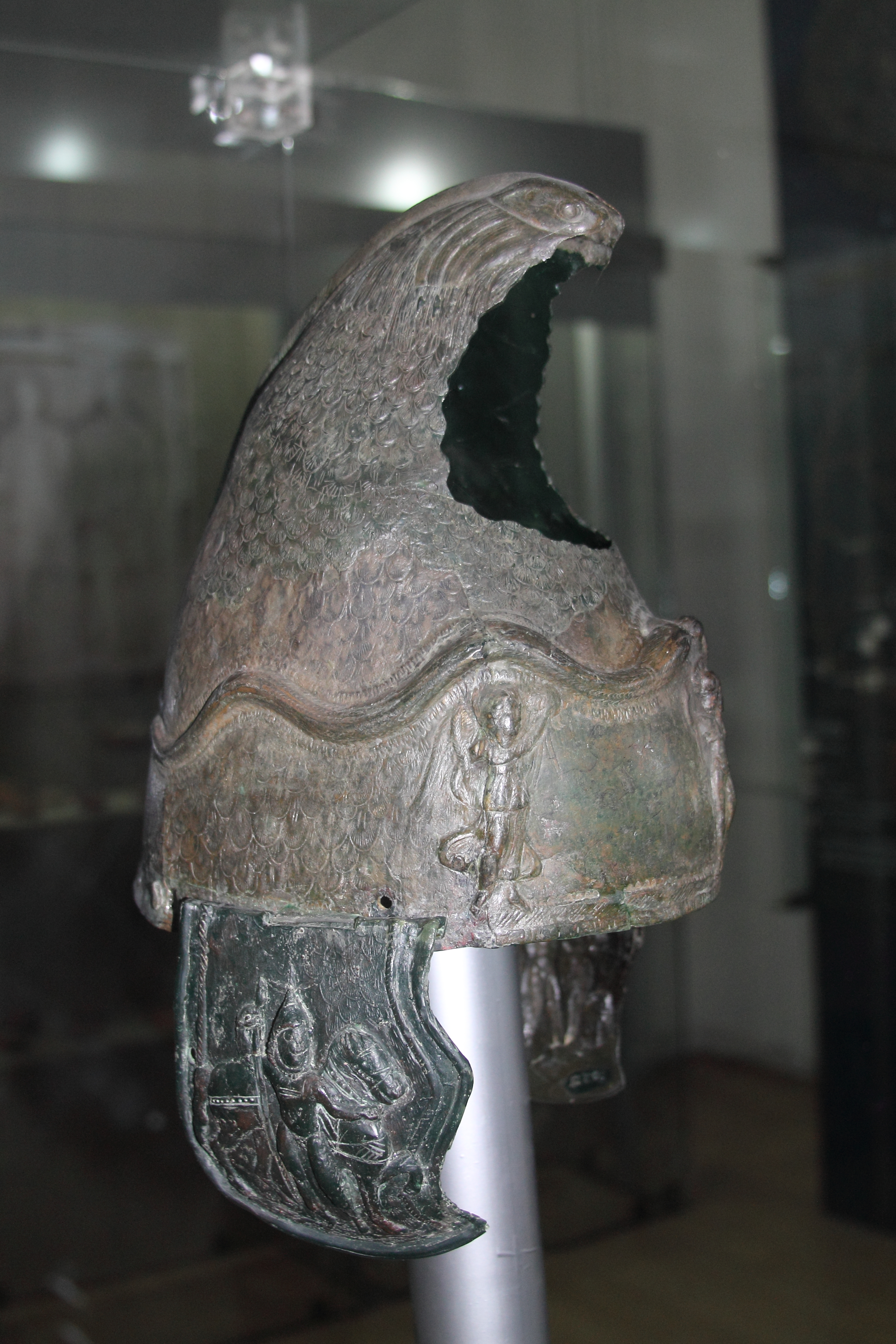
The Ostrov Helmet from Romania, which has a similar "Phrygian cap" design

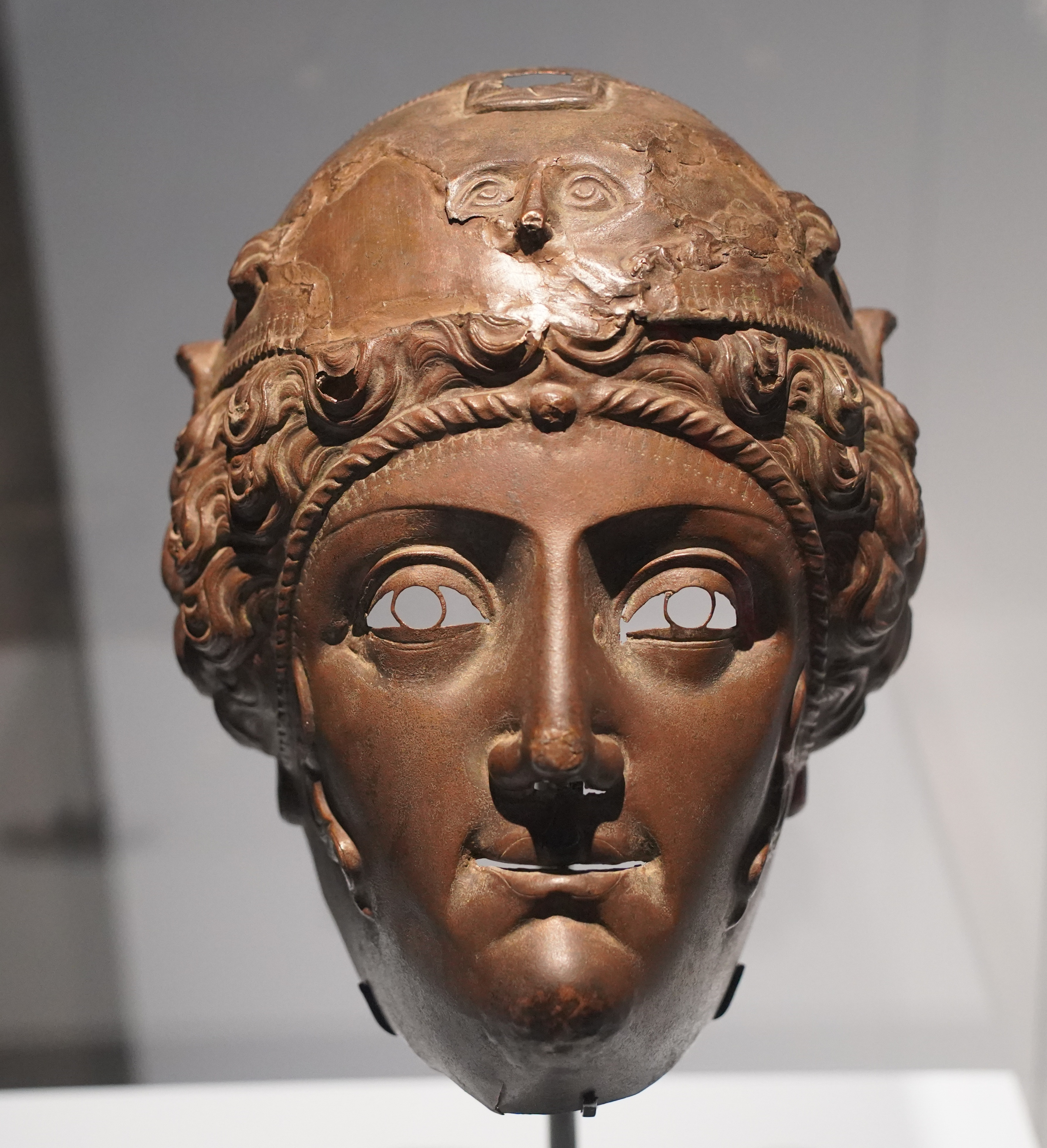
A 2nd-century bronze parade mask from a Roman tomb at Nola (British Museum)

The helmet and visor have marked similarities to a number of other Roman cavalry helmets. The visor is a cavalry sports type C (H. Russell Robinson classification) or type V (Maria Kohlert classification). Similar examples have been found across the Roman Empire from Britain to Syria. It is of the same type as the Newstead Helmet, found in Scotland in 1905, and its facial features most closely parallel a helmet that was found at Nola in Italy and is now in the British Museum. The rendering of the hair is similar to that of a type C helmet found at Belgrade in Serbia and dated to the 2nd century AD. The griffin ornament is unique, though it may parallel a lost "sphinx of bronze" that may originally have been attached to the crest of the Ribchester Helmet, discovered in Lancashire in 1796. The headpiece is nearly unique; only one other example in the form of a Phrygian cap has been found, in a fragmentary state, at Ostrov in Romania, dated to the second half of the 2nd century AD. Rings on the back of the helmet and on the griffin may have been used to attach colourful streamers or ribbons.

Such helmets were used for hippika gymnasia, cavalry tournaments that were performed in front of emperors and senior commanders. Horses and riders wore lavishly decorated clothes, armour and plumes while performing feats of horsemanship and re-enacting historical and legendary battles, such as the wars of the Greeks and Trojans. According to the Roman writer Arrian:

[T]hose of high rank or superior in horsemanship wear gilded helmets of iron or bronze to draw the attention of the spectators. Unlike the helmets made for active service, these do not cover the head and cheeks only but are made to fit all round the faces of the riders with apertures for the eyes ... From the helmets hang yellow plumes, a matter of décor as much as utility. As the horses move forward, the slightest breeze adds to the beauty of these plumes.— Arrian, Ars Tactica 34

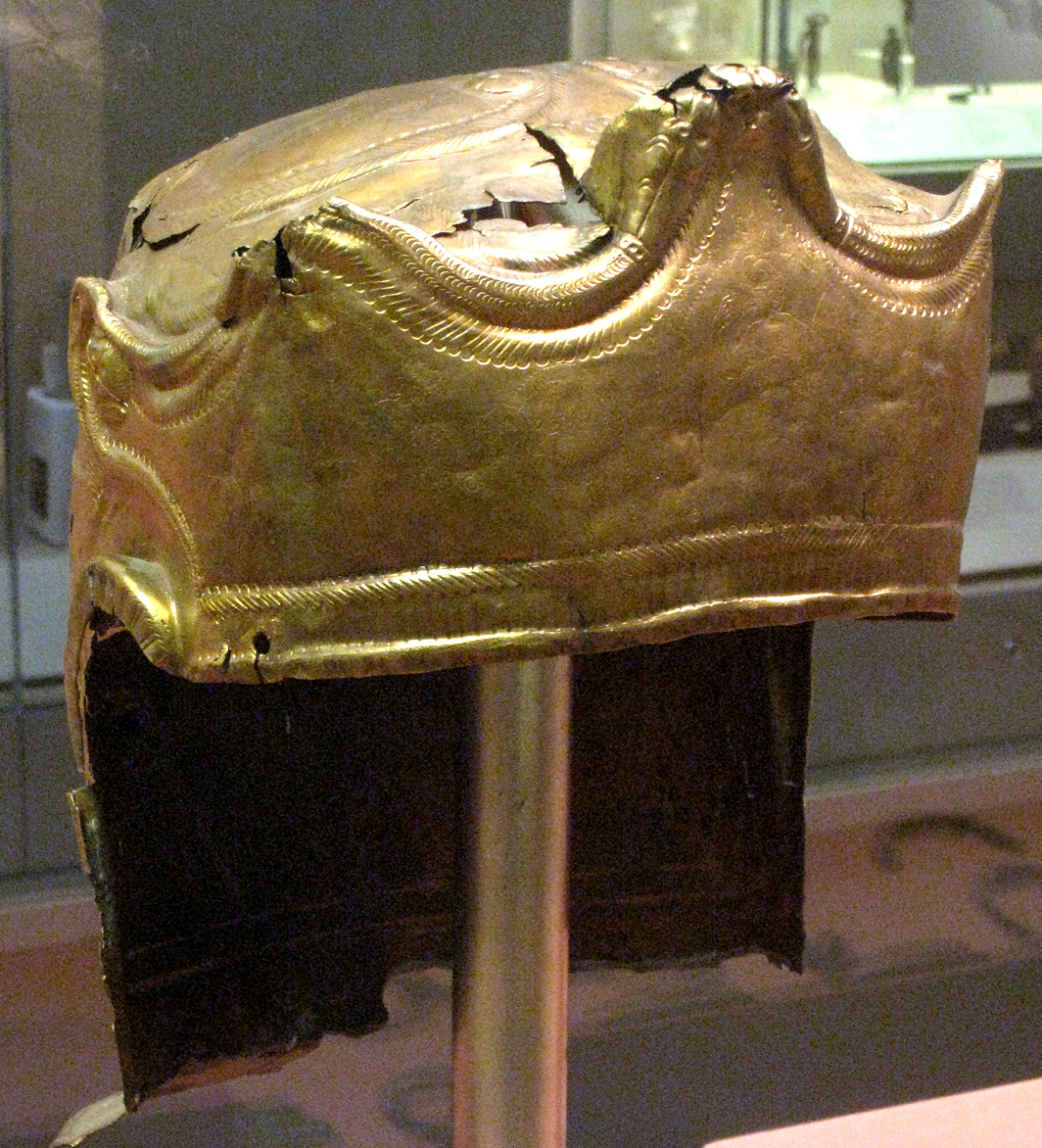
The Guisborough Helmet

Combat gear was issued by and belonged to the Roman army, and had to be returned at the end of a wearer's service. Cavalry sports equipment appears to have been treated differently, as soldiers apparently privately commissioned and purchased it for their own use. They evidently retained it after they completed their service. Both helmets and visors have been found in graves and other contexts away from obvious military sites, as well as being deposited in forts and their vicinity. In some cases they were carefully folded up and buried, as in the case of the Guisborough Helmet. The Dutch historian Johan Nicolay has identified a "lifecycle" for Roman military equipment in which ex-soldiers took certain items home with them as a reminder of their service and occasionally disposed of them away from garrison sites as grave goods or votive offerings.

The circumstances in which the Crosby Garret helmet was buried are still unclear, but the discoveries made by the post-discovery Tullie House/PAS excavations have provided much more detail about its context. It was clearly deposited within an artificial feature that had been specially constructed; Stuart Noon of the Museum of Lancashire suggests that the feature may have been intended as a memorial of some sort. It was not buried in an isolated spot but within a long-occupied Romano-British farming settlement that had clearly adopted aspects of Roman culture. Given the settlement's proximity to Roman military locations, it is very possible that some of its inhabitants served with the Roman army, which often recruited mounted auxiliaries from among native peoples. The helmet may well already have been a valuable antique at the time of its burial; if the coins found nearby reflect when it was buried, it could have been over a century old by the time it was deposited. It was deliberately broken before being buried in what may have been intended as a ritual sacrifice. The identity of its owner will never be known, but it could have been that a local inhabitant who had formerly served with the Roman cavalry was responsible for the helmet's deposition.

== Auction and controversy ==
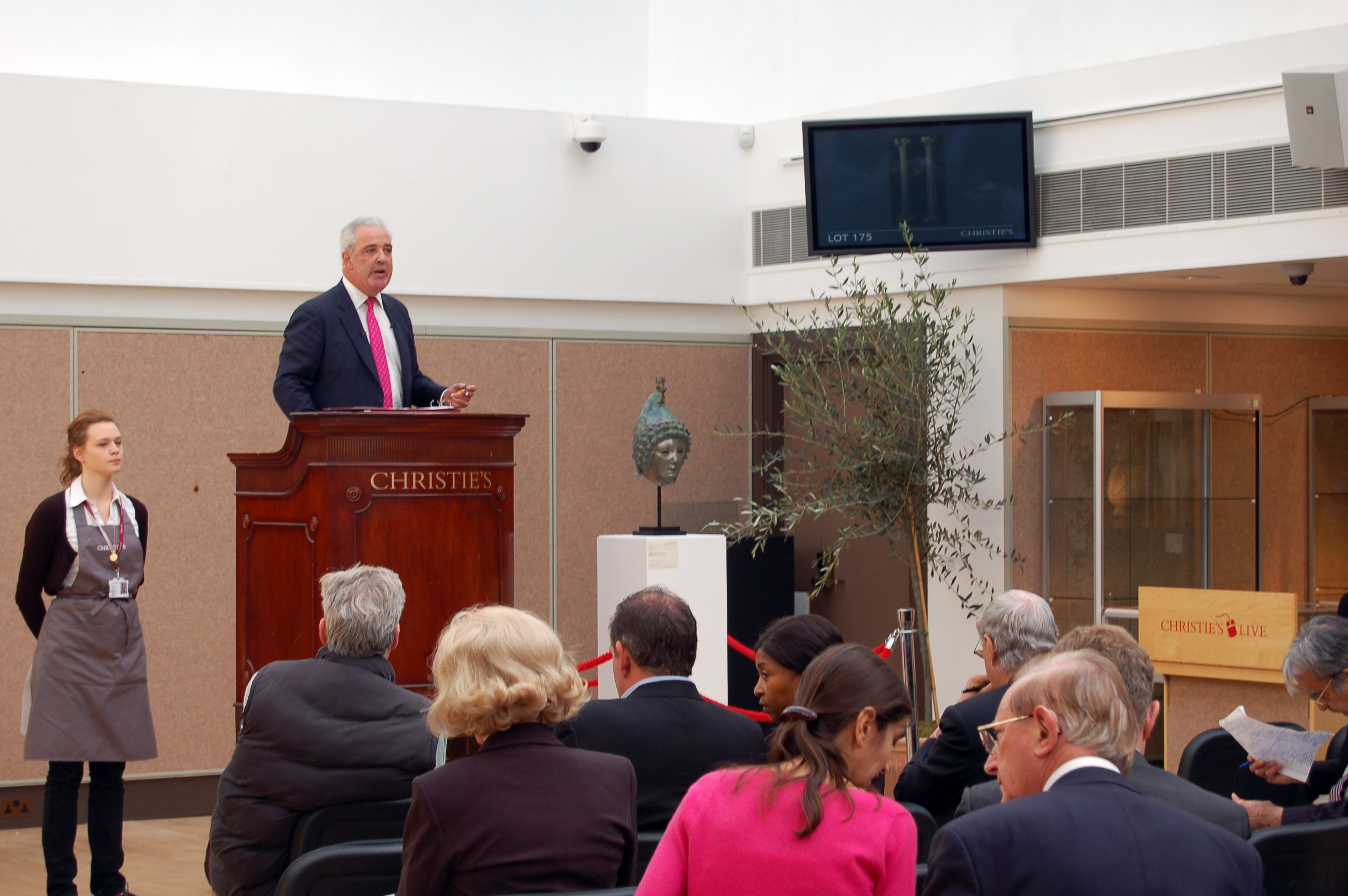
The helmet on auction at Christie's auction house in London on 7 October 2010

Although the find was reported under the Portable Antiquities Scheme, it was not declared treasure under the 1996 Treasure Act because single items of non-precious metal are not covered by the act. The finder and landowner were thus free to dispose of the helmet as they saw fit. The discovery was publicly announced by Christie's in mid-September 2010; the helmet was the centrepiece of its 7 October auction catalogue, featuring on the cover and six more pages. Its value was put at £200,000 – £300,000. The Tullie House Museum and Art Gallery launched an appeal with the aim of purchasing the helmet and making it the focus of a new Roman frontier gallery due to open in 2011. The campaign immediately attracted numerous donations, including £50,000 from an anonymous overseas benefactor who offered the sum if a matching sum could be raised by the public (it was); a £1 million offer from the National Heritage Memorial Fund; a £300,000 pledge from the Headley Trust and the Monument Trust; £200,000 from the Art Fund; and £75,000 from the J Paul Getty Jr Charitable Trust. By the time of the auction three and a half weeks after the campaign had been launched, the museum had raised enough money to support a bid of up to £1.7 million. Behind the scenes, efforts were made to persuade the finder and landowner to agree a private sale with the museum, but these approaches failed.

The initial estimate was passed within seconds of the auction opening. Six bidders pushed the price towards a million pounds and Tullie House was forced to drop out at £1.7 million. Two remaining bidders took the bid past £2 million; the winning bidder, an anonymous UK resident and fine art collector bidding by phone, paid a total of £2,330,468.75 including the buyer's premium and VAT. The outcome aroused controversy and prompted calls for the Treasure Act to be revised, though British Archaeology noted that the circumstances of the helmet's discovery may have resulted in it being outside the scope of even a revised act. It is still possible that the helmet could come into public ownership; if the winning bidder wishes to export it, an export licence would have to be applied for and if a temporary export bar was placed on it an opportunity could arise for funds to be raised by a public institution to purchase the helmet.

== Display ==
Since its sale in 2010, the helmet has been on public display four times. It was lent by its owner to the Royal Academy of Arts in London, and was put on display from 15 September to 9 December 2012 as part of an exhibition of bronzes. From 1 November 2013 until 26 January 2014 the helmet was on display at the Tullie House Museum and Art Gallery in Carlisle, and a printed guide was produced for the occasion. It was subsequently displayed at the British Museum from 28 January to 27 April 2014. The helmet returned to Tullie House to be part of their exhibition for Hadrian's Cavalry, an exhibition spanning ten sites along Hadrian's Wall from April to September 2017.
