= Hallaton Treasure =

Hoard of British Iron Age coins

Coordinates: 52.5563°N 0.8509°W

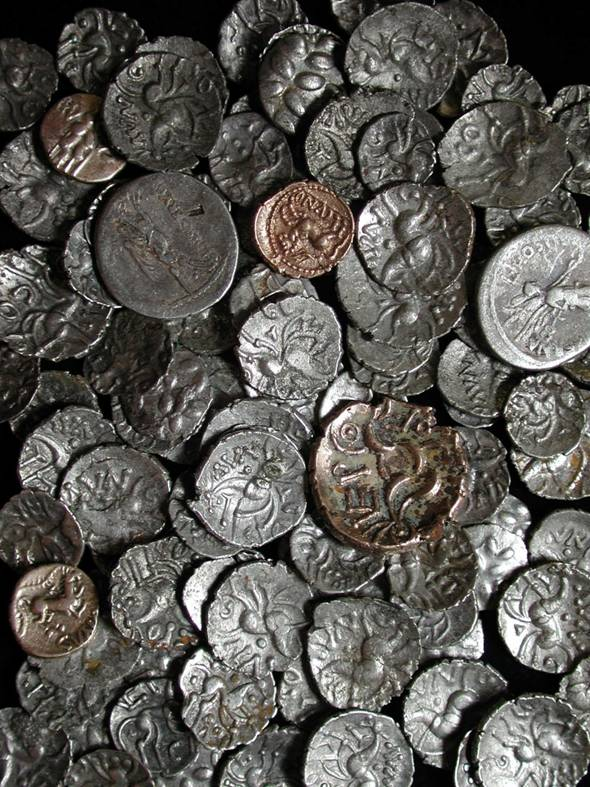
Iron Age coins from the Hallaton Treasure

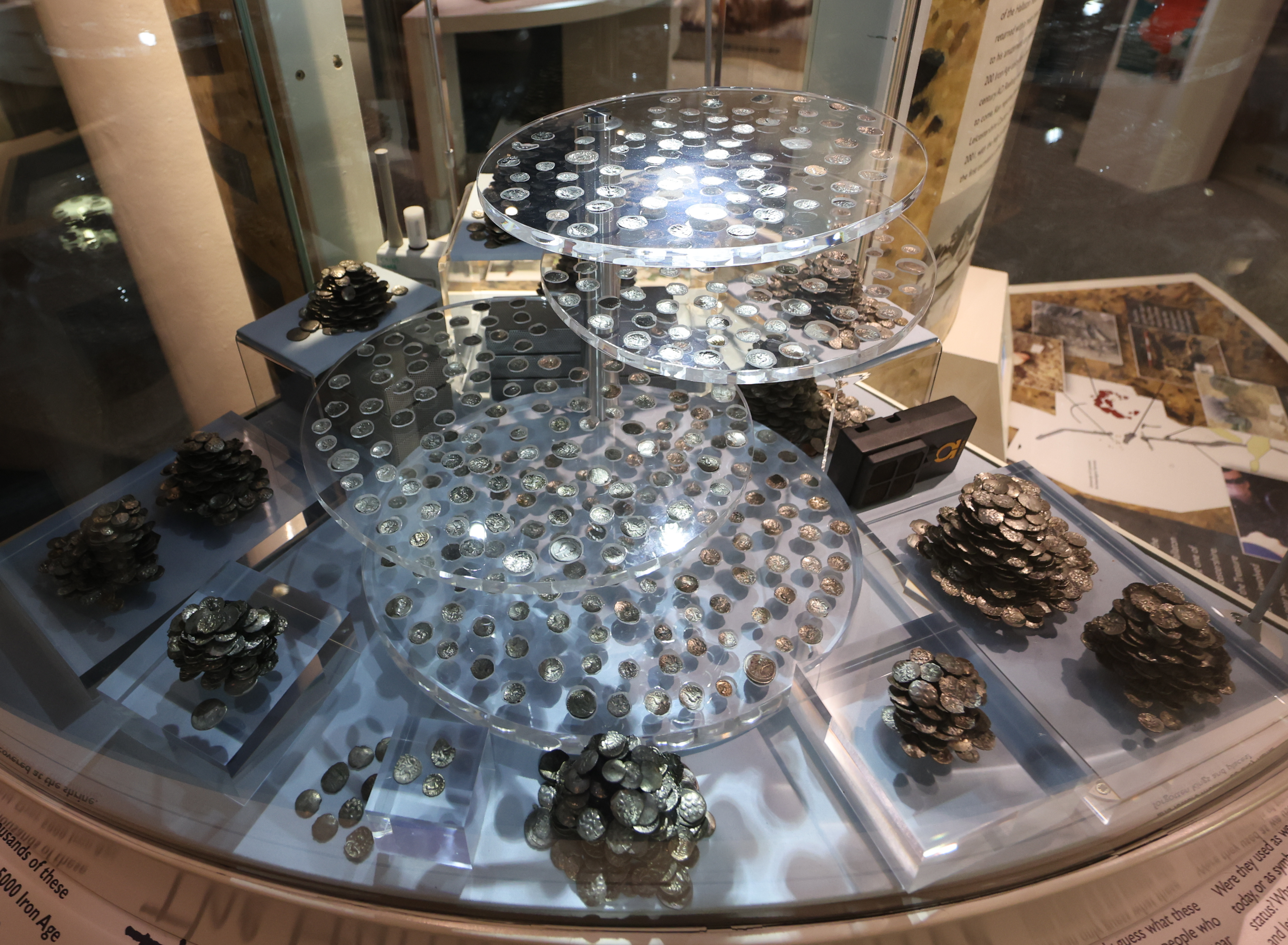
Hallaton Treasure on display at the Harborough Museum

The Hallaton Treasure, the largest hoard of British Iron Age coins, was discovered in 2000 near Hallaton in southeast Leicestershire, England, by volunteers from the Hallaton Fieldwork Group. The initial find was made by Ken Wallace on 19 November 2000, when he found about 130 coins with a metal detector.

Along with local community archaeologists, the University of Leicester Archaeological Services (ULAS) excavated what turned out to be one of the most important Iron Age excavations and community archaeology projects in Britain.

The hoard includes over 5,000 silver and gold coins, a silver-gilt Roman parade helmet, jewellery, and other objects. Most of the items date to around the time of the Roman conquest of Britain in the 1st century AD. Of the coins from the site, 4,835 can be attributed to the local Celtic tribe, the Corieltauvi. This find more than doubled the total number of Corieltauvian coins already recorded. A silver Roman coin from the hoard has been dated by local museums to 211 BC, and is the oldest Roman coin found in Britain.

Some archaeologists have however speculated that it found its way into Britain before the Roman conquest in 43 AD and is evidence of exchange through trade or diplomacy. The site of the treasure proved to be an internationally important ritual site dating mostly to the generations before and after the Roman conquest. Archaeologists believe that the site is a type of open-air shrine that is the first of its kind to have been discovered in the UK. It was located on a hilltop in the Welland valley and was probably enclosed by a ditch and palisade.

According to Professor David Mattingly, an archaeologist with the University of Leicester, "This hoard has changed our view of just how significant the East Midlands were in this period and this coin is a good example. It indicates there was contact between this region and the Roman Empire despite the distance between the East Midlands and the parts of Britain the Romans arrived in, like Colchester and Chichester."

Finds from the Treasure are displayed at Harborough Museum. The Roman Hallaton Helmet underwent nine years of conservation at the British Museum and went on display at Harborough Museum in 2012.

In January 2011 it was announced that the skeleton of a dog, believed to have been sacrificed to guard the treasure, would also be displayed at Harborough Museum.

In 2012 a silver ring inscribed "TOT" was found in the area that the Hallaton Treasure was discovered. The inscription is believed to refer to the Celtic god Toutatis, corresponding to the Roman god Mars, who Adam Daubney, an expert on this type of ring, suggests may have been worshipped at Hallaton. Leicestershire County Council have acquired the ring for display at the Harborough Museum.

== See also ==
- List of hoards in Great Britain
