= Harborough Museum =

Museum in Leicestershire, England

Coordinates: 52°28′43.25″N 0°55′14.43″W

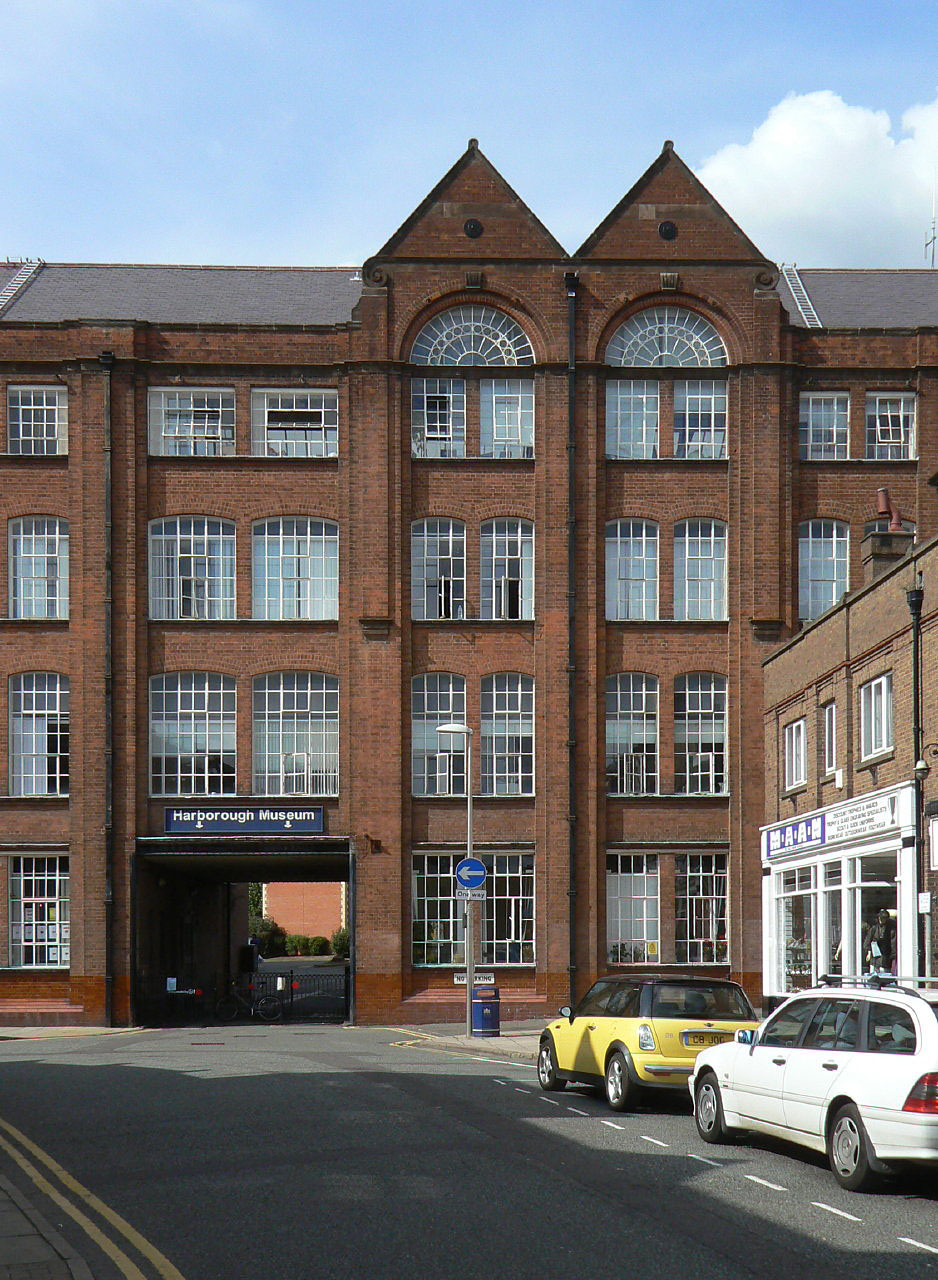
Harborough Museum

Harborough Museum was opened in 1983 in the former R & W H Symington corset factory that also houses the Harborough District Council offices in the historic market town of Market Harborough. It is run by a partnership between Leicestershire County Council, Harborough District Council and Market Harborough Historical Society. Since 2014, its affairs have been overseen by a new charitable organisation, the Harborough Museum Trust.

The museum celebrates Market Harborough's history as a historic market town and centre of industry and trade between Leicestershire and Northamptonshire, and collects artefacts from S E Leicestershire and N Northants.

Regular displays include Symington corsets, including the world-famous liberty bodice, Symington Soups, Table Creams and Pea Flour, the Harboro Rubber Company, Falkner's Boot and Shoe Making Workshop, an 18th-century long case clock made in Harborough, 17th-century toys found in the local church, local archaeology finds and many temporary displays.

The museum is accredited by the Museums, Libraries and Archives Council (MLA).

== Museum developments ==
Harborough Museum reopened in April 2014 after a year when the building was refurbished by the district council. Many improvements were made and the museum now occupies the first floor of the building together with the library as an integrated space. The displays are much improved, thanks to a generous grant from the Market Harborough and Bowdens Charity. One of the most significant Iron Age finds in Britain, the Hallaton Treasure, is the focal point of the displays. This project included purchasing and conserving the finds, displays at Harborough Museum and at Hallaton Museum, two touring exhibitions, web-based resources, workshops for schools and community groups, and events for the public.

This installation in 2009 was funded with grants from the Heritage Lottery Fund, The Art Fund, The Headley Trust, Renaissance East Midlands and local contributions from the Friends of Leicester and Leicestershire Museums, the Leicestershire Museums Archaeological Fieldwork Group, Leicestershire County Council and the Department of Culture, Media and Sport among others.

The treasure was discovered near Hallaton in the Welland Valley in 2000 by local community archaeologists and the University of Leicester Archaeological Services. The treasure hoard includes over 5000 silver and gold coins, a silver gilt Roman helmet, jewellery and many other objects. Most of the items date to around the time of the Roman conquest of Britain. The site of the treasure proved to be an internationally important ritual site dating mostly to the generations before and after the Roman conquest of Britain in the 1st century AD.

The Hallaton Helmet underwent conservation and research for about ten years at the British Museum and has been exhibited at the Harborough Museum since January 2012. Also in the find was a silver cup, thought to be the earliest example of its type made in Britain.

Other displays are in themed exhibition cases and include a selection from a unique hoard of more than 200 seventeenth-century toys found behind a bricked-up stairwell in St. Dionysius Church in the centre of Market Harborough. The toys include whip-tops, tip-cats, small balls and sap whistles, and were made from wood, pig's knuckle bones and fabrics, all easily obtainable materials to children who had to make their own toys long before such things were mass-produced. The Market Harborough Historical Society's collection is also displayed.
