= Guisborough Helmet =

Roman cavalry bronze helmet found in 1864

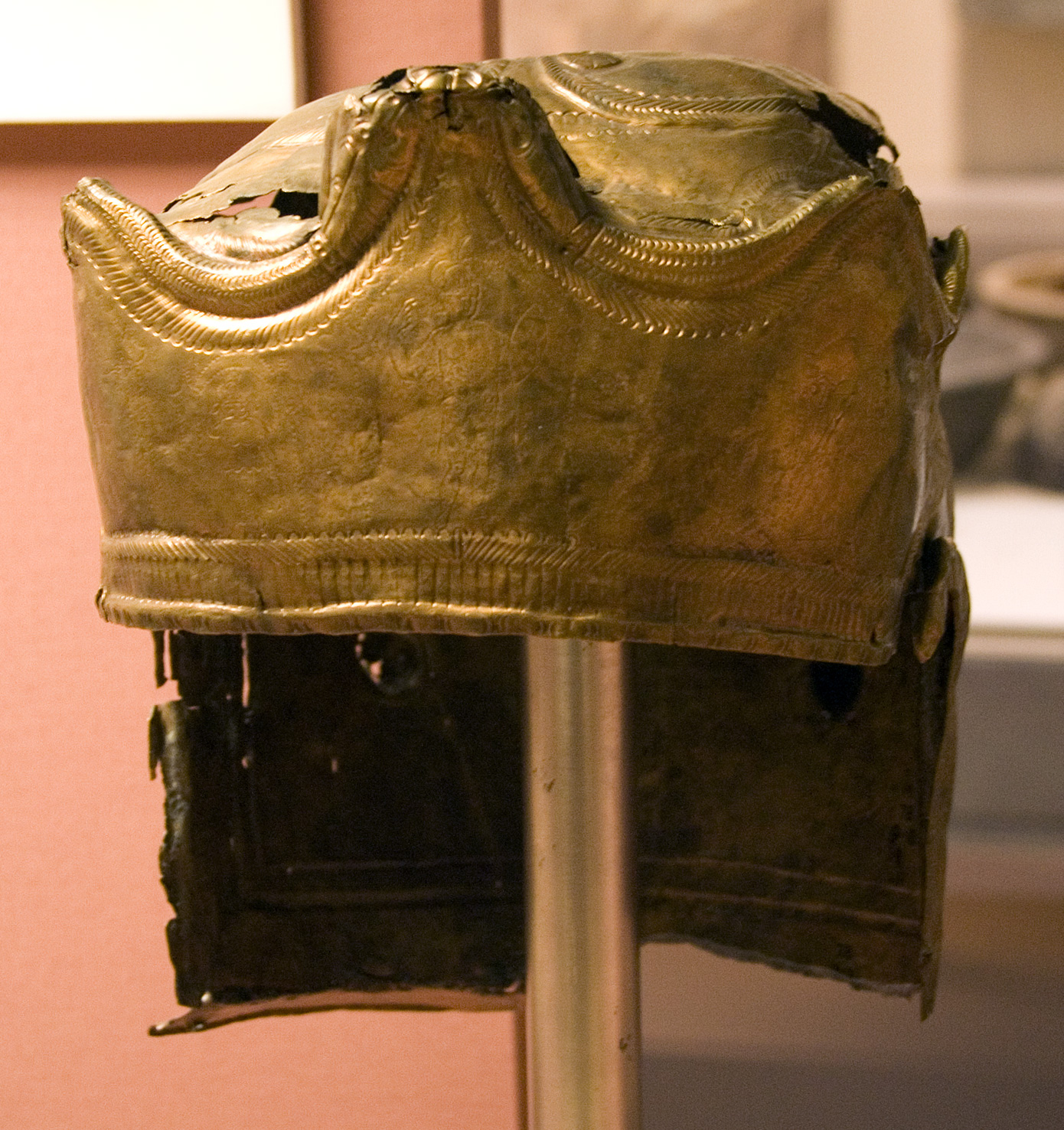
- The Guisborough Helmet
- Material: Bronze (copper alloy)
- Size: 240 millimetres (9.4 in) high
- Created: 3rd century AD
- Period/culture: Roman Empire
- Discovered: By workers employed by the Cleveland Railway Company in 1864
- Place: Guisborough, North Yorkshire
- Present location: Room 49, British Museum, London
- Identification: P&EE 1878 9-10 1
- Registration: 1878,0910.1

The Guisborough Helmet is a Roman cavalry bronze helmet found in 1864 near Guisborough in the North Riding of Yorkshire, England. It was originally fitted with a pair of protective cheek-pieces, which have not survived; the holes by which they were attached can be seen in front of the helmet's ear guards. It is lavishly decorated with incised, punched and embossed figures, indicating that it was probably used for displays or cavalry tournaments, though it may well have been intended to be worn in battle as well. The helmet was found in what appears to have been a carefully arranged deposition in a bed of gravel, distant from any known Roman sites. After it was recovered during road works it was donated to the British Museum in London, where it was restored and is currently on display.

== Design and origins ==
The helmet was made from bronze, a copper alloy, in the 3rd century AD. Its brow band is engraved and embossed with representations of shrines (aediculae) housing the deities Victory, Mars and Minerva, all of whom were associated with war. Prancing horsemen are depicted between the figures. The brow band has three diadem-like peaks bordered by writhing snakes whose heads meet at the centre, forming an arch above the central figure of Mars. Two bosses stand out at the rear of the helmet, at the centre of embossed flowers. The sides and top of the helmet are embossed with feathers and a feather-like pattern. The design is similar to others found in Worthing, Norfolk and Chalon-sur-Saône in France. Despite its relative thinness and lavish decoration, it is thought that such helmets would have been used in battle as well as in parades or hippika gymnasia (cavalry tournaments).

The helmet remains something of an enigma. It was buried in a compressed and folded state in complete isolation from any other objects of the same period and at some remove from any known Roman sites; how and why it came to be deposited remains unknown. There is no closely associated fort or fortress in the vicinity. However, the Dutch historian Johan Nicolay has identified a "lifecycle" for Roman military equipment in which ex-soldiers took items home with them as a reminder of their service and occasionally disposed of them away from garrison sites, for instance by votive deposition or burial with the dead. Another Roman cavalry helmet, known as the Crosby Garrett Helmet, was discovered in Cumbria in May 2010 in a broadly similar context – away from any known settlements but folded before burial – suggesting that it may have been a votive offering or loot that had been hidden for safe-keeping.

== Discovery and restoration ==
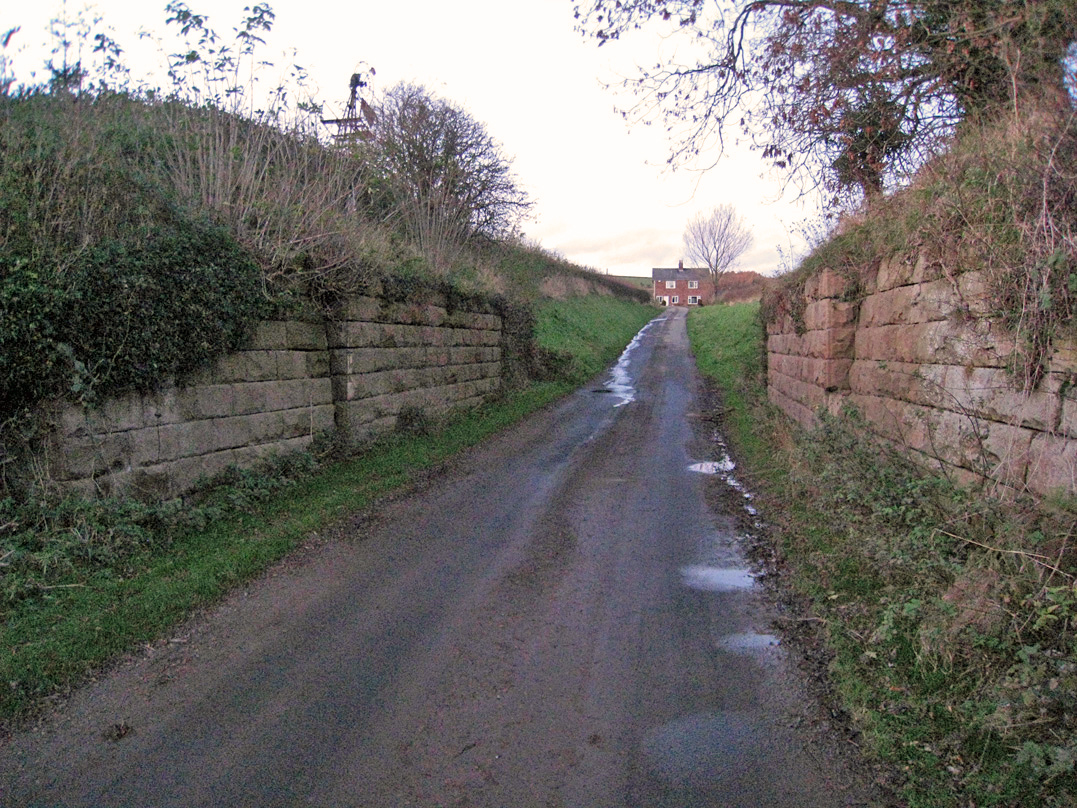
The Guisborough Helmet was found at this spot during the construction of a road leading under the Cleveland Railway's now-demolished line, of which the abutments can still be seen

The helmet was discovered on 19 August 1864 at Barnaby Grange Farm, about 2 miles west of Guisborough town centre. It was found buried deep in a bed of gravel during road works carried out for the Cleveland Railway Company. John Christopher Atkinson described the circumstances of its discovery in an article for The Gentleman's Magazine in September 1864:

A short time since it was found expedient to supersede the existing accommodation-road to Barnaby Grange Farm, which crosses the Cleveland Railway on the level, by a new one carried beneath the line. While prosecuting the necessary excavation, and after reaching a depth of a few feet, a variety of [animal] bones, most of them in exceedingly good preservation, and with an abundance of earthy phosphate of iron investing them, were dug upon. These were carefully collected, and have now accumulated to a mass of considerable extent ... But the most remarkable of the non-osseus matters was a folded and doubled metal plate, embossed and engraved.

No other artefacts were found at the site and the bones appeared to have no connection with the helmet. They had apparently been deposited naturally by the prehistoric stream that had laid down the gravel bed. Atkinson noted that the artefact was in a strikingly good condition despite its obvious antiquity and the damage done to it:

Apart from the folding and doubling to which it has been subjected, it is in remarkably good preservation. It is scarcely corroded in any perceptible degree in any visible part, but is as bright as on the day it was consigned to its place of concealment. Neither is it bruised or dented, except where the workman's pick happened to strike; indeed, it is not even scratched.

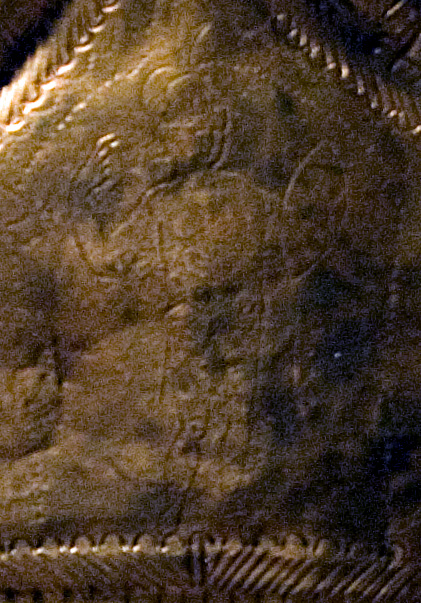
Detail of the figure of Mars on the front of the helmet

He commented that the find appeared to have been "deliberately buried in a hole dug for the purpose, just where it was found; and the unbattered, and even unscratched condition of its entire visible surface seems amply to confirm the inference." Its crushed condition meant that it was not initially recognisable as a helmet, though its ornamentation was clearly visible. Atkinson described the outer decoration:

The chief ornamentation seems to depend on the effigies of two snakes in strong relief and wrought hollow, with their heads meeting ... The bodies of the snakes slightly descending thence, and diverging, seem then to have taken an upward direction so as to enclose or enfold the central portion of the plate. But these details cannot be ascertained so long as the object remains in its present condition. Besides the snakes, on which the scales are represented by regular series of curved lines carefully engraved, several raised boss-like projections, which themselves, as well as the plate around their bases, are rather elaborately chased or engraved, are observable; and the outlines of certain figures, apparently armed in a fashion rather resembling a Greek soldier's defensive equipment, are visible on another part of the surface. Besides these figures and ornaments, other minor ornamental engravings are worked in here and there.

It was at first incorrectly identified as a breastplate of unknown origin (Atkinson thought it to be of "Oriental workmanship") and age. Thomas Richmond, a local historian, erroneously assigned it in 1868 to "a late Celtic, or early Anglo-Saxon period".

In 1878, Frederick B. Greenwood, who owned the land on which the helmet had been found, presented it to the British Museum. It was restored at the museum by Robert Cooper Ready, resulting in the discovery that it was in fact a Roman helmet. It is currently on display in the British Museum's Roman Britain section in Room 49. Similar helmets have been found elsewhere in Europe; the closest continental parallel is a helmet found in the River Saône at Chalon-sur-Saône in France in the 1860s. The Guisborough Helmet represents a distinct form of cavalry helmet, dubbed the "Guisborough type", which can be distinguished by three peaked scallops on the brow band.

== See also ==
- Hallaton Helmet
- Yarm helmet
- York helmet
