= Valkhof Museum =

Archaeology and art museum in Nijmegen, Netherlands

Museum Het Valkhof
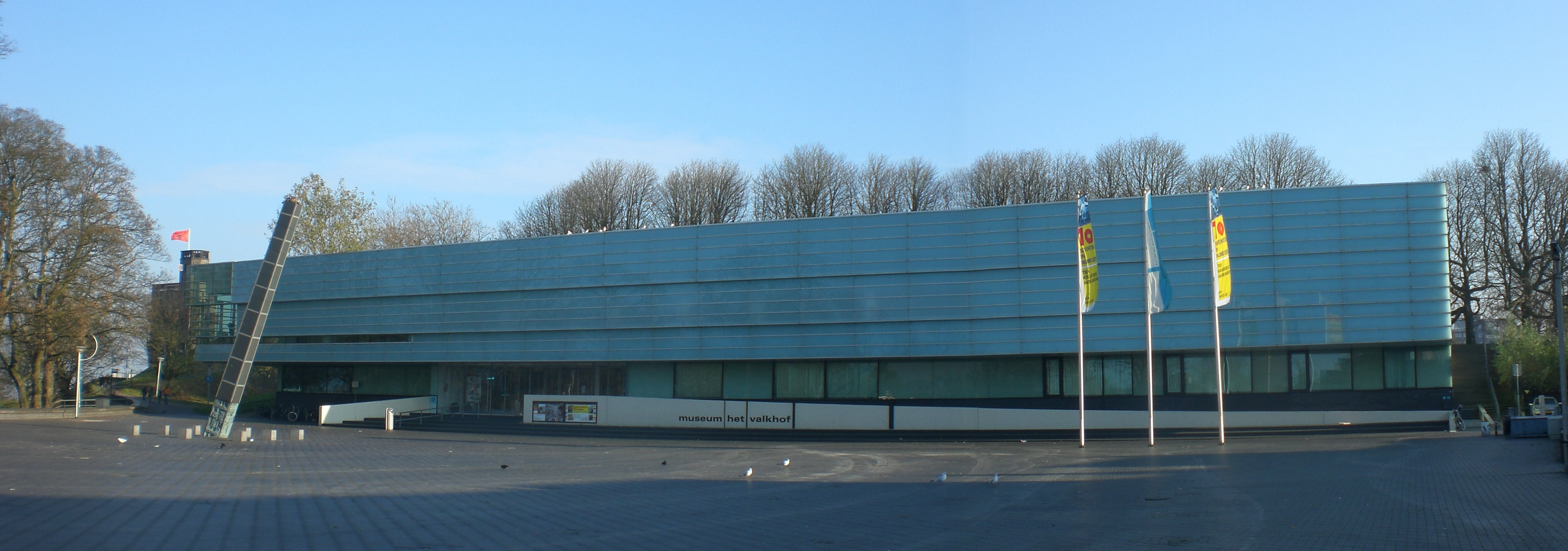
- The museum in 2007

- Location in Gelderland in the Netherlands
- Established: 1999
- Location: Kelfkensbos 59; Nijmegen, Netherlands
- Coordinates: 51.846°N 5.871°E
- Visitors: 95,653 (2013)
- Director: Marijke Brouwer
- Website: www.museumhetvalkhof.nl

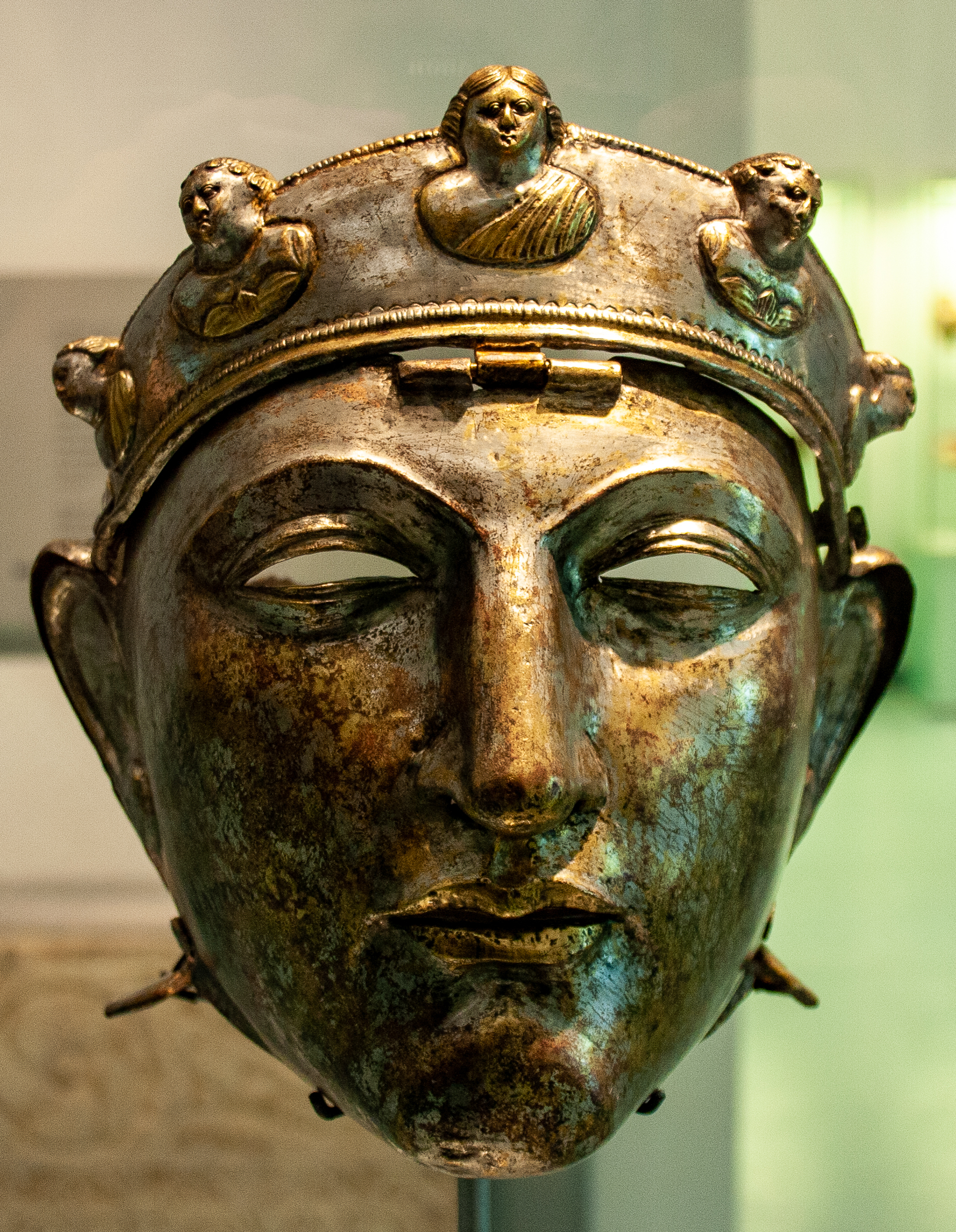
Nijmegen helmet, helmet of a Roman horseman from the 1st or 2nd century

The Valkhof Museum (Dutch: Museum Het Valkhof) is an archaeology and art museum in Nijmegen, Netherlands.

The museum has existed since 1999, created as a merger between the G. M. Kam museum of archaeology and the Commanderie van St. Jan museum of classical and modern art. The museum's collection includes a large and important collection of local Roman archaeological finds and art (mostly modern).

The museum stands on the edge of the Valkhof park, site of a Roman army camp and a citadel built by Charlemagne. The museum's building was designed by Dutch architect Ben van Berkel and was opened on 14 September 1999 by Queen Beatrix.

In November 2008, the official name of the museum was changed to Valkhof-Kam. This reflected an agreement reached with the heirs of G. M. Kam.

== See also ==
- Bergakker inscription
- Nijmegen Helmet
