= Hippika gymnasia =

Tournaments performed by the cavalry of the Roman Empire

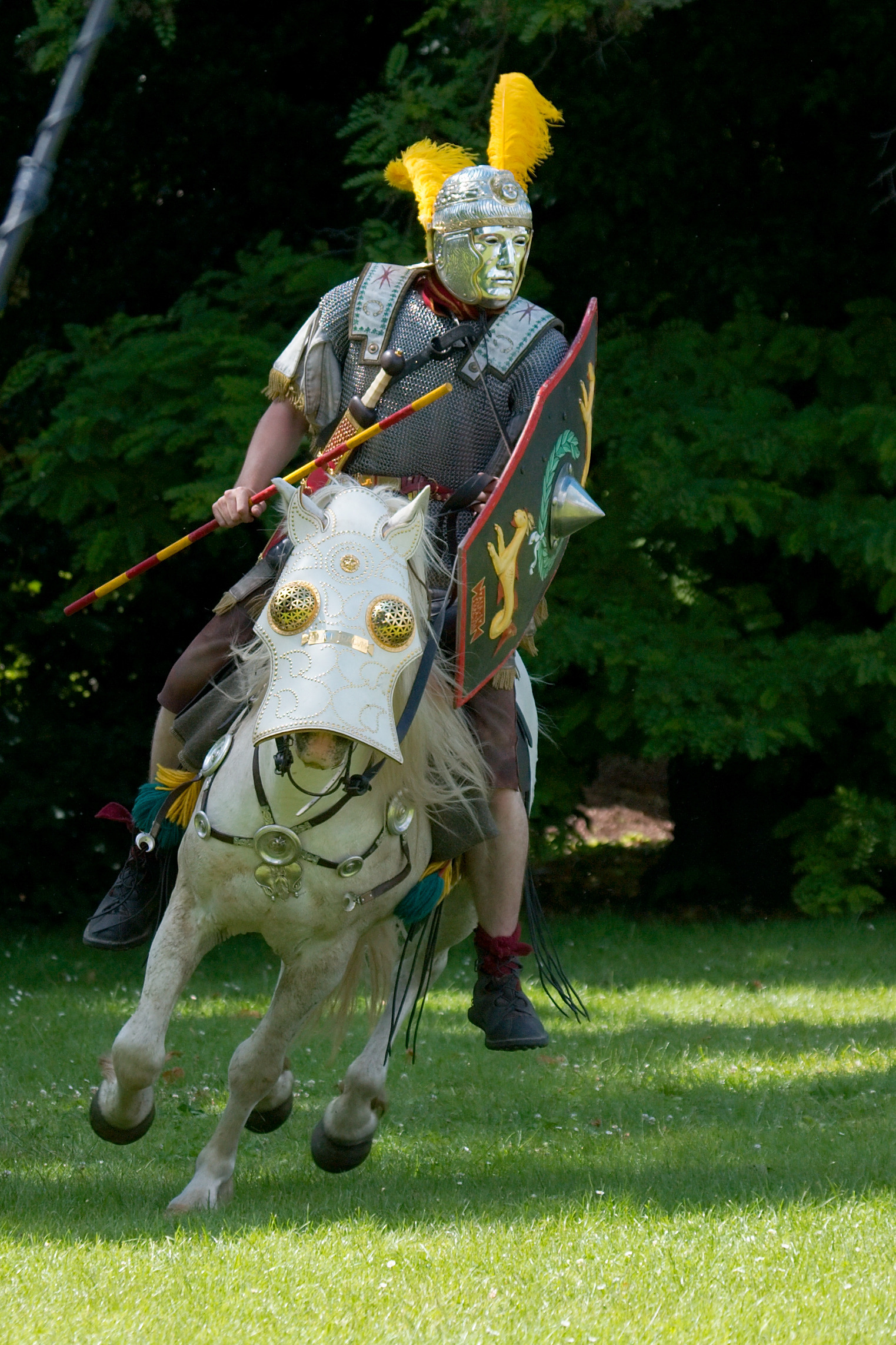
A reenactor and horse wearing pieces of display armour typical of the hippika gymnasia

The hippika gymnasia (Greek: ἱππικὰ γυμνάσια, "horse exercises") were ritual tournaments performed by the cavalry of the Roman Empire to both practice their skills and display their expertise. They took place on a parade ground situated outside a fort and involved the cavalry practicing manoeuvring and the handling of weapons such as javelins and spears. The riders and their mounts wore highly elaborate armour and helmets specially made for display purposes, decorated with images from classical mythology. Such tournaments served several purposes, improving the riders' skills, helping to build unit morale and impressing dignitaries and conquered peoples.

The Romans maintained substantial cavalry forces to support their legions. The elite of the cavalry, the alae, were expected to perform complex manoeuvres that required extensive training. The role of the cavalry was described in the 2nd century AD by the Roman writer Arrian in his Ars Tactica, a (possibly theoretical) work in which he described how the legions and auxiliary troops could be organised to defeat an enemy. He recorded the hippika gymnasia in considerable detail, though – as he was writing in Greek – we do not know the Latin name of such events. The riders practised complex manoeuvres with dummy weapons, alternately attacking and defending, and displaying their horsemanship and courage to onlookers.

== Clothing and armour ==
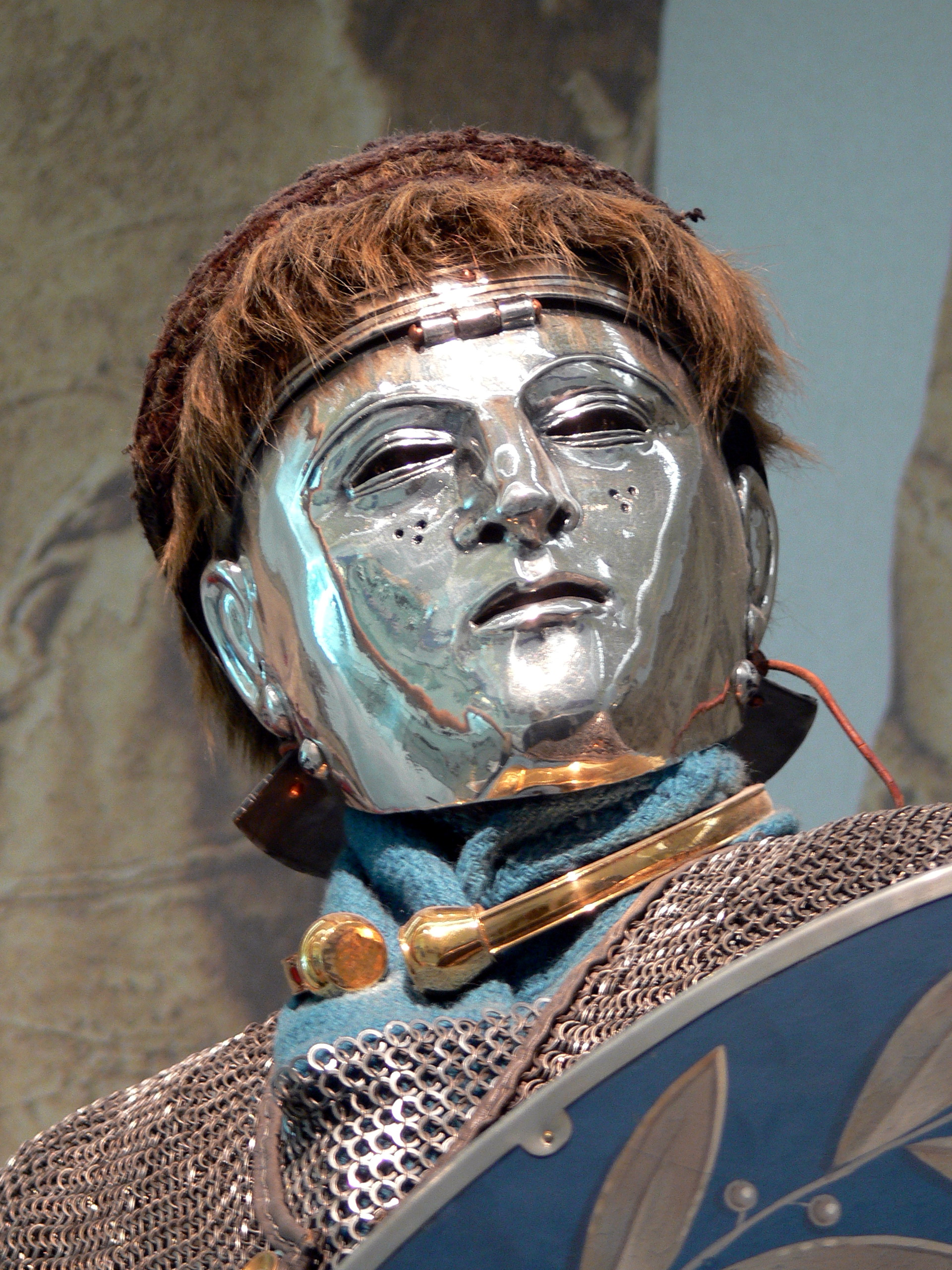
Reconstruction of a Roman cavalry "sports helmet" of the 2nd century AD

The participants in the hippika gymnasia would have been an impressive sight for those who saw them; as one writer has put it, "a cavalcade of richly armoured horses and men – who in their masked helmets with silvered faces looked like divine beings." The riders wore brightly coloured tunics – which seems to have evolved into decorated bronze armour by the 3rd century – and very ornate greaves and helmets with face masks. As Arrian described them,

The horsemen enter [the parade ground] fully armed, and those of high rank or superior in horsemanship wear gilded helmets of iron or bronze to draw the attention of the spectators. Unlike the helmets made for active service, these do not cover the head and cheeks only but are made to fit all round the faces of the riders with apertures for the eyes . . . From the helmets hang yellow plumes, a matter of décor as much as utility. As the horses move forward, the slightest breeze adds to the beauty of these plumes. They carry oblong shields of a lighter type than those used in action, since both agility and smart turnout are the objects of the exercise and they improve the appearance of their shields by embellishment. Instead of breastplates the horsemen wear close-fitting Cimmerian tunics [leather jerkins] embroidered with scarlet, red or blue and other colours. On their legs they wear tight trousers, not loosely fitting like those of the Parthians and Armenians. The horses have frontlets carefully made to measure and also have side armour.

Substantial archaeological evidence has been found of such "sports equipment", as it has been dubbed. A hoard of cavalry display armour dating to the 3rd century AD was discovered at Straubing in Bavaria in 1950. It included extraordinarily elaborate horse armour, greaves, helmets and other pieces of armour. Many more "sports helmets" have been recovered from other locations. They were made from a variety of metals and alloys, often from gold-coloured alloys or iron covered with tin. They were decorated with embossed reliefs and engravings depicting the war god Mars and other divine and semi-divine figures associated with the military. One of the Newstead Helmets from Scotland, for instance, is embossed with a naked winged figure of Cupid driving a chariot.

The helmets were of both "male" and "female" types, portraying the wearers as Greeks or Amazons. These were apparently commonly competing teams in the hippika gymnasia, which may also have involved re-enactments of other scenes from classical tradition. The female helmets can be recognised by their sculpted hairstyles and other distinctively female elements such as diadems, ribbons and jewels. They were often equipped with the full-face masks mentioned by Arrian in his account. The faces depicted were not always those of Romans, as some were clearly intended to portray easterners.

The origin of these very elaborate helmets is uncertain but appears not to have been Rome. Various origins have been suggested, including a theory that they came from Rome's eastern provinces. They were produced from the early 1st century AD through to the mid-3rd century. Although they are relatively light, they appear to have been worn in battle as well as for display purposes. One such helmet was found at the site of the Battle of the Teutoburg Forest, where three Roman legions were wiped out by Germans in 9 AD. It was perhaps worn by an officer or standard-bearer who intended its imposing appearance to intimidate his enemies on the battlefield.

Roman cavalry "sports helmets" from Britain
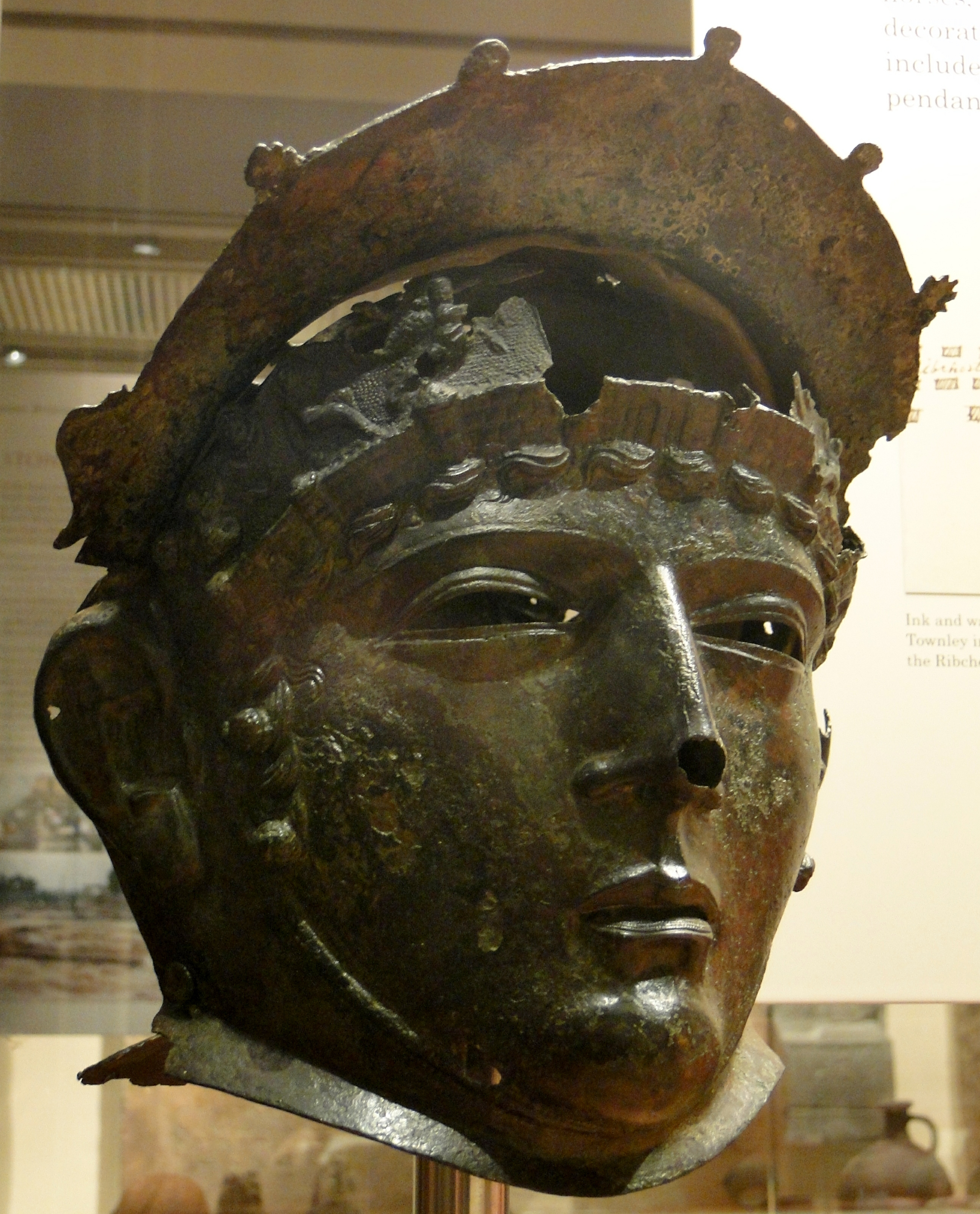
The Ribchester Helmet

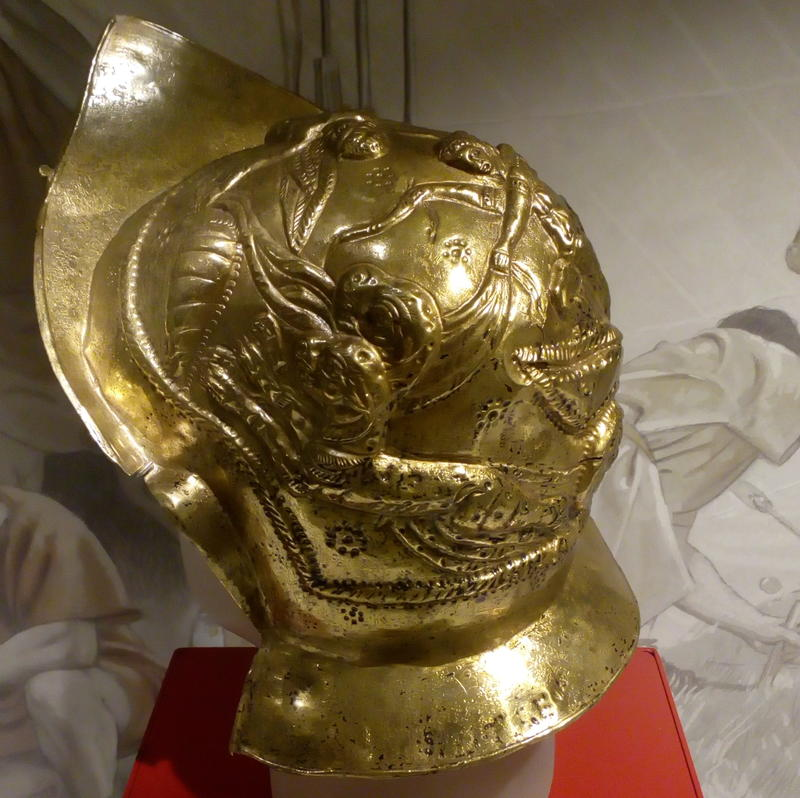
One of the Newstead Helmets

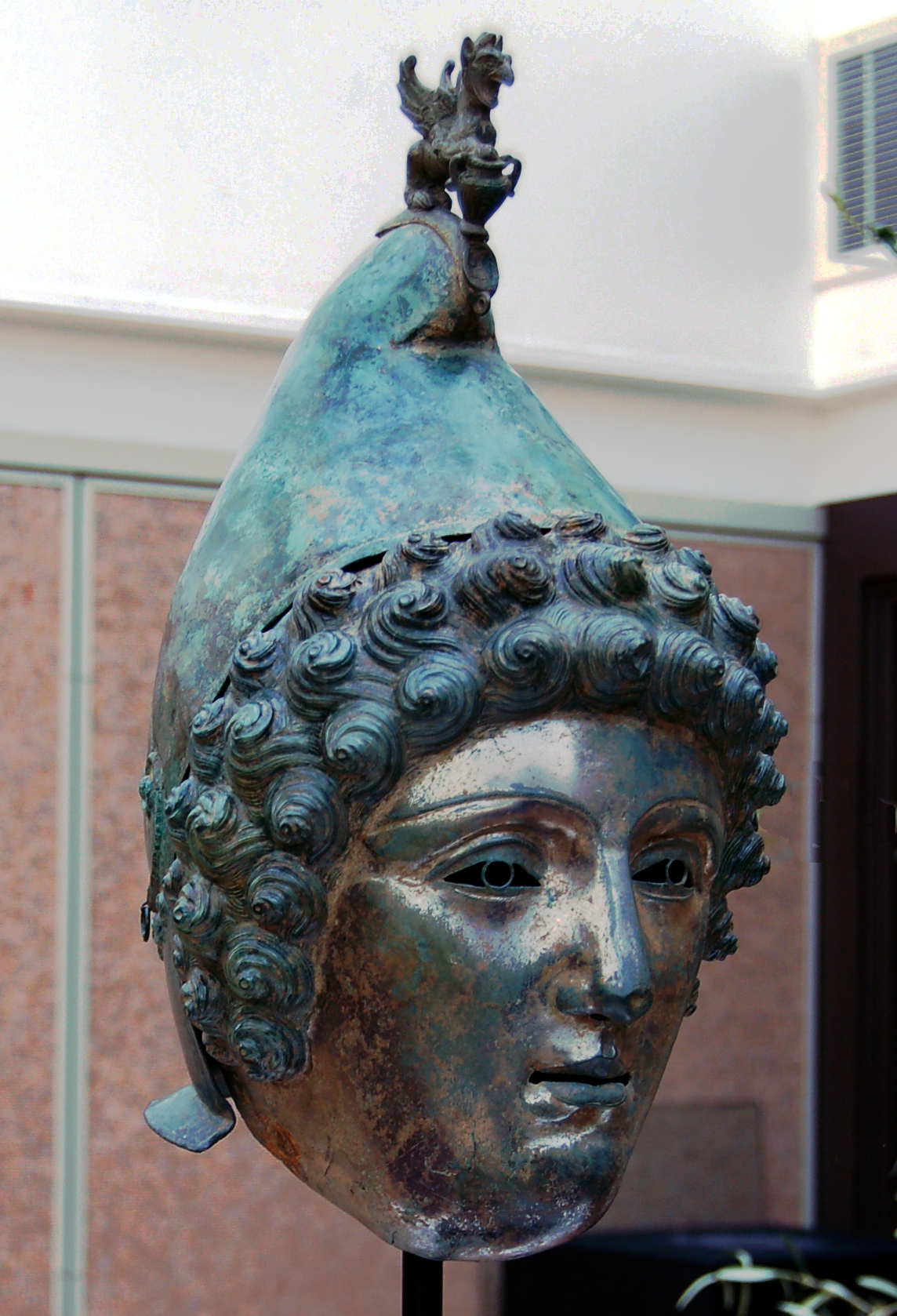
The Crosby Garrett Helmet

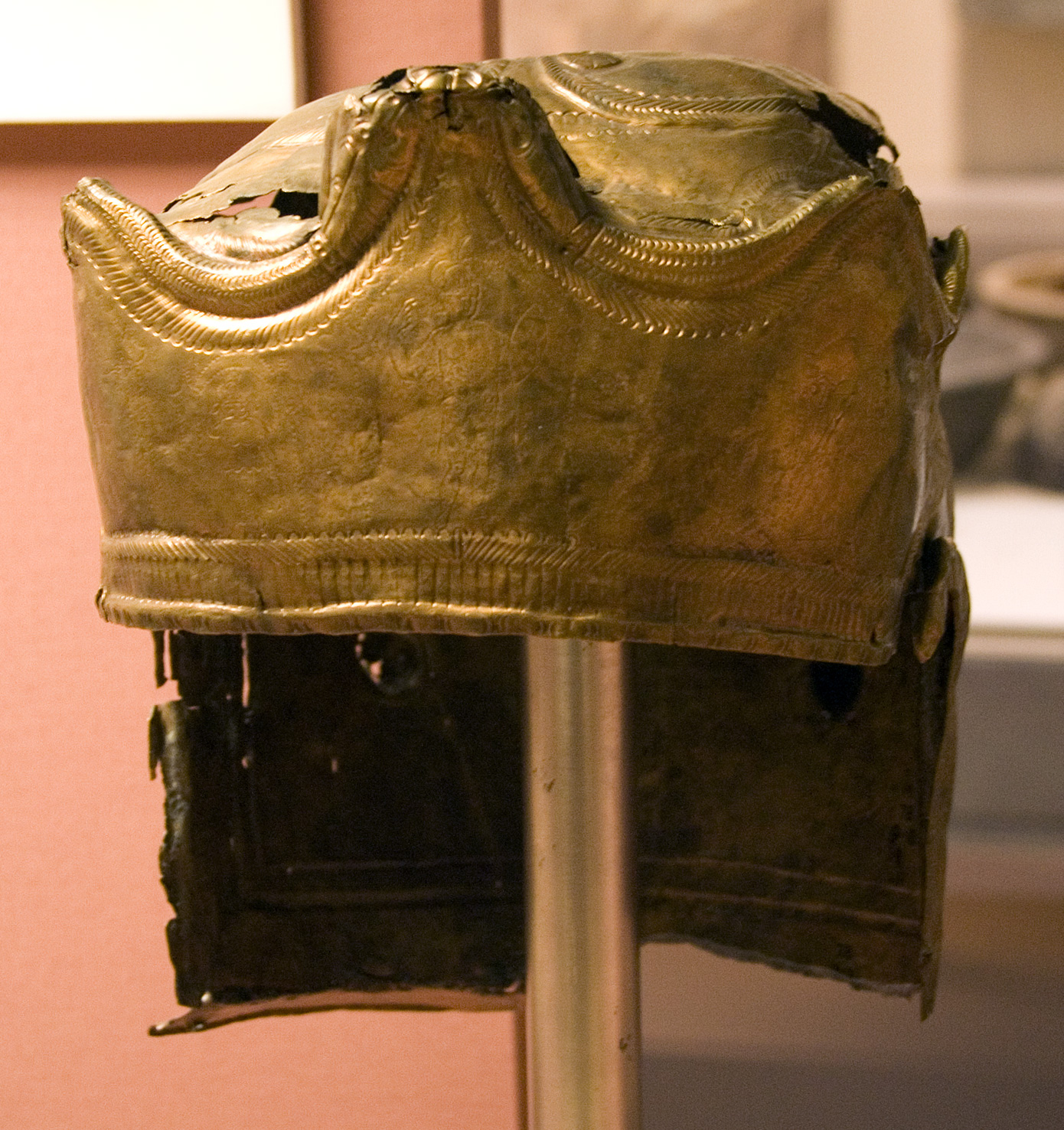
The Guisborough Helmet

Arrian's account makes it clear that the horses were also armoured to protect them from javelins and other weapons used during the hippika gymnasia: "[the javelins] fall harmlessly on [the horses'] sides, particularly since the sides are for the most part protected by the horses' armour." Examples of Roman scale armour for horses have been found at Dura-Europos in Syria. It is possible that cloth or linen horse armour may also have been used, which would have been in keeping with the tunics worn by the riders. Arrian also describes the horses as wearing frontlets or head armour, of which examples were found at the Roman fort of Trimontium (Newstead) in Scotland.

== Weapons and exercises ==
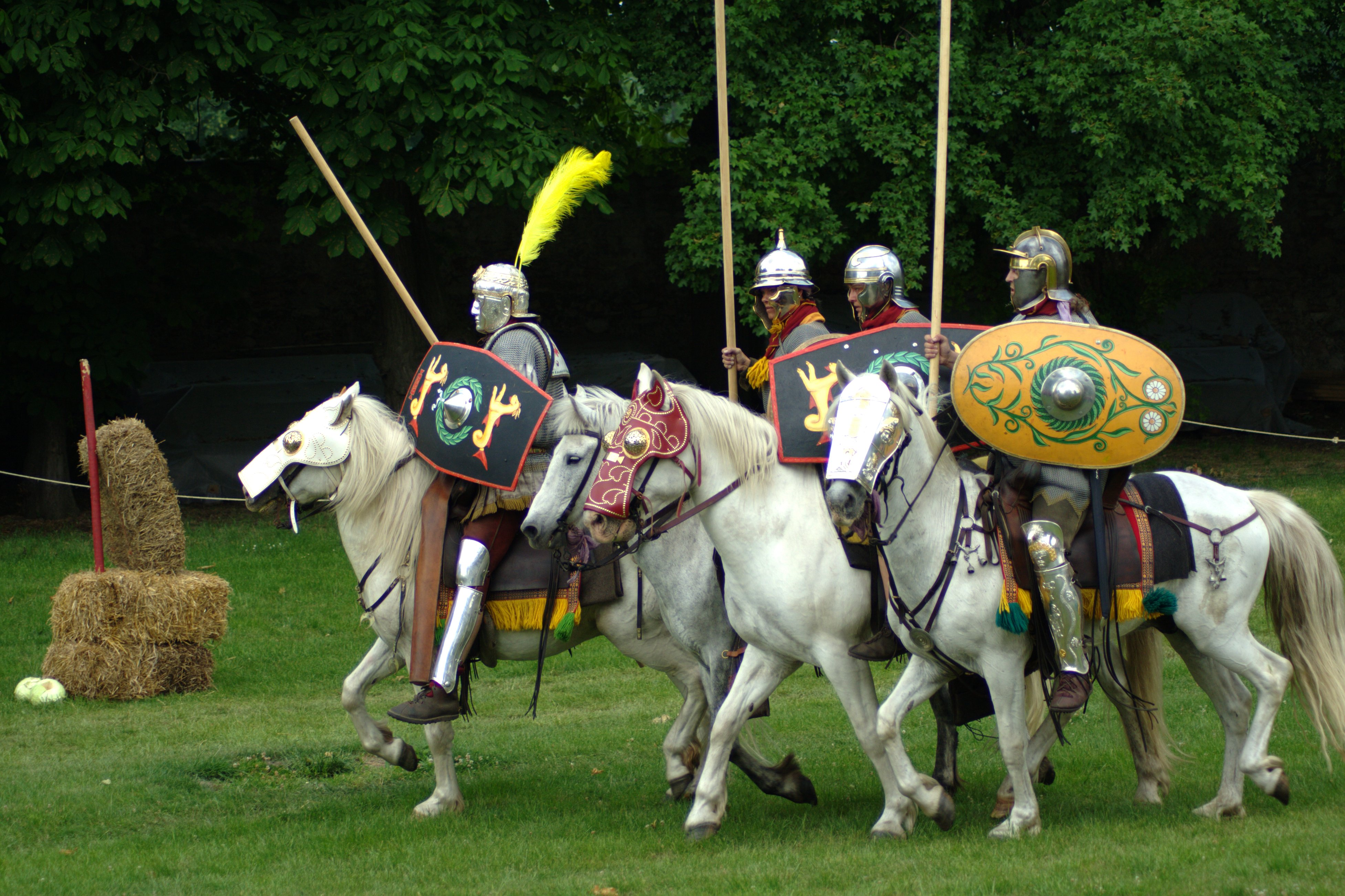
Reenactment of the hippika gymnasia at Carnuntum, Austria

The riders in the hippika gymnasia were armed with dummy javelins and darts that they employed in mock battles. According to Arrian, the riders would divide into two teams, one of which would be the attacking side and one the defenders. They used their shields to cover their own and their horses' backs, forming a type of mobile testudo. Two of the defenders would stand in front of their team, acting as targets for the throws of the other side. The attackers were tested on their accuracy in hitting the two defenders, who in turn would attempt to protect themselves with their shields. Some of the other defenders would ride out and try to hit the passing attackers. This was a challenging exercise, as Arrian noted:

It is at this point that good horsemanship is especially needed to be able simultaneously to throw at those who are charging in and to give one's right hand side the protection of the shield. When riding parallel to his target, the rider must swivel himself to the right in order to throw; when making a complete about-turn, he must throw in the matter called, in the Gallic tongue petrinos, which is the most difficult of all. For he must turn right round as far as the tenderness of the sides will allow, to face the horse's tail, so as to throw backwards as straight as possible, and having done so, he must quickly turn forward again and bring his shield to cover his back, since if he turns without getting protection, he exposes a vulnerable target to the enemy.

In another exercise, the cavalry would attempt to throw as many darts as far as they could in a gallop across the parade area in front of the viewing platform where the commanders or other dignitaries were sitting. Fifteen was considered to be a good number but achieving a score of twenty was considered praiseworthy. They also undertook exercises in accurately striking targets with a lance: "Each man carries one lance, and before he gets near the platform, he must whirl his lance with all his might, and, as soon as it reverberates, throw it, taking aim at the target which has been set up . . . on the left of the platform."

The final stage of the display demonstrated skills that would evidently have been useful in combat, where the cavalry was given the task of chasing down the enemy and preventing him from regrouping. As Arrian puts it,

They advance first with pikes levelled in defensive style, then as though they were overtaking a fleeing enemy. Others, as if against another enemy, as their horses turn, swing their shields over their heads to a position behind them and turn their pikes as though meeting an enemy's assault. This manuoeuvre is called in Gallic toloutegon. Also they draw their swords and make a variety of strokes, best calculated to overtake an enemy in flight, to kill a man already down, or to achieve any success by a quick movement [along] from the flanks. Nor is this all: they demonstrate in as great a variety as possible, the number of shapes and forms which can be given to the act of leaping on a horse. Finally they demonstrate how a man wearing his armour can leap onto a horse when it is running. Some call this the 'wayfarer's jump'.

The emperor Hadrian witnessed one such display in North Africa in 118 and reviewed the performance of the riders. He complimented their prowess, telling them:

You did everything in orderly fashion. You filled the field with manoeuvres. Your javelin hurling was not without grace, although you used javelins which are short and stiff. Several of you hurled your lances equally well. And your mounting was smart just now and lively yesterday. If there were anything lacking I should notice it; if there were anything conspicuously bad, I should point it out. But you pleased me uniformly throughout the whole exercise . . .

== See also ==
- Cantabrian circle
- Lusus Troiae, the equestrian "Troy Game"
