= Newstead Helmet =

Iron Roman cavalry helmet dating to 80–100 AD, discovered in Scotland

Coordinates: 55.602°N 2.685°W

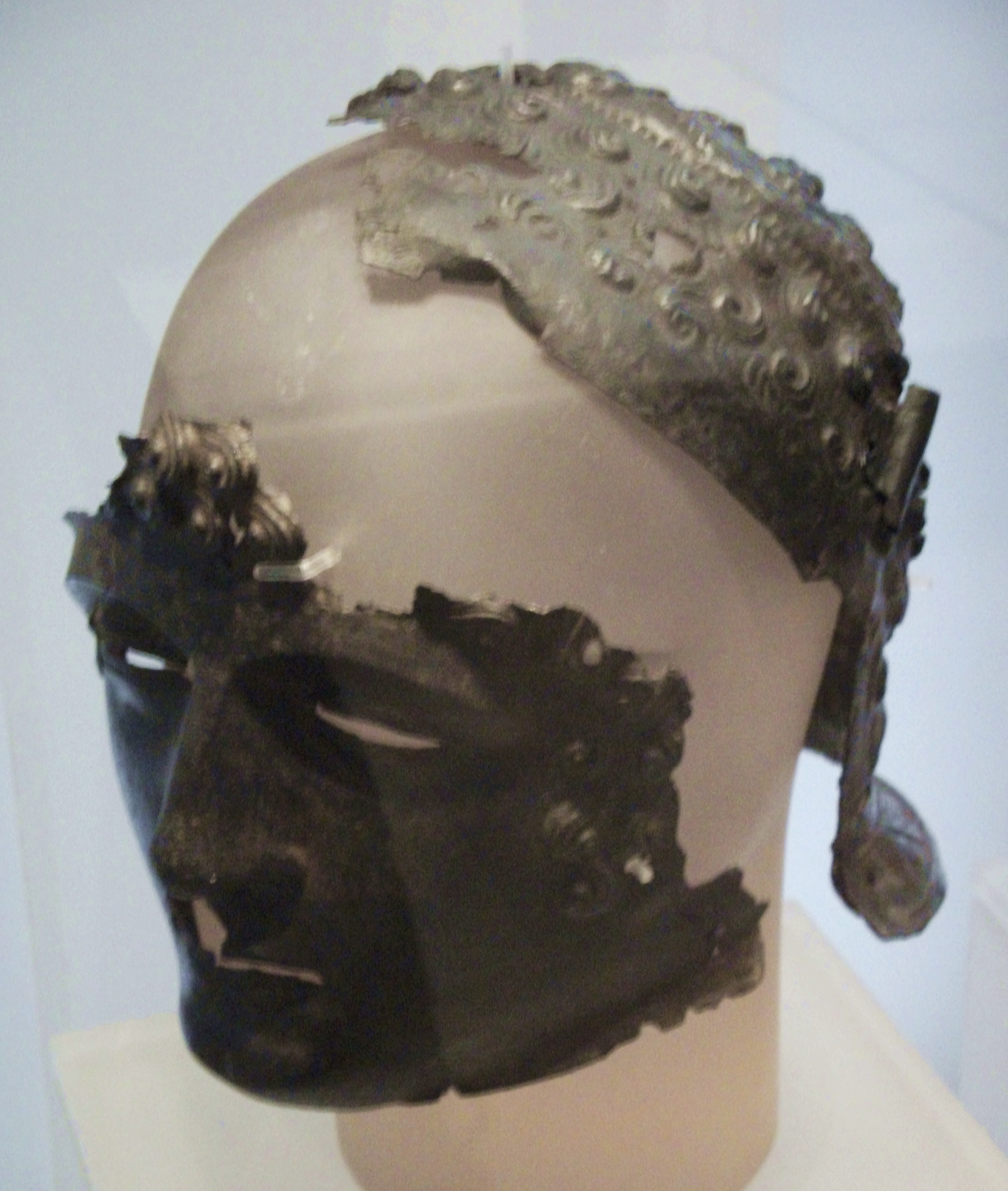
- The Newstead Helmet
- Material: Iron
- Created: Roman, 80–100 AD
- Place: Newstead, Roxburghshire
- Present location: National Museum of Scotland, Edinburgh
- Registration: X.FRA 121

The Newstead Helmet is an iron Roman cavalry helmet dating to 80–100 AD that was discovered at the site of a Roman fort in Newstead, near Melrose in Roxburghshire, Scotland in 1905. It is now part of the Newstead Collection at the National Museum in Edinburgh. The helmet would have been worn by auxiliary cavalrymen in cavalry displays known as hippika gymnasia. Its discoverer, Sir James Curle (1862–1944), described the helmet as "one of the most beautiful things that the receding tide of Roman conquest has left behind".

== Discovery ==
The helmet was discovered during excavations by James Curle during 1905 at the Roman fort of Trimontium, which is located near the triple peak of Eildon Hill at Newstead, after which the fort is named (Trimontium meaning "three hills"). During excavations between February 1905 and September 1910, Curle discovered a large number of Roman military artefacts at the fort, including items of Roman armour, horse harnesses, saddle plates, and several ornate bronze and iron cavalry helmets for parade use. Only one helmet, found in 1905, is largely complete and preserves the face mask, and is known as the "Newstead Helmet". This helmet was discovered in a pit dating to the Flavian period (69–96) in the south annexe of the fort.

== Description ==
The helmet is in two pieces, comprising a head-piece and a face mask, both of which are made of beaten iron. Prior to its discovery the helmet had been squashed by heavy stones, resulting in serious damage to parts of the helmet, including the destruction of most of the upper portion above the forehead, and the breaking in two of the mask. There is a rim at the back of the headpiece by the neck, to which is attached a thin bronze plate with an embossed chevron pattern, but this decoration is not as fine as elsewhere on the helmet. There are traces of silver or tin plating on the outer surface, and remnants of a woollen lining on the inner surface. The mask shows the face of a youth with curly hair held in a laurel wreath, which suggests a Celtic influence. On the left side of the head-piece is attached a tube that would have held ornamental plumes, as described by Arrian of Nicomedia:

The horsemen enter fully armed and those of distinguished station or superior in horsemanship wear gilded helmets of iron or bronze, to draw to themselves the gaze of the spectators. Unlike the helmets made for active service, these do not cover the heads and cheeks only but are made to fit round the faces of the riders with apertures for the eyes, so as to give protection to the eyes without interfering with vision. From the helmets hang yellow plumes — a matter of decor as much as of utility. As the horses move forward, the slightest breeze adds to the beauty of these plumes.

== Other helmets ==
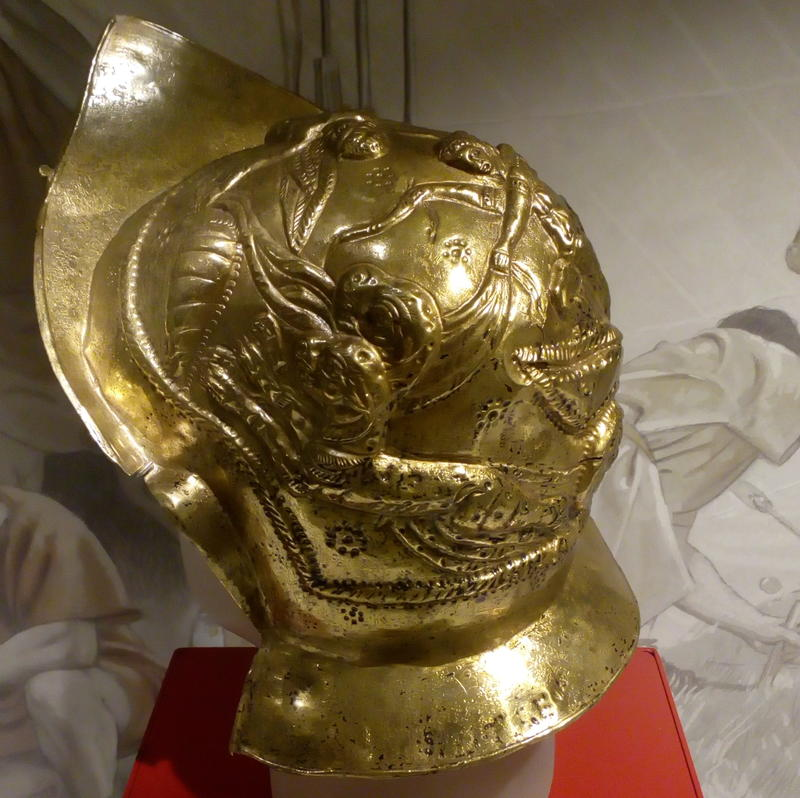
Bronze helmet with no visor-mask, also found at Newstead, showing a naked winged figure of Cupid driving a chariot.

Two other helmets were discovered in the same pit (Pit XXII) as the iron helmet with a face mask described above, and a bronze visor-mask was found in a pit in the bath buildings:

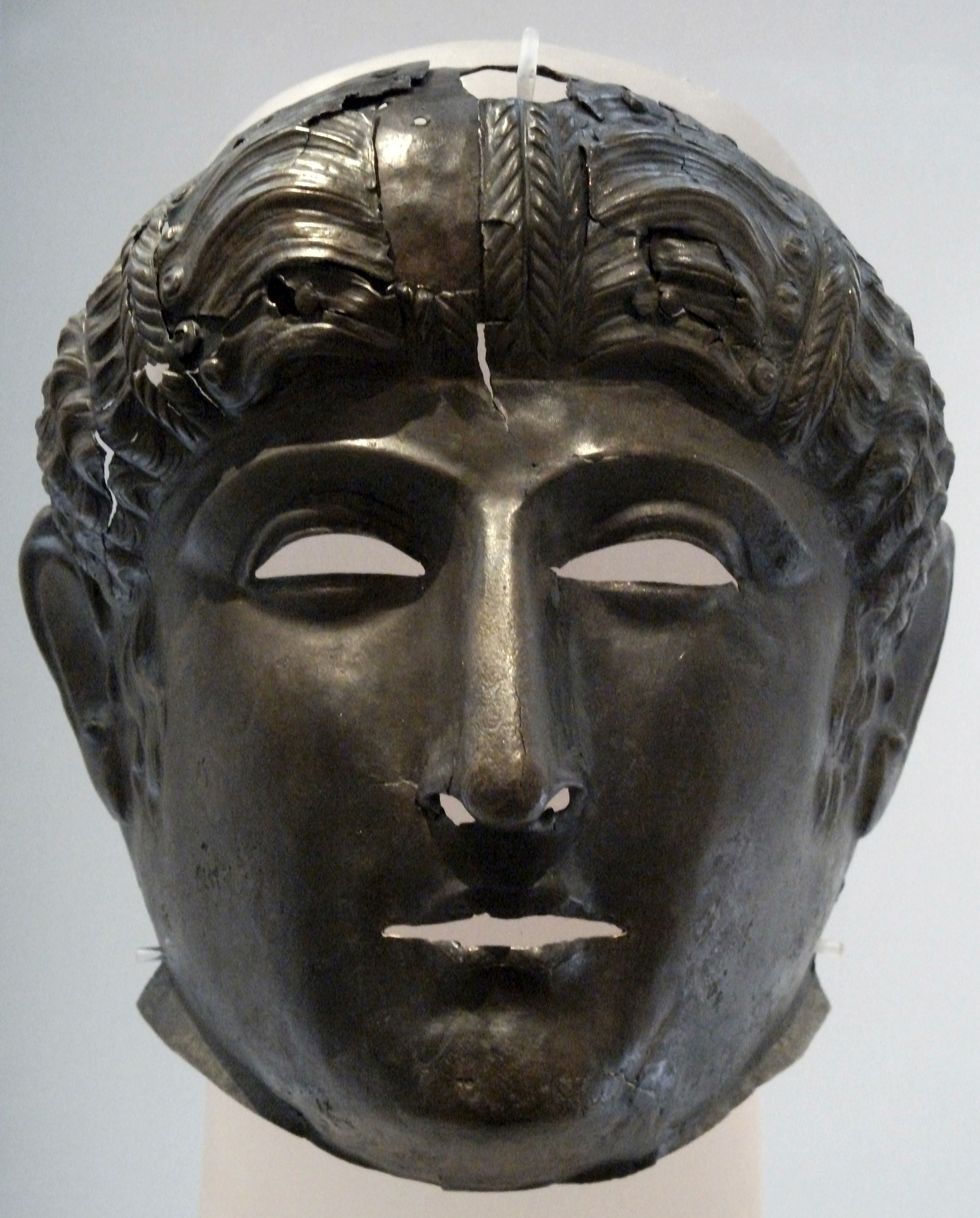
Bronze visor-mask with no helmet from Newstead

- An ornately decorated bronze helmet, with a design embossed in relief on one side showing a naked winged figure of Cupid driving a chariot pulled by a pair of leopards, while on the other side another winged figure, probably personifying Victory, holds what may be a palm branch in one hand and the leopards' harness in the other hand. It is probable that it would have originally been fitted with a face visor, but this is missing. On the rim at the back of the helmet is a punctured inscription of eight letters punched into the metal. The first four letters of the inscription are uncertain, but the last four letters read "TGES", which may stand for T[urmae] ("of the troop") followed by the name the commander of the troop, which is a formula found elsewhere.
- A plain iron legionary helmet with two hinged cheek pieces.
- A bronze visor-mask showing a youthful, beardless face with curly locks of hair. There is a hole beneath each ear, which may have been used to attach the mask to a helmet.
