= Ribchester Roman Museum =

Museum in Ribchester, England

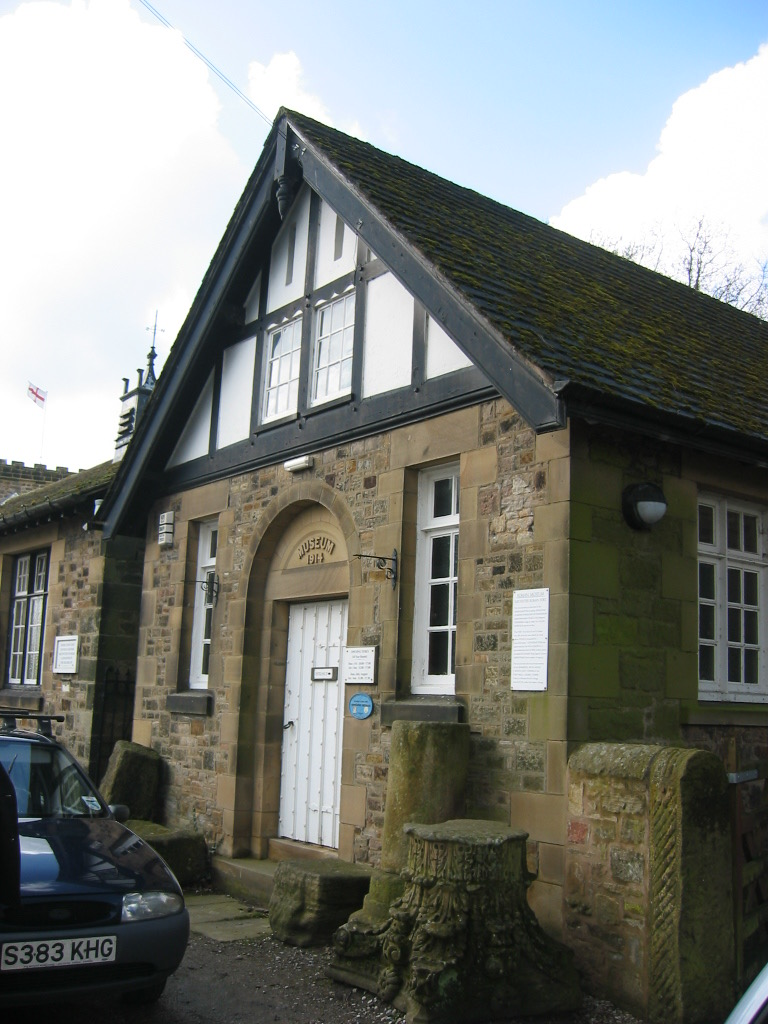
- The museum's entrance in 2006
- Established: 1915 (111 years ago)
- Location: Church Street, Ribchester, Lancashire, England
- Coordinates: 53°48′38″N 2°31′57″W
- Founder: Margaret Greenall

Ribchester Roman Museum (officially the Ribchester Roman Museum of Roman Antiquities) is located in the village of Ribchester, Lancashire, England. It sits at the southern end of Church Street, near the northern banks of the River Ribble, adjacent to St Wilfrid's Church. Founded in 1915 by Margaret Greenall, a member of Warrington's Greenall's brewing family, it is registered charity number 510490 with the UK Charity Commission.

The museum houses many of the finds from Bremetennacum, the Roman fort a few yards away. The most notable find, the Ribchester Helmet, is on show in replica; the original is in the British Museum collection.

The museum's former honorary curator, Jim Ridge, had a gallery at the museum named in his honour after his death in 2003. Ridge instigated a Time Team dig in Ribchester in September 1993 after writing to them regarding remnants of the Roman fort being in the back garden of his 2 Church Street cottage.

== Ribchester Helmet ==
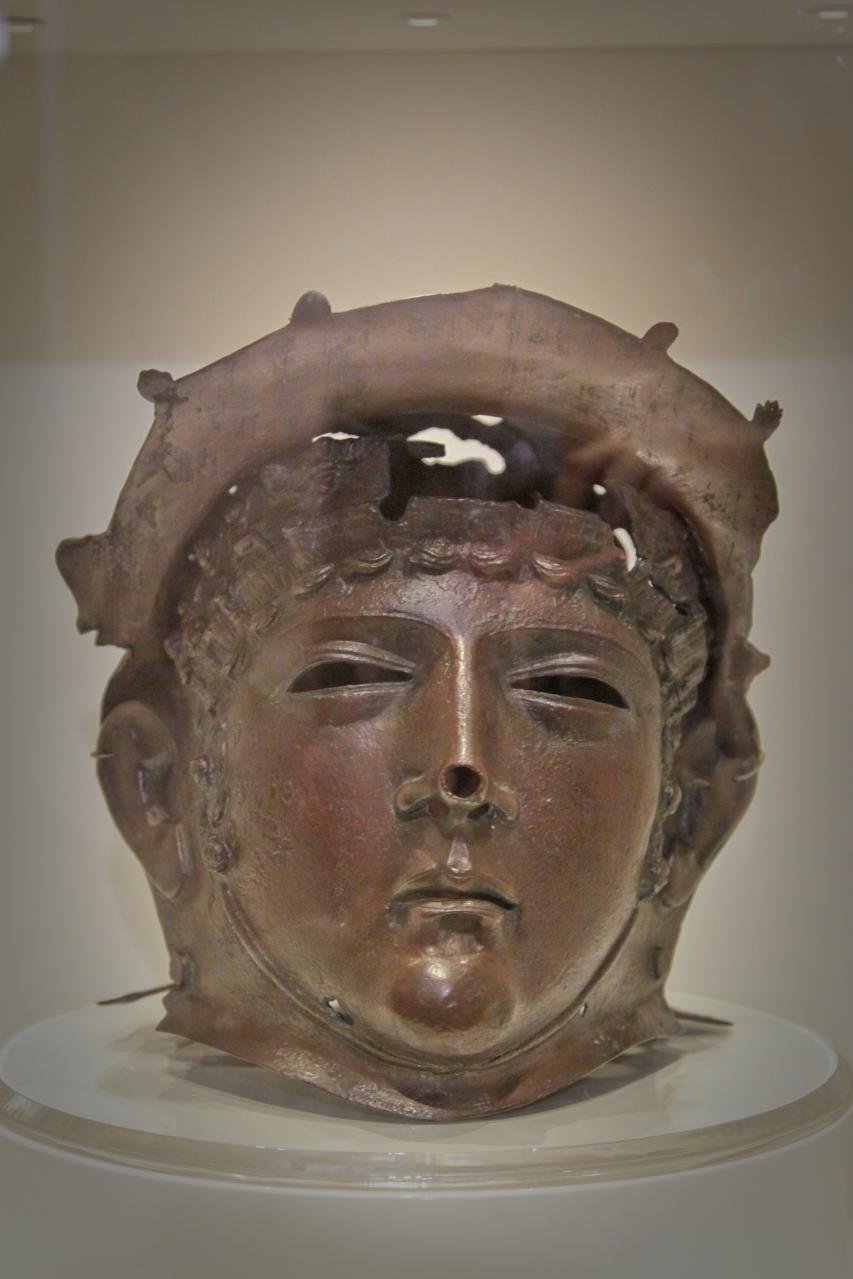
Replica of the helmet on display at the museum
