= The White Bull, Ribchester =

Pub in Lancashire, England

The White Bull

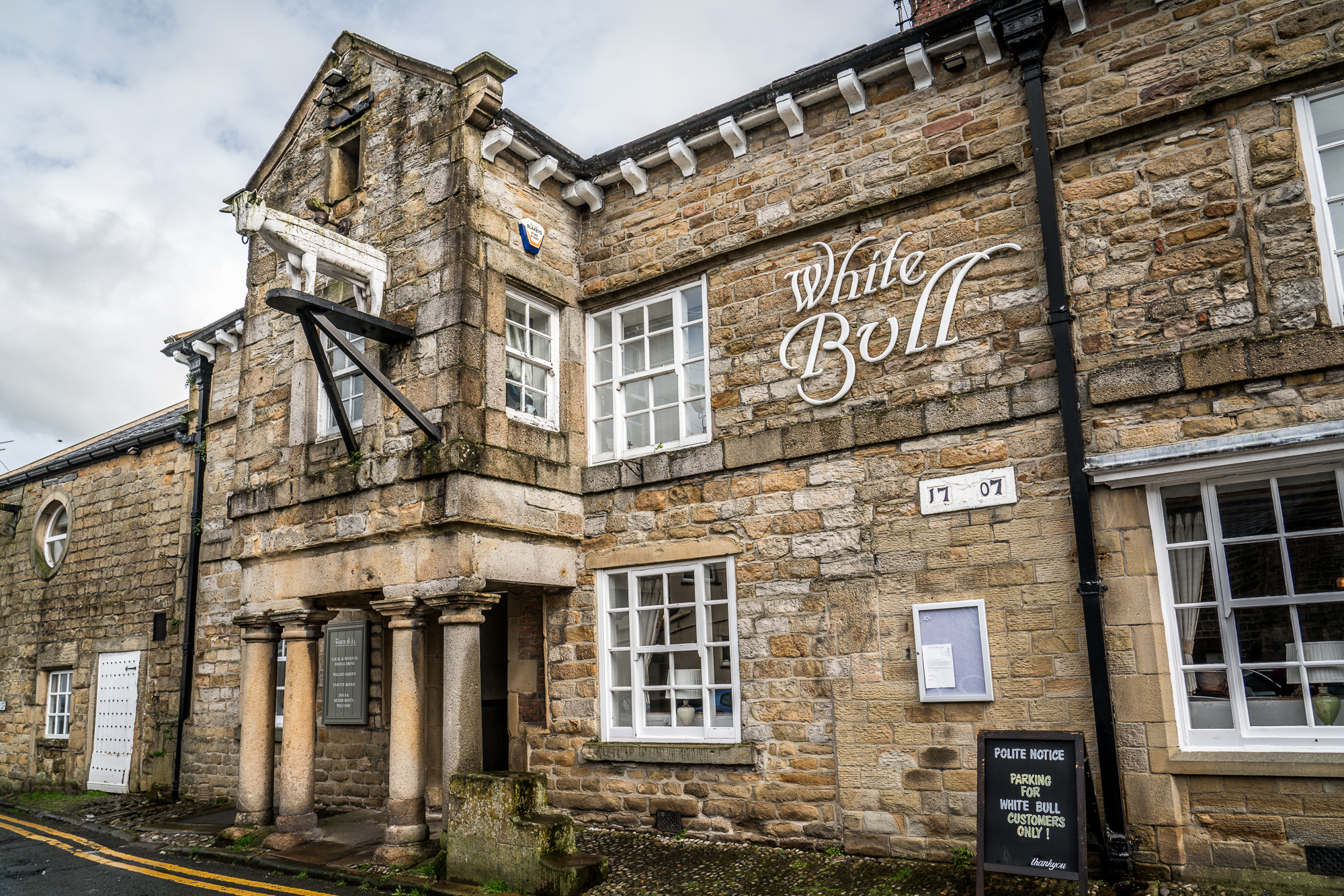
- The building in 2024
- Interactive map of the The White Bull area

General information
- Type: Public house
- Location: Church Street, Ribchester, Lancashire, England
- Coordinates: 53.81201°N 2.53232°W
- Completed: 1707 (319 years ago)
- Renovated: 2017
- Owner: Unknown

Technical details
- Material: Sandstone
- Floor count: 2

Other information
- Number of rooms: 3

Website
- https://whitebullribchester.com

The White Bull (also known as the White Bull Inn) is a public house and inn on Church Street (formerly one of the Roman Watling Streets) in the English village of Ribchester, Lancashire. It dates to 1707, although an alehouse is believed to have previously stood on the site. It is a Grade II listed building with some unique exterior features.

The building, which overlooks The Hillock, the ancient centre of the village, is made of sandstone with slate roofs, in two storeys and four bays. On the front is a protruding two-storey gabled porch with two pairs of Doric columns, possibly taken from a nearby Roman fort, specifically the tepidarium of the Roman baths. They are believed to have been recovered from the bed of the River Ribble.

The doorway has a moulded surround. Above the portico is a rustic wooden representation of a white bull. The right bay has been altered and contains a door and modern shop windows. To the left, a former stable has a doorway with a plain surround, a blocked doorway converted into a window with a dated lintel, and a circular pitching hole. The original door, to the right of today's main entrance, was filled in during the 1940s.

In the late 18th century, the building also served as the local courthouse for many years, with one of its rooms used for holding prisoners.

The inn, which has three rooms, was put up for sale, in January 2017, at an asking price in excess of £385,000. In 2019, it was bought by the Brooks family, who had previously owned it around the turn of the century, and was refurbished. It was sold again, in late 2023, to Dipak Patel and Julie Gainford. They put the business on the market two years later and a new owner took over in November 2025.

In 2022, the pub won the Tripadvisor Traveller's Choice Award.

The pub was patronised by the members of Time Team during their three-day visit to the village, in September 1993, which was focused on nearby 2 Church Street.

== Gallery ==
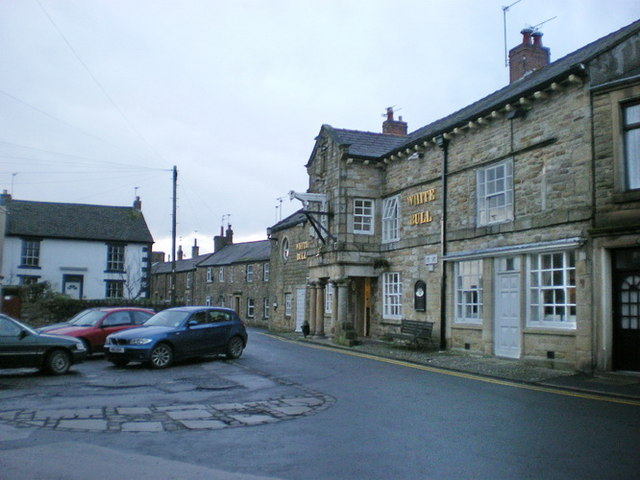
Viewed from Church Street, 2008

== Sources ==
- Historic England, "White Bull Hotel and former stable adjoining to the north, Ribchester (1308491)", National Heritage List for England
- Hartwell, Clare; Pevsner, Nikolaus (2009) [1969], Lancashire: North, The Buildings of England, New Haven and London: Yale University Press, ISBN 978-0-300-12667-9

== See also ==
- Listed buildings in Ribchester
