= Margaret Greenall =

English businesswoman

- Known for: Founding Ribchester Roman Museum

Margaret Greenall was an English businesswoman. She founded Ribchester Roman Museum in 1915. She was a member of the Greenall's brewery family.

== Life and career ==
Greenall's father, Joseph Robinson, died in 1905, aged 75. He bequeathed Margaret "an immediate legacy of £500 and his household effects and consumable stores". She was also left the income from a £20,000 trust fund.

In 1915, she established Ribchester Roman Museum after becoming concerned that many historic artefacts were being taken oit of the village, into the hands of private collectors. She had earlier purchased a row of houses on Church Street in Ribchester, near the River Ribble, and had the land excavated prior to building a new property, today's Churchgates. In 1928, an R. Greenall, the honorary secretary of the Ribchester Museum Trust, was living there. Margaret had previously held the role.

== Legacy ==
After her death, Greenall had dedicated to her The Roman Fort at Ribchester, a 1928 book by John Henry Hopkinson and Donald Atkinson. The dedication read:

MEMORIAE
MARGARETAE GREENALL
RERVM BREMETENNACENSIVM
FAVTRICI STVDIOSISSIMAE
HOC OPVSCVLM
GRATO ANIMO
DEDICATVR
