= The Hillock =

Open space in Ribchester, England

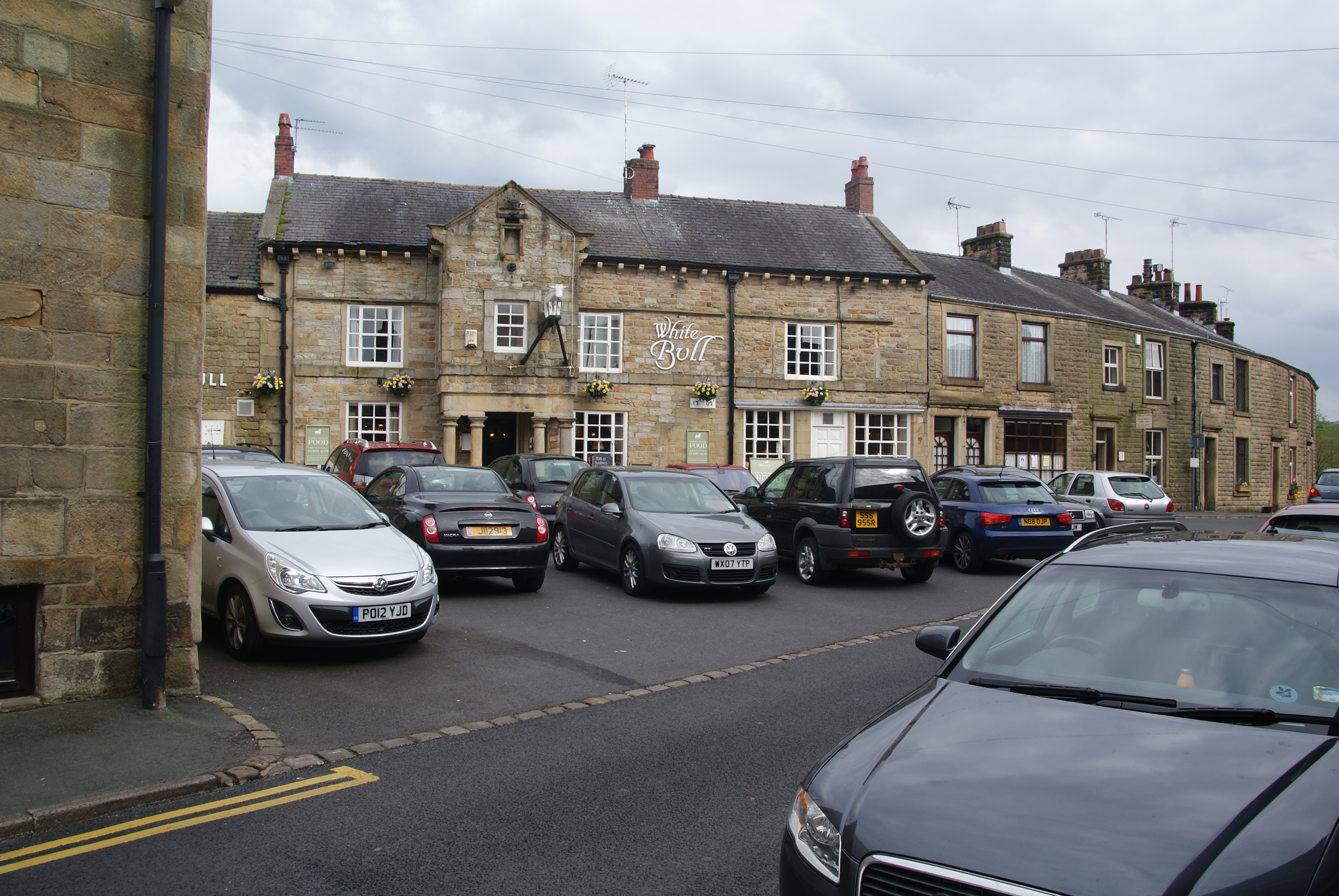
- The Hillock, now a car park, pictured in 2012
- Maintained by: Ribble Valley Borough Council
- Location: Ribchester, England, UK
- Coordinates: 53.81196°N 2.53251°W
- East: Water Street
- South: Church Street
- West: Church Street

Construction
- Completion: 1st century AD

The Hillock is the ancient centre of the village of Ribchester, Lancashire, England. Now located directly in front of the White Bull public house, and used for public parking, it dates to the 1st century. It is bounded to the west and south by Church Street and to the east by Water Street.

A Commons Registration Act 1965 decision in November 1980 upheld a 1955 land grant that permitted Duttons, then the brewery of the White Bull, to use the land as a car park.
