= Chris Haines =

Chris Haines may refer to:

- Chris Haines (skier)
- Chris Haines (reenactor)

== See also ==
- Kris Haines, American football wide receiver
