= 2 Church Street =

2 Church Street is the name of:

- 2 Church Street, Ormskirk, a historic building in Lancashire, in England
- 2 Church Street, Ribchester, a historic building in Lancashire, in England
