= Listed buildings in Dutton, Lancashire =

Dutton is a civil parish in Ribble Valley, Lancashire, England, located to the northeast of Ribchester. The parish is rural, with the River Ribble running to the south. It contains 15 buildings that are recorded in the National Heritage List for England as designated listed buildings. These mainly consist of houses with related structures, or farm buildings, but there are also a church, a bridge and two cross bases.

== Key ==
Grade	Criteria
Grade I	Buildings of exceptional interest, sometimes considered to be internationally important.
Grade II*	Particularly important buildings of more than special interest.
Grade II	Buildings of national importance and special interest.

== Buildings ==
Name and location	Photograph	Date	Notes	Grade
St Saviour's Church; 53.8190°N 2.5273°W		Late 12th century	This is a small chapel-like sandstone building with slate roofs in a single range with a southwest porch. It was owned by the Knights Hospitaller during the 13th century. The windows in the north wall are Norman, and those in the south wall are Perpendicular.	I
Dutton Hall; 53.8263°N 2.5149°W		c 1600	A sandstone country house consisting of a two-storey hall with a cross wing at each end. In the late 17th century a large bay was added. The windows are mullioned and transomed. The windows in the 17th-century bay have 14 lights, and on top of the bay is a balustrade acting as a viewing platform.	II*
Huntingdon Hall; 53.8451°N 2.5172°W		1619	A two-storey country house, which was restored in the 20th century. It is constructed in sandstone with a stone slate roof. The house has an H-plan; its features include mullioned windows and ball finials.	II*
Smith Bottom; 53.84145°N 2.5253°W	—	17th century	Although most of the fabric is from the 19th century, it contains 17th-century material with crucks from that century or earlier. The rest of the building is in sandstone with a slate roof.	II
Buildings, walls and gate piers, Dutton Hall; 53.8260°N 2.5148°W	—	17th century (probable)	Two sandstone farm buildings standing parallel and flanking the garden to the south of Dutton Hall. Connecting them at the southern end of the garden is a wall with a gateway and a pair of gate piers with ball finials.	II
Garden gateway, Dutton Manor; 53.8434°N 2.5302°W	—	1662	This was originally the entrance doorway to Buckley Hall, Ribchester. It is in sandstone, with a square stone above the lintel containing a carved unicorn and an inscription.	II
Hey Hurst; 53.8249°N 2.4907°W	—	Late 17th century	A two-storey sandstone country house with stone slate roofs. The windows are mullioned.	II
Lower Dutton Cottage; 53.8202°N 2.5166°W	—	Late 17th century	A two-storey sandstone house with a slate roof. It has an L-plan, and contains mullioned windows.	II
Tinker Field; 53.8499°N 2.5257°W	—	c. 1700	A two-storey sandstone house with a slate roof. There have been later alterations. The windows are mullioned, or mullioned and tramsomed.	II
Gate piers, Dutton Hall; 53.82596°N 2.51439°W	—	18th century	A pair of sandstone gate piers. They are square in cross-section, with cyma moulded cornices and finials.	II
Ribchester Bridge; 53.81593°N 2.51435°W		1774	A sandstone bridge carrying the B6245 road over the River Ribble. It has three segmental arches on triangular cutwaters.	II
Barn, Dutton Hall; 53.8263°N 2.5152°W	—	Early 19th century (probable)	A sandstone barn with a slate roof. It has a wide doorway, two windows and three rows of ventilation slits.	II
Dutton Manor; 53.8422°N 2.5291°W	—	1872	A country house originally designed by Isaac Taylor as a shooting lodge. It is constructed in sandstone with applied timber framing and slate roofs. Its features include cross-wings, and a tower with a pyramidal roof. Most of the windows are mullioned and transomed, but there are also some dormers and an oriel window.	II
Cross base, St Saviour's Churchyard; 53.8189°N 2.5268°W	—	Uncertain	This lies in the churchyard of St Saviour's Church. It consists of a rectangular piece of sandstone with a rectangular socket for a shaft, which is missing.	II
Cross base, near Eaves Barn; 53.81504°N 2.52174°W	—	Uncertain	This lies on the east side of Gallows Lane. It consists of a square piece of sandstone with a square socket for a shaft, which is missing.	II
