= 8 Blackburn Road =

Building in Lancashire, England

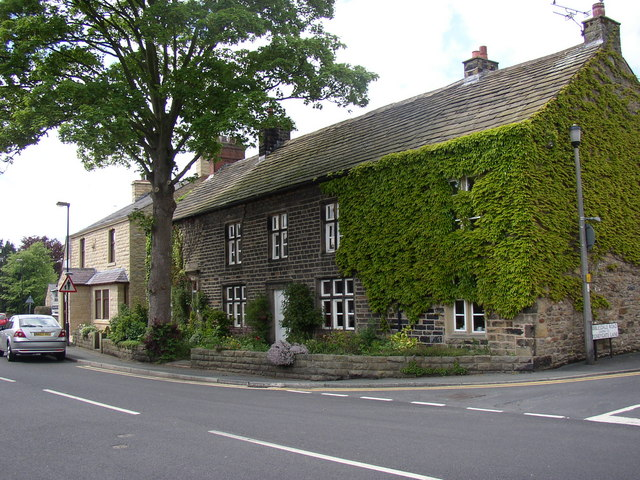
- Number 8 is in the middle of the block, pictured here in 2007 looking west
- Interactive map of the 8 Blackburn Road area

General information
- Location: Blackburn Road, Ribchester, Lancashire, England
- Coordinates: 53.81373°N 2.53213°W
- Completed: Early 18th century

Technical details
- Material: Sandstone
- Floor count: 2

8 Blackburn Road is a building in the English village of Ribchester, Lancashire. Standing at the junction of Blackburn Road and Ribblesdale Road, it dates to the early 18th century and is a Grade II listed building.

It is constructed of sandstone, with a stone-slate roof, in two storeys with an attic and four bays. The windows have mullions and transoms, and the doorway has an architrave.

Inside, a dog-leg staircase continues up to the attic via four flights. A three-light chamfered mullioned window in the east attic wall is now blocked by the adjoining house.

== Sources ==
- Historic England, "No. 8 Blackburn Road, Ribchester (1147442)", National Heritage List for England

== See also ==
- Listed buildings in Ribchester
