= Simon James (archaeologist) =

British archaeologist

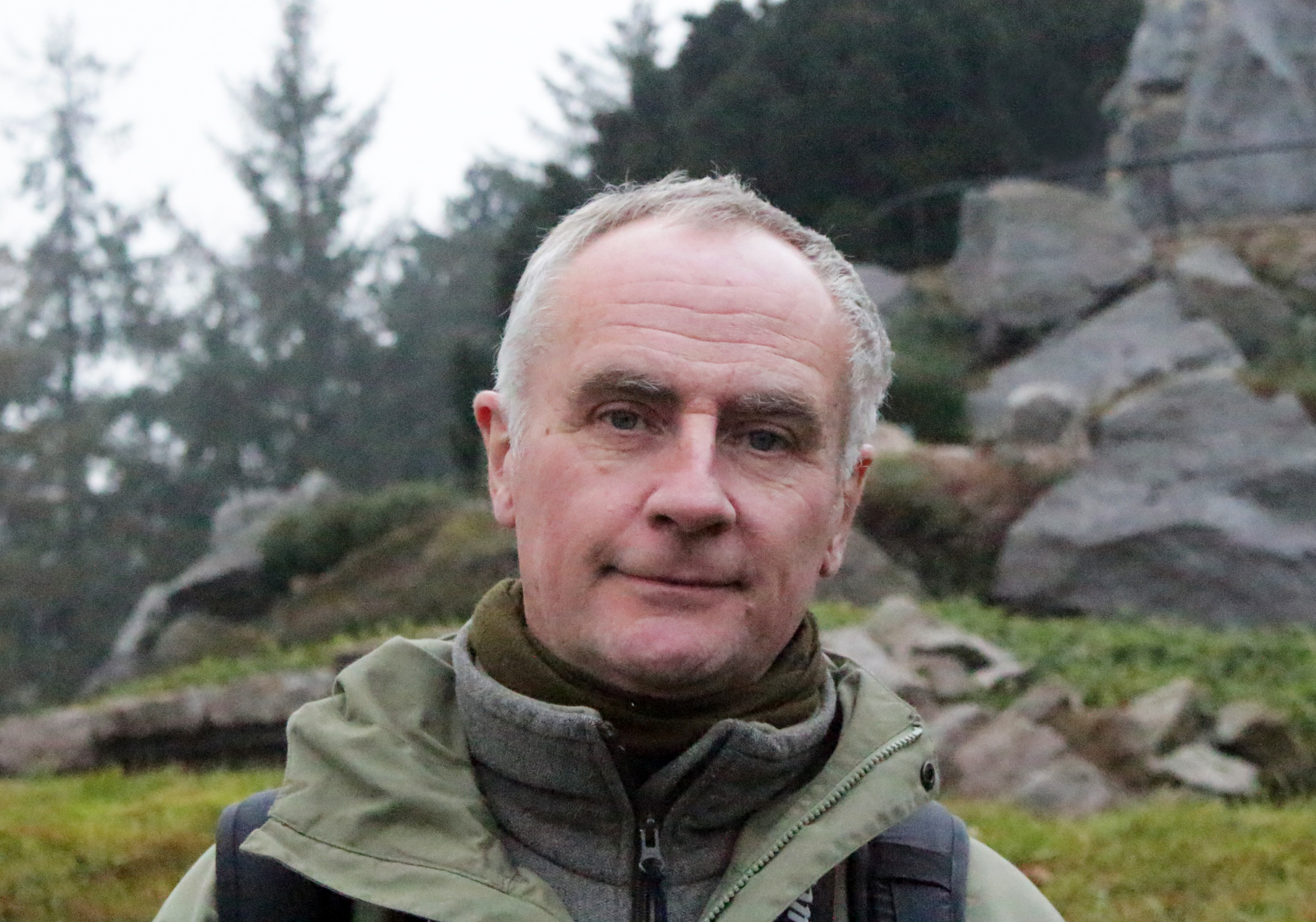
- Occupations: Professor, author
- Years active: 2000–present
- Board member of: President of the Ermine Street Guard

Academic background
- Education: University College London

Academic work
- Discipline: Archaeologist
- Sub-discipline: Iron Age and Roman specialist
- Institutions: British Museum, Durham University, University of Leicester

Simon James is an archeologist of the Iron Age and Roman period and an author. He is Professor of Archaeology at the University of Leicester in England. His research interests are the Roman world and its interactions with the Celts and Middle Eastern peoples. Since 2012 he has served as president for the Ermine Street Guard.

== Education and academic career ==
James obtained his PhD from University College London, and then moved to the British Museum, where he was an archaeological illustrator before becoming a museum educator. After several years as a Research Fellow at Durham University he joined the School of Archaeology and Ancient History at the University of Leicester in 2000. His research has focused on ancient warfare and especially the Roman military. He has studied the remarkably well-preserved Roman and Partho-Sasanian military remains from Dura-Europos, Syria. In reinterpreting the evidence for mines and counter-mines dug beneath the city's walls during the Sasanian Persian siege which finally destroyed Dura about AD 256, he concluded that the Sasanian attackers had used a Greek stratagem on the Roman defenders: they asphyxiated about 20 of them with toxic smoke from burning bitumen and sulphur. This appears to be the earliest archaeologically known instance of what we would now call 'chemical warfare'.

== Influence on current cultural debates ==
It is his publications on the Ancient Celts that have drawn most public and media attention.

== Books and monographs ==
- "Two Shield-bosses from Roman London" (1980), Britannia XI, 320–3.
- Archaeology in Britain (1986), British Museum Publications.
- James, Simon (1986). "Evidence from Dura Europos for the Origins of Late Roman Helmets". Syria. LXIII (1–2). Institut Francais du Proche-Orient: 107–134. doi:10.3406/syria.1986.6923. JSTOR 4198539.
- Exploring the World of the Celts (1993), Thames and Hudson.
- Britain and the Celtic Iron Age (1997), British Museum Press (with Valery Rigby)
- The Atlantic Celts: Ancient People or Modern Invention?, British Museum Press, 1999 (Published in the US by The University of Wisconsin Press, 1999).
- "Britons and Romans" (2001), CBA Research Report 125, (with M Millett)
- "Writing the Legions: The Past, Present and Future of Roman Military Studies in Britain" (2002), Archaeological Journal 159; 1–58.
- Excavations at Dura-Europos Final Report VII, the Arms and Armour and Other Military Equipment (2004), British Museum Press.
- "A Bloodless Past: The Pacification of Early Iron Age Britain" (2007); In Haselgrove and Pope, The Earlier Iron Age in Britain and the Near Continent, Oxbow Press.
- Rome and the Sword: How Warriors and Weapons Shaped Roman History (2011), Thames and Hudson.
