= Ribchester Bridge =

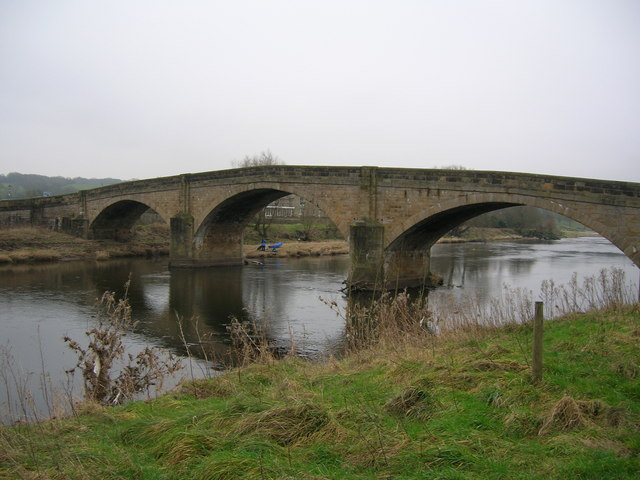
- The northern side of the bridge in 2006
- Coordinates: 53.81593°N 2.51435°W
- Carries: B6245 (Ribchester Road)
- Crosses: River Ribble
- Locale: Clayton-le-Dale, Lancashire, England
- Heritage status: Grade II listed

Characteristics
- Total length: 71.8 metres (236 ft)
- Longest span: 23.2 metres (76 ft)

History
- Opened: 1774 (252 years ago)

Statistics
- Daily traffic: Yes
- Toll: No

Location
- Interactive map of Ribchester Bridge

Ribchester Bridge is a toll-free, three-span bridge over the River Ribble near Ribchester, Lancashire, England. A Grade II listed structure about 0.75 miles (1.21 km) east of the village, it actually crosses the river between the civil parishes of Clayton-le-Dale and Dutton. The bridge carries the two-lane traffic of the B6245 Ribchester Road.

Thought to have been constructed in 1774, it is built of sandstone and consists of three segmental arches on triangular cutwaters, with a string course and a solid parapet. The bridge has an overall length 71.8 metres (236 ft) and width of 6.8 metres (22 ft) (deck plus 300-millimetre (12 in)-wide parapets). The central span in the largest at 23.2 metres (76 ft) with a rise of 5.5 metres (18 ft), with the others of differing, slightly smaller dimensions.

This point on the river is above the tidal limit, the banks approximately 27 metres (90 ft) above the Ordnance datum. It has been an important crossing for millennia with the Roman fort here positioned to guard it; however, the origin of the earliest bridge is uncertain. The current bridge's predecessor had been constructed in 1669. William Stukeley in his Itinerarium Curiosum, published in 1721, described it as "a noble bridge of four very large arches" half a mile above Ribchester. The county authorities must have been aware of problems, as in 1769 tenders were invited for its reconstruction, but it collapsed during a flood in 1772.

That bridge had also replaced another of unknown age. A charter of 1354 gave permission for the building of a bridge of wood or stone across the river at a place called 'Madynford', also granting some land for the use of the ferryman; however, this was possibly considerably downstream, near Osbaldeston Hall, where a ferry-crossing was still recorded in the mid-19th century.

== See also ==
- Listed buildings in Clayton-le-Dale
- Listed buildings in Dutton, Lancashire
