= Dutton, Lancashire =

Civil parish in Lancashire, England

Coordinates: 53.82636°N 2.51498°W

Dutton
- Clitheroe Road, Dutton (2010)

- Shown within Ribble Valley Location within Lancashire
- Area: 3.0969254 sq mi (8.021000 km^{2})
- Population: 208 (2021 Census)
  - Density: 67/sq mi (26/km^{2})
- OS grid reference: SD662368
  - London: 188.75 mi (303.76 km)
- Civil parish: Dutton
- District: Ribble Valley
- Shire county: Lancashire
- Region: North West
- Country: England
- Sovereign state: United Kingdom
- Post town: PRESTON
- Postcode district: PR3
- Dialling code: 01254
- Police: Lancashire
- Fire: Lancashire
- Ambulance: North West
- UK Parliament: Ribble Valley

Dutton is a civil parish in the Borough of Ribble Valley in the English county of Lancashire, its principal settlement being the hamlet of Lower Dutton. The population of the civil parish at the 2021 Census was 208. The parish is situated northeast of Ribchester.

Barn at Dutton Hall (2014)

Dutton is a civil parish situated between the villages of Hurst Green 1.57 miles (2.53 km) to the east and Knowle Green 1.58 miles (2.54 km) to the west in Lancashire and lies approximately 26.72 miles (43.00 km) north of the city of Manchester. According to the University of Nottingham English Place-names project, the settlement name Dutton could mean 'Dudda's farm/settlement'; Dudda (pers.n.) [Old English] personal name, tūn (tun) [Old English] An enclosure; a farmstead; a village; an estate.

== Geography ==
The parish of Dutton extends roughly north–south between the villages of Hurst Green and Knowle Green, covering an area of 3.093 square miles (8.01 km^{2}). Its northern end reaches Longridge Fell, while the River Ribble forms its southern boundary.

=== Geology ===
The bedrock in the northern part of the parish, extending south to approximately the northern side of Old Clitheroe Road, consists of sandstone of the Pendle Grit Member, deposited around 328 million years ago. To the south lies a band of Warley Wise Grit sandstone, extending to the parish's narrowest east–west section. Mudstone of the Silsden Formation underlies much of the southern half of the parish, interspersed with sandstone bands running broadly east–west. These sedimentary rocks formed in river channels, floodplains and deltas within a coastal environment subject to periodic marine inundation.

Superficial deposits consist predominantly of Devensian till. Extensive glaciofluvial deposits extend into the central part of the parish from the east and northwards through its centre. River terrace deposits of sand and gravel occur in the south, alongside the northern bank of the River Ribble.

== History ==
Dutton originally formed part of Amounderness under the Lordship of Earl Tosti in 1066, and was subsequently incorporated into Blackburn Hundred. It later constituted a township in the ancient parish of Ribchester, within the lower division of Blackburn Hundred.

By 1870, Dutton was a township in the parish of Ribchester, covering 1,809 acres and containing 59 houses, with a population of 312. According to Kelly's Directory, its population had declined to 229 by 1901. Dutton formed part of Preston Rural District from its establishment in 1894 until its abolition in 1974, when the parish became part of the borough of Ribble Valley.

== Dutton Hall ==
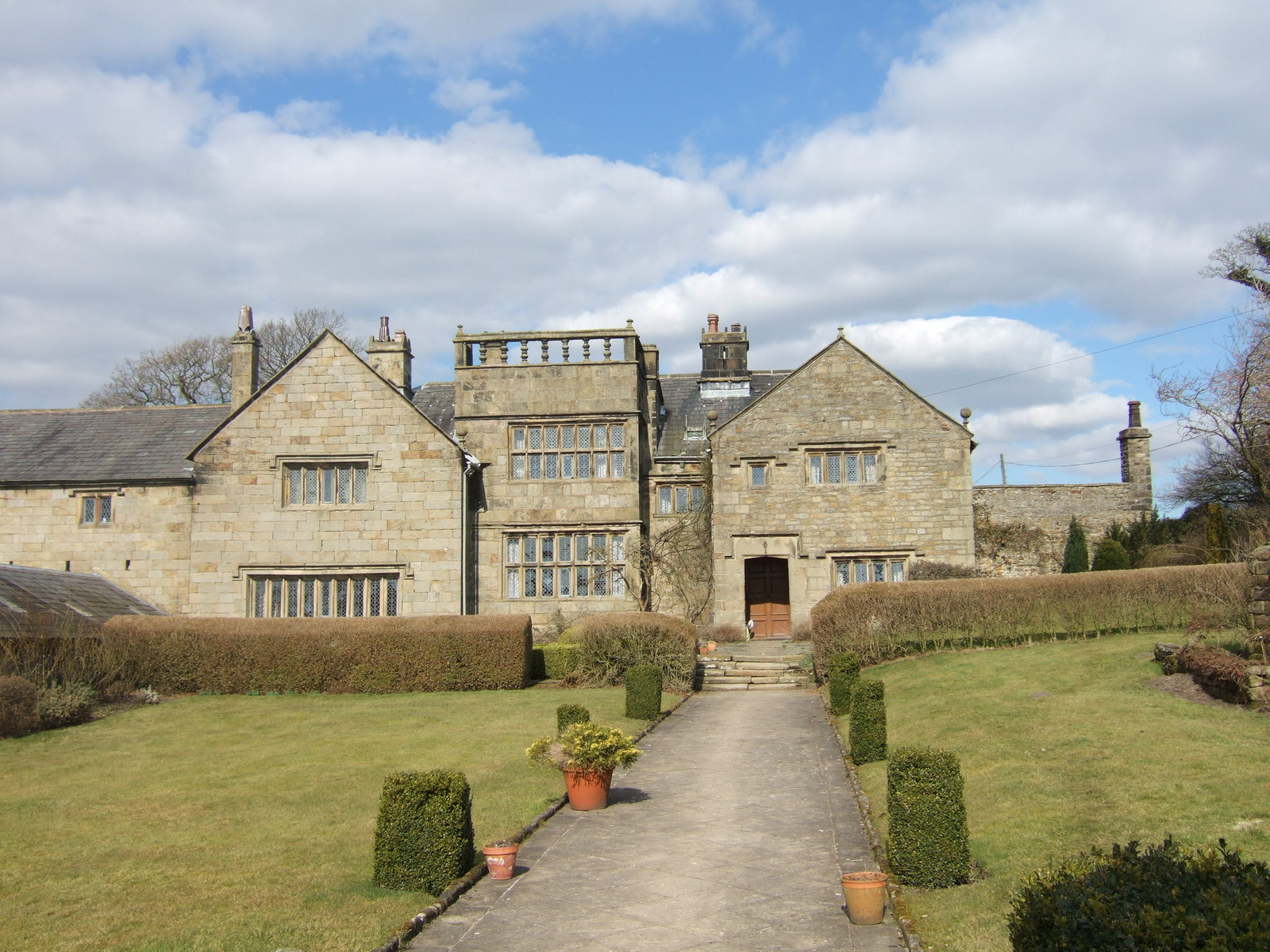
Dutton Hall (2010)

Dutton Hall is a Grade II* listed building on Gallows Lane. It is thought to have been built for Richard Townley around 1670–1680, although the Townley family is recorded as renting land in the area as early as the 14th century. Today, the hall's rose gardens are open to the public on selected event days.

== See also ==
- Listed buildings in Dutton, Lancashire
- Ribchester Bridge
