= Listed buildings in Ribchester =

Ribchester is a civil parish in Ribble Valley, Lancashire, England. It contains 23 listed buildings that are recorded in the National Heritage List for England. Of these, one is listed at Grade I, the highest of the three grades, one is at Grade II*, the middle grade, and the others are at Grade II, the lowest grade. The parish contains the village of Ribchester, and surrounding countryside. Most of the listed buildings are houses and associated structures, or farmhouses and farm buildings, some of which are in the village, and others are in the rural area. The other listed buildings are two churches, a presbytery, a sundial, a public house with a mounting block outside, a bridge, and almshouses with a wellhead in the grounds.

== Key ==
Grade	Criteria
I	Buildings of exceptional interest, sometimes considered to be internationally important
II*	Particularly important buildings of more than special interest
II	Buildings of national importance and special interest

== Buildings ==
Name and location	Photograph	Date	Notes	Grade
St Wilfrid's Church; 53.81030°N 2.53325°W		13th century	Additions and alterations were made to the church in the succeeding centuries, and it was restored in 1881. The church is built in sandstone with stone-slate roofs, and consists of a nave, a south aisle, a south porch, a chancel, a north chapel, and a west tower. The tower has three stages, angle buttresses, and an embattled parapet. Above the south aisle are two crude dormer windows.	I
9 and 10 West View and barn 53.83709°N 2.55329°W	—	17th century	Originally a barn, part of which was converted into two cottages in the 19th century. It is in sandstone and has a roof partly of slate and partly of asbestos sheet. The openings include wide entrances with triangular heads, doorways, windows, and ventilation slits.	II
Knoll Hall; 53.83721°N 2.55295°W	—	17th century	A country house in sandstone with a hipped stone-slate roof. It has a U-shaped plan, and is in two storeys, Most of the windows are mullioned. The doorway has a moulded surround, and a triangular head with a hood mould. Inside the house is a bressumer, and a timber-framed wall.	II
Old Buckley Hall; 53.82470°N 2.55077°W	—	17th century	The house, later used as a farm building, is in sandstone with a stone-slate roof, and is in two storeys. The openings include doorways, windows and pitching holes.	II
Yew Tree Farmhouse; 53.82670°N 2.55772°W	—	Late 17th century	A sandstone house with a rendered front and a slate roof, in two storeys and three bays. The windows are mullioned. On the front is a 19th-century gabled porch that has an outer doorway with a chamfered surround. The 17th-century inner doorway also has a chamfered surround and a four-centred head.	II
48 Church Street; 53.81292°N 2.53339°W		1680	A sandstone house with a slate roof, in two storeys with attics, and with the gable end facing the street, In the centre is a doorway with long-and-short jambs, and a lintel carved with the date and with heart motifs. The ground floor windows are modern, in the upper floor is a three-light mullioned window, and in the attic is a one-light window. To the left is a modern garage.	II
White Bull Hotel and stable 53.81201°N 2.53232°W		1707	A public house in sandstone with slate roofs, in two storeys and four bays. On the front is a protruding two-storey gabled porch with two pairs of Doric columns. The doorway has a moulded surround. The right bay has been altered and contains a door and modern shop windows. To the left, the former stable has a doorway with a plain surround, a blocked doorway converted into a window with a dated lintel, and a circular pitching hole.	II
8 Blackburn Road; 53.81373°N 2.53213°W		Early 18th century (probable)	A sandstone house with a stone-slate roof, in two storeys with an attic and four bays. The windows have mullions and transoms, and the doorway has an architrave.	II
Almshouse; 53.81736°N 2.52727°W		1728	The almshouses are in two storeys and five bays with a stone-slate roof. The middle three bays are in sandstone and the outer bays are in brick. There is a central flight of 16 steps leading to a first floor arcade with three semicircular arches carried on unfluted Doric columns and half-columns. Above this is a truncated shaped gable, surmounted by a cornice. The outer bays contain sash windows.	II*
28 and 29 Church Street; 53.81270°N 2.53335°W	—	1745	A pair of brick houses with sandstone dressings and a slate roof, in two storeys. Both houses have doorways with architraves and cornices, and the windows also have architraves. No. 28, on the right, has three bays and sash windows, and No. 28 has one bay and modern windows.	II
Sundial; 53.81016°N 2.53292°W		18th century	The sundial is in the churchyard of St Wilfrid's Church. It is in sandstone and stands on six square steps. The sundial has a square plan, and consists of a baluster with a moulded capital, on which is an octagonal brass plate and a broken gnomon.	II
23 and 24 Church Street; 53.81216°N 2.53289°W	—	Late 18th century	A pair of weavers' houses in sandstone with a slate roof, in two storeys, with No. 24 being lower. The windows and doors have plain surrounds. To the left of the door of No. 24 is a tunnel entrance with a semicircular head, a projecting keystone, and imposts.	II
25 and 26 Church Street; 53.81226°N 2.53297°W	—	Late 18th century	A pair of weavers' houses in sandstone with a slate roof, in three storeys. The windows in No. 28 are sashes, and in No. 29 they are modern. Each house has a doorway to the left with a triangular moulded hood on shaped stone brackets. Between the houses is a tunnel entrance with a semicircular head, a projecting keystone, and imposts.	II
St Peter and St Paul's Church; 53.81736°N 2.52795°W		1789	A Roman Catholic church in sandstone with chamfered quoins and a slate roof. The windows have round heads with projecting imposts and keystones. On the north front is a doorway with a semicircular head and a fanlight. To the west is a single-storey bay linking the church to the presbytery.	II
Stydd Lodge and outbuilding 53.81719°N 2.52808°W		1789	This is the presbytery to St Peter and St Paul's Church. It is in sandstone with a slate roof, and has two storeys, chamfered quoins, and a symmetrical three-bay front. The windows have plain surrounds, and the doorway has an architrave, a fluted frieze, and a moulded cornice. To the west is a single-storey one-bay link to a two-storey outbuilding with a hipped roof.	II
16–22 Church Street; 53.81195°N 2.53275°W		1793	A row of seven weavers' houses in sandstone with roofs of slate or stone-slate. They have two storeys with attics. Some of the windows have mullions, and almost all the glazing is modern. The doorways have plain surrounds, and there are tunnel entrances, some with flat heads, and others with semicircular heads and keystones.	II
8–15 Church Street; 53.81168°N 2.53258°W	—	1795	A row of eight weavers' houses in sandstone with a slate roof. The windows and doorways have plain surrounds, and there are two tunnel entrances, each with a semicircular head, a projecting keystone, and imposts. Nos. 8 and 9 have triangular moulded door hoods, and No. 8 has an inscribed plaque.	II
50–58 Church Street; 53.81260°N 2.53296°W	—	1795	A row of nine houses in sandstone with a slate roof. Each house has one bay, and a door on the right. The windows and doorways have plain surrounds, and all the windows are modern. No. 55 has an extra window, and No. 56 has a doorcase with fluted pilasters, a fluted frieze, and an open pediment on console brackets. Above it is a dated plaque.	II
61 and 62 Church Street; 53.81216°N 2.53261°W		1798	A pair of houses in sandstone with a modern tile roof. They have two storeys with basements that were originally loomshops. Each house has one bay, and there are central doorways with plain surrounds approached by five stone steps. The windows of No. 61 are sashes.	II
Bridge over Boyce's Brook; 53.81446°N 2.52774°W	—	c. 1800 (probable)	The bridge carries Stydd Lane over Boyce's Brook. It is in sandstone, and consists of a single segmental arch. The bridge has a string course, a solid parapet, and a weathered coping.	II
Stone House; 53.81385°N 2.53014°W	—	Early to mid 19th century	A sandstone house with chamfered quoins and a slate roof, in two storeys and with a symmetrical three-bay front. The doorway is approached by three steps, and has two attached Ionic columns and an entablature.	II
Wellhead; 53.81714°N 2.52711°W	—	19th century (probable)	The wellhead is in the garden of the almshouses. It is circular, and is formed by four pieces of sandstone joined by iron clamps. On the top is a spindle with a wooden roller. and there is a handle on a cast-iron wheel.	II
Mounting block 53.81197°N 2.53241°W	—	Uncertain	The mounting block is in front of the White Bull Hotel. It consists of a single block of sandstone, cut into three steps.	II
