= Almshouse, Ribchester =

Listed building in Lancashire, England

Ribchester Almshouse
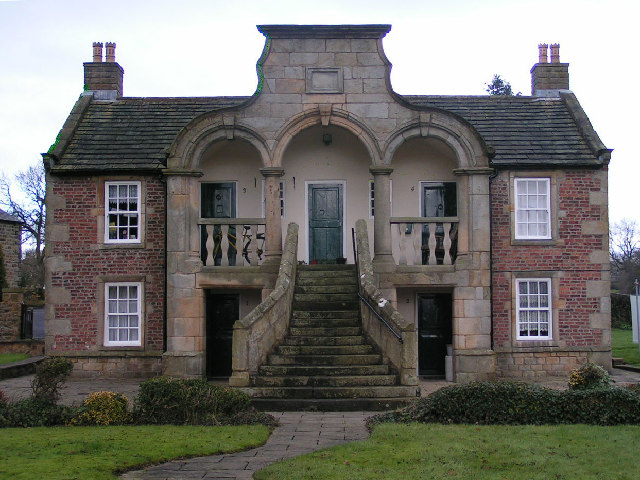
- The building in 2005

- Location within the Borough of Ribble Valley

General information
- Type: Almshouse
- Location: Stydd Lane, Stydd, Ribchester, Lancashire, England
- Coordinates: 53.81736°N 2.52727°W
- Completed: 1728; 298 years ago
- Renovated: 1990

Height
- Architectural: Italianate

Technical details
- Material: Sandstone and brick
- Floor count: 2

Listed Building – Grade II*
- Official name: Almshouses
- Designated: 25 July 1952
- Reference no.: 1308488

Ribchester Almshouse is a building on Stydd Lane in the English manor of Stydd, near Ribchester, Lancashire. It dates to 1728 and is a Grade II* listed building. It stands in a small garth adjoining the priest's garden.

The almshouses are in two storeys and five bays with a stone-slate roof. The middle three bays are in sandstone and the outer bays are in brick. There is a central flight of 16 steps leading to a first floor arcade with three semicircular arches carried on unfluted Doric columns and half-columns. Above this is a truncated shaped gable, surmounted by a cornice. The outer bays contain sash windows. Originally, at least, the interior consisted of six sets of rooms, each containing a sitting room, bedroom and pantry, on two floors.

The building was constructed under the terms of the will of local landowner John Shireburn (d. 1726), who wanted built "a good almshouse on his estate at Stydd for five poor persons to live separately therein".

In 1990 the building was restored and converted into four flats, administered by the Eaves Brook Housing Association, part of the Manchester and District Housing Association.

== See also ==
- Grade II* listed buildings in Lancashire
- Listed buildings in Ribchester

== Sources ==
- Historic England, "Almshouses, Ribchester (1308488)", National Heritage List for England
- Hartwell, Clare; Pevsner, Nikolaus (2009) [1969], Lancashire: North, The Buildings of England, New Haven and London: Yale University Press, ISBN 978-0-300-12667-9
