= Ribchester Helmet =

Ceremonial Roman helmet found in England in 1796

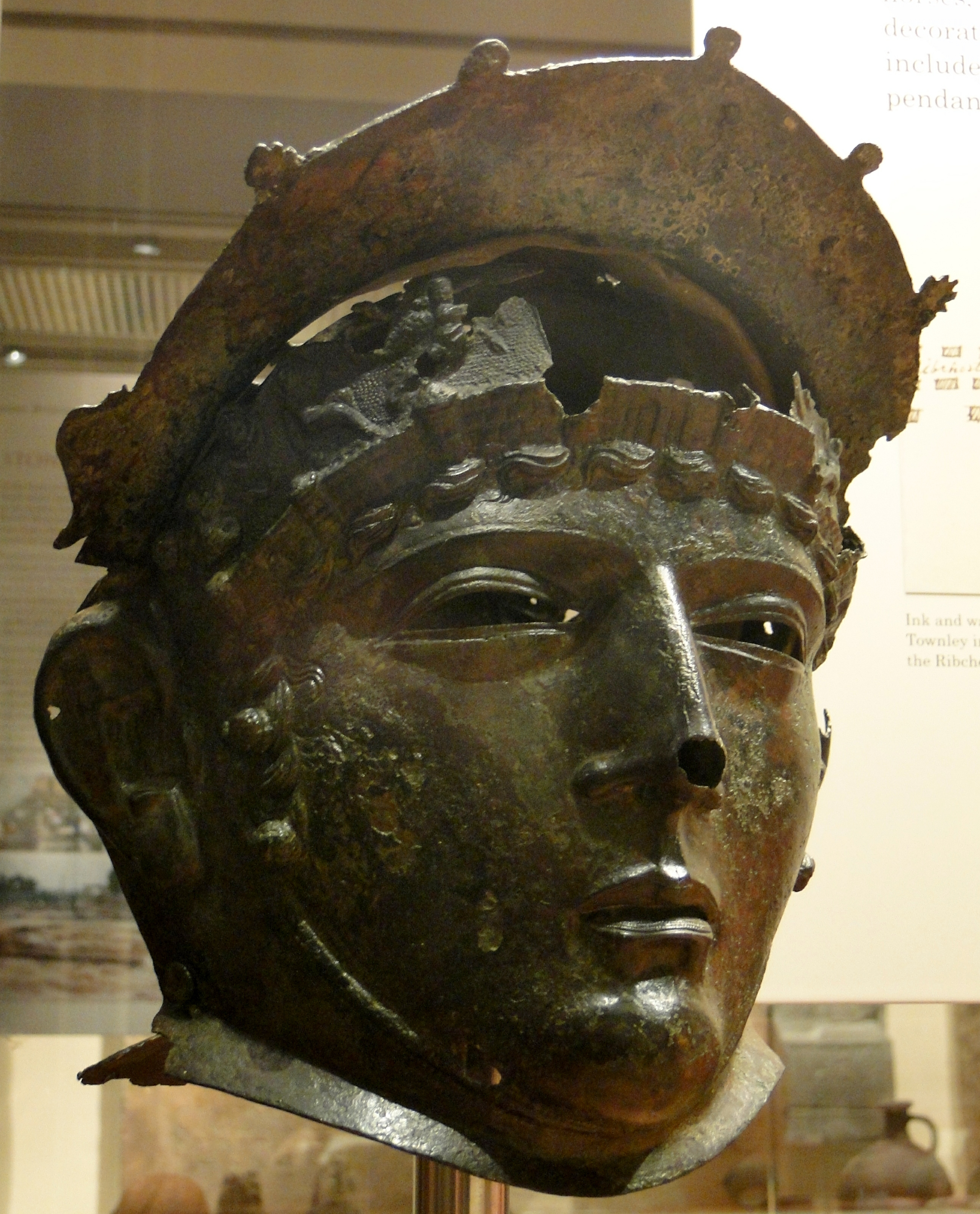
- On display in the British Museum
- Material: Bronze
- Size: Height: 276 mm Weight: 1305.6 g
- Created: Roman, late 1st to early 2nd century AD
- Discovered: By son of Joseph Walton, clogmaker, in 1796
- Place: Ribchester, Lancashire
- Present location: Room 49, British Museum, London
- Registration: 1814,0705.1

The Ribchester Helmet is a Roman bronze ceremonial helmet dating to between the late 1st and early 2nd centuries AD, which is now on display at the British Museum. It was found in Ribchester, Lancashire, England in 1796, as part of the Ribchester Hoard. The model of a sphinx that was believed to attach to the helmet was lost.

== Description ==
The helmet was impractical for protecting a soldier in battle. The helmet was intended for displays of elite horsemanship known as hippika gymnasia or cavalry sports.

== Provenance ==
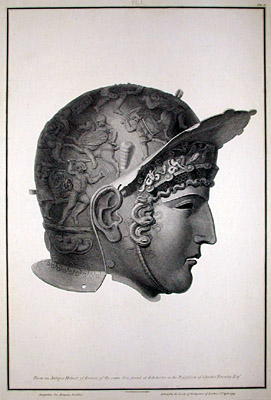
An engraving by James Basire for Charles Townley

The helmet was part of the Ribchester Hoard, which was discovered in the summer of 1796 by the son of Joseph Walton, a clogmaker. The boy found the items buried in a hollow, about three metres below the surface, on some waste land by the side of a road leading to Ribchester church, and near a river bed. The hoard was thought to have been stored in a wooden box and consisted of the corroded remains of a number of items but the largest was this helmet. In addition to the helmet, the hoard included a number of paterae, pieces of a vase, a bust of Minerva, fragments of two basins, several plates, and some other items that the antiquarian collector Charles Townley thought had religious uses. The finds were thought to have survived so well because they were covered in sand.

The helmet and other items were bought from Walton by Townley, who lived nearby at Towneley Hall. Townley was a well-known collector of Roman sculpture and antiquities, who had himself and his collection recorded in an oil painting by Johann Zoffany. Townley reported the details of the find in a detailed letter to the secretary of the Society of Antiquaries, intended for publication in the Society's Proceedings: it was his only publication. The helmet, together with the rest of Townley's collection, was sold to the British Museum in 1814 by his cousin, Peregrine Edward Towneley, who had inherited the collection on Townley's death in 1805.

In addition to the items purchased by Townley, there was also originally a bronze figurine of a sphinx, but it was lost after Walton gave it to the children of one of his brothers to play with. Thomas Dunham Whitaker, who examined the hoard soon after it had been discovered, suggested the sphinx would have been attached to the top of the helmet, as it has a curved base fitting the curvature of the helmet, and has traces of solder on it. This theory has become more plausible with the discovery of the Crosby Garrett Helmet in 2010, to which is attached a winged griffin.

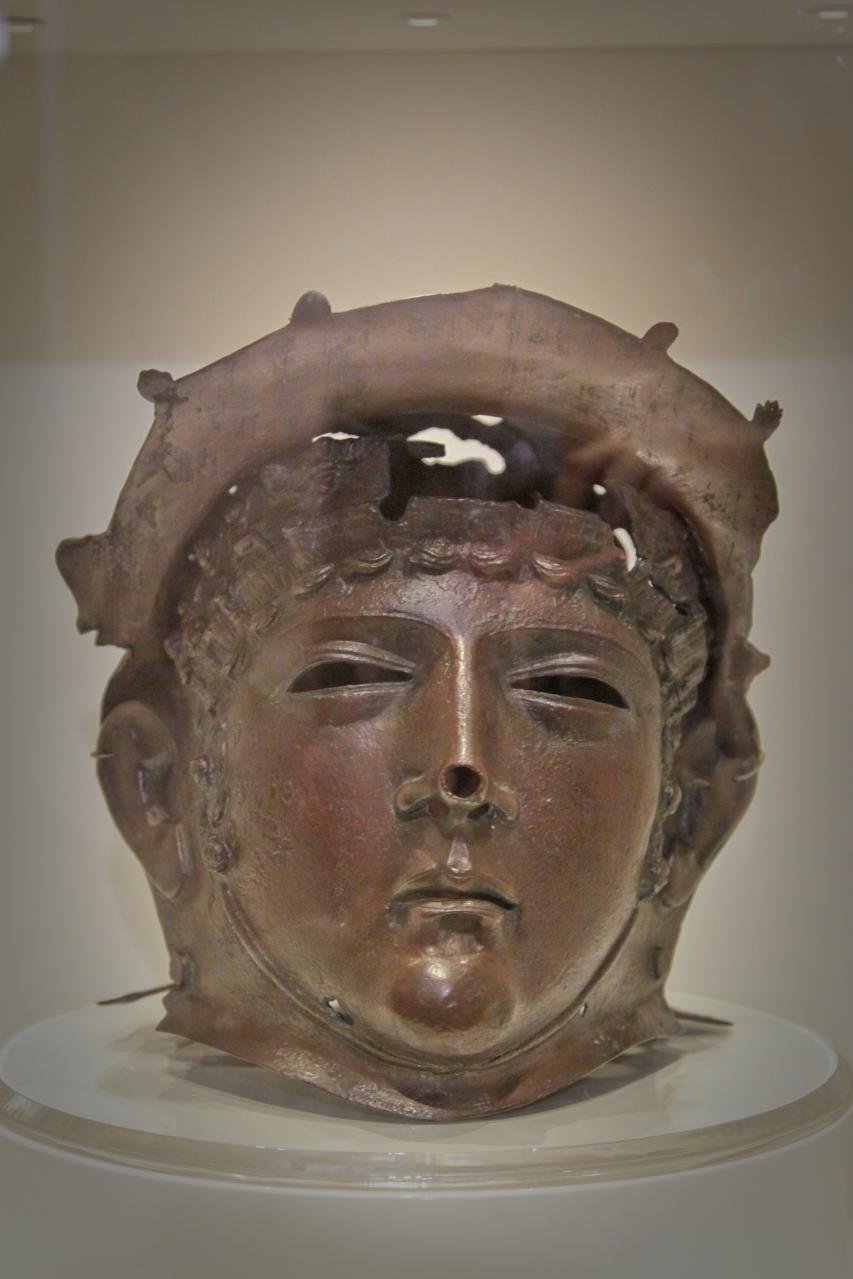
Replica on display at the Ribchester Roman Museum

== Importance ==
Only three Roman helmets with a covering over the face have been found in Britain. Prior to the 2010 discovery of the Crosby Garrett Helmet and the 1905 discovery of the Newstead Helmet this helmet was described as the highest quality helmet found. The Ribchester helmet was found corroded but, like the Newstead helmet, largely complete, whereas the Crosby Garret helmet was found in 67 fragments.

It is known that these helmets were used for display because of accounts left by Arrian of Nicomedia, who was a governor in the time of Emperor Hadrian. Arrian describes how soldiers of high rank or with particular skills were allowed to wear these helmets in the hippika gymnasia or cavalry tournaments.

The helmet was voted Britain's "second best Roman find", behind the Vindolanda tablets, according to a web site poll by the Channel 4 television programme Time Team.
