= Stydd =

Coordinates: 53.8195°N 2.5270°W

The manor of Stydd is in the county of Lancashire. It is situated on the north eastern edge of the village of Ribchester. It has three notable buildings: St Saviour's Church, a set of almshouses and the Church of Saint Peter and Saint Paul.

== Notable buildings ==
St Saviour's Church. The Church's founding is obscure but it was well established by the time of the Knights Templar or Knights Hospitaller with whom it is most closely associated. The Church is joined with Saint Wilfrid's in Ribchester and is open for worship during the summer. A detailed history has been written by Sir Peter Openshaw and can be found on the Saint Wilfrid's church web site.

Ribchester Almshouse stands near the entrance to Saint Peter and Paul's Church. Built by the Shireburn family in the 1728 they were built to house poor people of the parish.

The Roman Catholic Church of Saint Peter and Saint Paul's is an early 'barn church' built to look like a barn to disguise its true purpose.

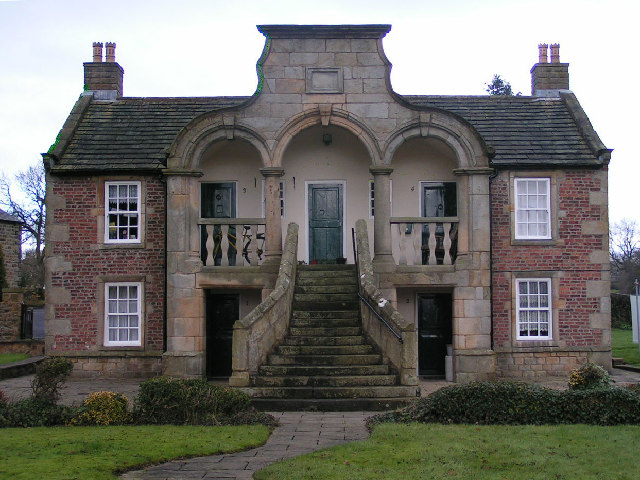
Ribchester Almshouse at Stydd

Saint Peter and Saint Paul's Roman Catholic Church.

== Sources ==
- Historic England, "Almshouses, Ribchester (1308488)", National Heritage List for England
- Hartwell, Clare; Pevsner, Nikolaus (2009) [1969], Lancashire: North, The Buildings of England, New Haven and London: Yale University Press, ISBN 978-0-300-12667-9
