= Listed buildings in Clayton-le-Dale =

Clayton-le-Dale is a civil parish in Ribble Valley, Lancashire, England. It contains five listed buildings that are recorded in the National Heritage List for England. One of these is at Grade II*, the middle grade, and the others are at Grade II, the lowest grade. The parish contains the village of Clayton-le-Dale and surrounding countryside. The listed buildings consist of houses, a former toll house, and a bridge.

== Key ==
Grade	Criteria
II*	Particularly important buildings of more than special interest
II	Buildings of national importance and special interest

== Buildings ==
Name and location	Photograph	Date	Notes	Grade
Showley Hall; 53.79841°N 2.52122°W	—	17th century (probable)	The house is in rendered sandstone and brick, and has a stone-slate roof. It is in two storeys, and has one mullioned window, the others being modern. The doorcase has attached Ionic columns and an entablature with a cornice and an open moulded pediment. On the gables are ball finials.	II
New Hall; 53.81389°N 2.51470°W		1665	A sandstone house with a stone-slate roof in an L-shaped plan with three storeys. It has a symmetrical front, with a central three-storey porch flanked by a gabled bay on each side. The outer and inner doorways have chamfered surrounds, and the outer door has an inscribed lintel. Over the first floor window is a panel carved with a dog. The windows are mullioned. On the left side of the house is a 19th-century single-storey porch.	II*
Showley Fold Farmhouse and disused house 53.78903°N 2.51276°W	—	1747	A pair of houses at right angles to each other, the disused house being the older. They are in sandstone with roofs of slate and stone-slate. Both houses have two storeys, and a central two-storey gabled porch flanked by one bay on each side. The older house has one sash window, the other windows being mullioned. Its doorway has a quoined surround and an inscribed lintel. The farmhouse has French windows and one mullioned window. Its doorway has a Tudor arched head.	II
Ribchester Bridge; 53.81593°N 2.51435°W		1774	The bridge carries the B6245 road over the River Ribble. It is in sandstone, and consists of three segmental arches on triangular cutwaters. The bridge has a string course and a solid parapet.	II
Oaks Bar; 53.79687°N 2.50203°W		Early to mid 19th century	A former toll house in sandstone with a slate roof in a single storey. It has a two-bay face, and a canted end. The windows have round heads, and there is a large lunette window.	II
