= Club Day =

Club Day, also known as Gala Day or Field Day, is an annual community celebration, common in rural communities in North West England, during which clubs, churches and other organizations process and gather for various activities such as competitions for fancy dress, arts and crafts, cooking, and produce.

Many of these events originated in processions of the churches and some have, or have had, a strong agricultural background.

Most villages hold club events on the same weekend each year to avoid conflicting with neighbouring villages.

The events often have at their centre a Rose or Field Day Queen. These are young girls, selected for the year, whose duties include the official opening of the event and a central role in any procession. In some villages, such as Ribchester, the Field Day Queen is responsible for opening other village events.

== Gallery ==
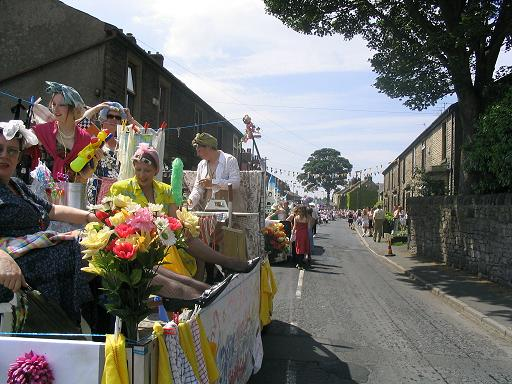
Ribchester Field Day procession

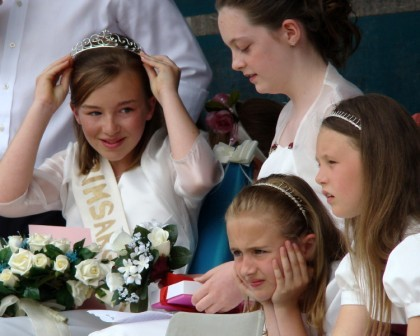
The Crowning of Grimsargh's Rose Queen

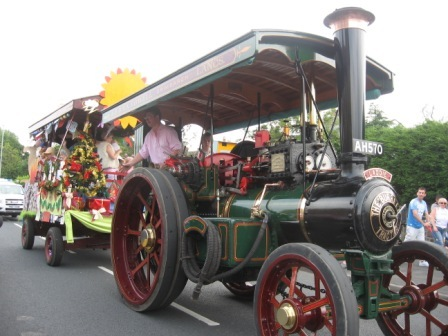
A steam engine joins the Grimsargh Field Day parade

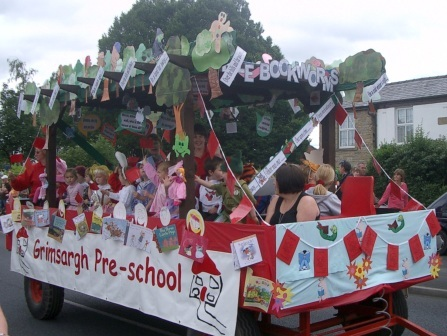
Grimsargh Parade
