= Bremetennacum =

Ruins of a Roman fort in Ribchester, England

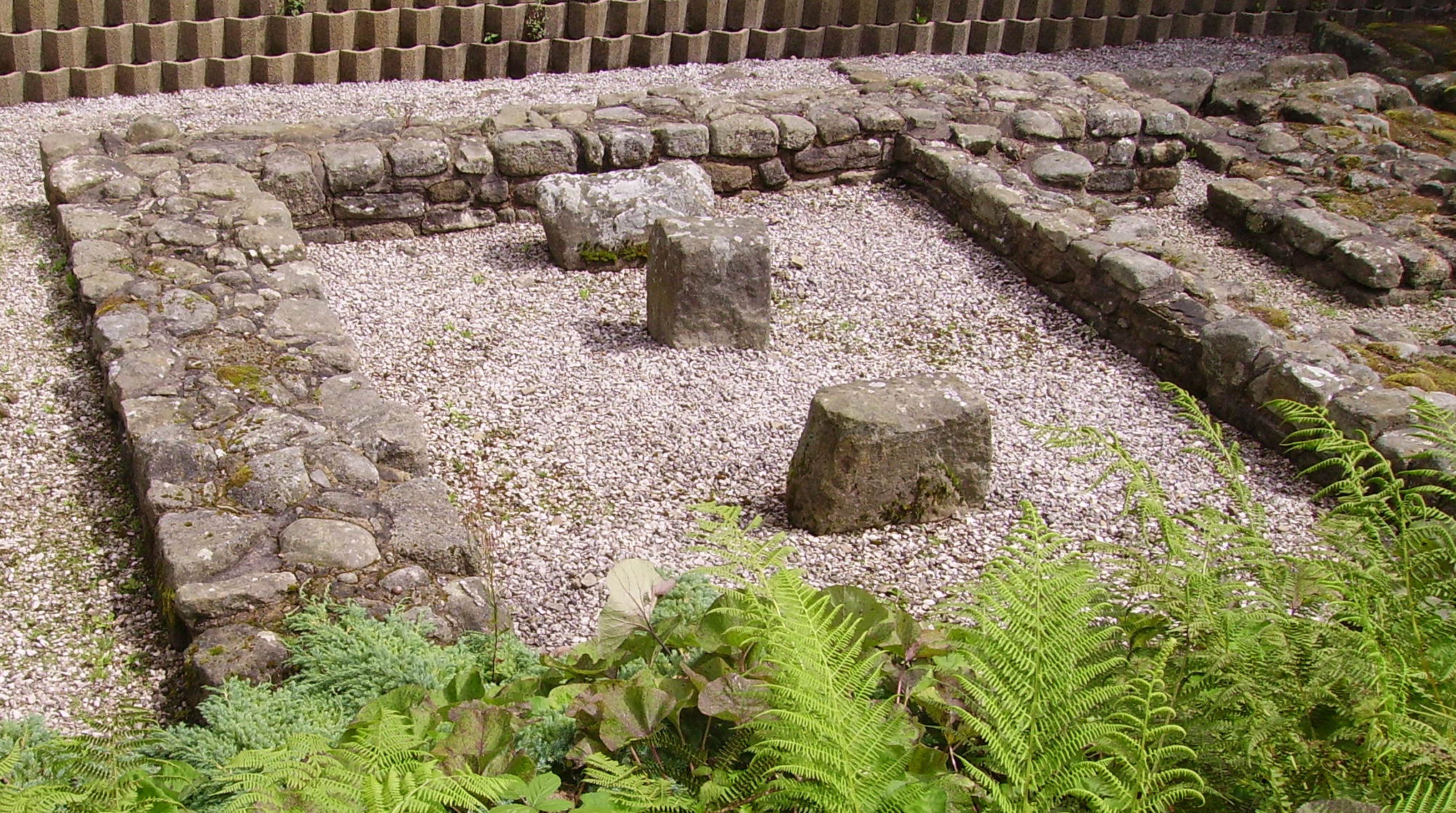
- Roman ruins in Ribchester

- Location within the Borough of Ribble Valley

General information
- Architectural style: Roman fort
- Location: Ribchester, Lancashire, England
- Coordinates: 53.81035°N 2.530828°W
- Completed: 72/3

Scheduled monument
- Official name: Ribchester Roman fort (Bremetennacum)
- Reference no.: 1005110

Bremetennacum, ([brɛmɛˈteːnːakʊm]), or Bremetennacum Veteranorum, was a Roman fort on the site of the present day village of Ribchester in Lancashire, England (grid reference SD650350). (Misspellings in ancient geographical texts include Bremetonnacum, Bremetenracum or Bresnetenacum.) The site is a Scheduled Monument.

The site guarded a crossing-point of the River Ribble. The first known Roman activity was the building of a timber fort, believed to have been constructed during the campaigns of Petillius Cerialis around AD 72/3. This was replaced by a stone fort in the 2nd century. For most of its existence the fort was garrisoned by Sarmatian auxiliaries, first stationed in Britain by Marcus Aurelius in 175. Prior to that it is suggested that the fort was garrisoned by the Ala II Asturum from Spain, but there is some uncertainty about this. Pottery evidence indicates that the fort was occupied for most of the 4th century until the end of the Roman period.

A recreation of Templeborough Roman Fort in Yorkshire. It was rebuilt in stone in the 2nd century and covered an area of 2.2 hectares (5.5 acres), similar to Bremetennacum

== History ==
The first fort was built in timber in AD 72/73 by Legio XX Valeria Victrix. The fort was renovated in the late 1st century AD and was rebuilt in stone in the early 2nd century. During the life of the fort, a village grew up around it. A fort remained at Ribchester until the 4th century AD and its remains can still be seen around the present village.

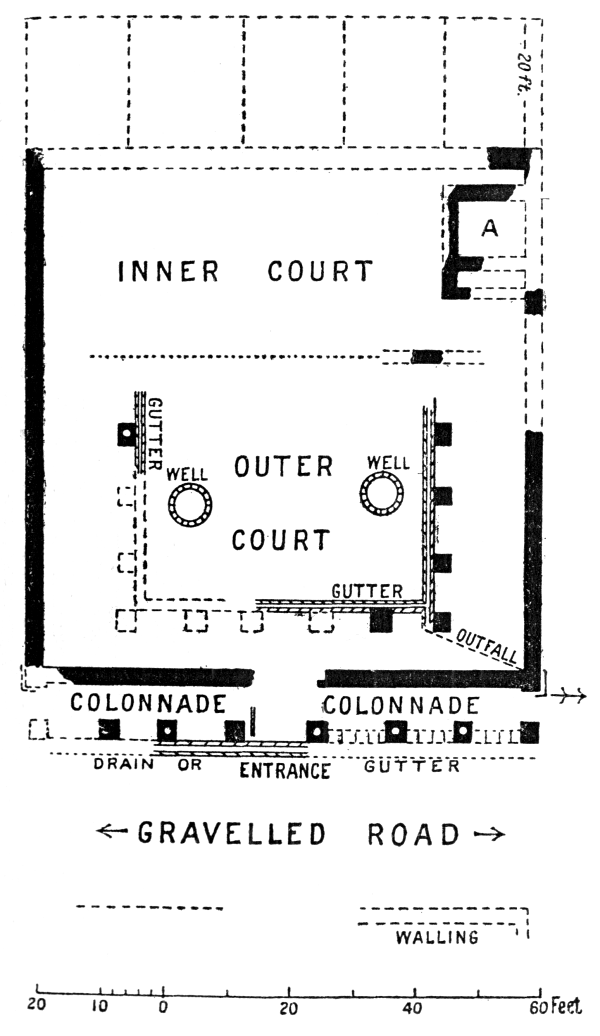
Plan of the principia at Ribchester Fort

A report on Roman remains at Ribchester was published by Francis Haverfield in Roman Britain in 1914:

In the spring of 1913 a small school-building was pulled down at Ribchester, and the Manchester Classical Association was able to resume its examination of the Principia (praetorium) of the Roman fort, above a part of which this building had stood. The work was carried out by Prof. W. B. Anderson, of Manchester University, and Mr. D. Atkinson, Research Fellow of Reading College, and, though limited in extent, was very successful.

The first discovery of the Principia is due to Miss Greenall, who about 1905 was building a house close to the school and took care that certain remains found by her builders should be duly noted: excavations in 1906-07, however, left the size and extent of these remains somewhat uncertain and resulted in what we now know to be an incorrect plan. The work done last spring (1913) makes it plain (see illustration) that the Principia fronted — in normal fashion — the main street of the fort (gravel laid on cobbles) running from the north to the south gate. But, abnormally, the frontage was formed by a verandah or colonnade: the only parallel which I can quote is from Caersws, where excavations in 1909 revealed a similar verandah in front of the Principia. Next to the verandah stood the usual Outer Court with a colonnade round it and two wells in it (one is the usual provision): the colonnade seemed to have been twice rebuilt. Beyond that are fainter traces of the Inner Court which, however, lies mostly underneath a churchyard: the only fairly clear feature is a room (A on plan) which seems to have stood on the right side of the Inner Court, as at Chesters and Ambleside. Behind this, probably, stood the usual five office rooms.

If we carry the Principia about twenty feet further back, which would be a full allowance for these rooms with their walling, the end of the whole structure will line with the ends of the granaries found some years ago. This, or something very like it, is what we should naturally expect. We then obtain a structure measuring 81 × 112 feet (34 m), the latter dimension including a verandah 8 feet (2.4 m) wide. This again seems a reasonable result. Ribchester was a large fort, about 6 acres (24,000 m^{2}), garrisoned by cavalry; in a similar fort at Chesters, on Hadrian's Wall, the Principia measured 85 × 125 feet (38 m): in the 'North Camp' at Camelon, another fort of much the same size (nearly 6 acres), they measured 92 × 120 feet (37 m).

The most famous artifact discovered in Ribchester, and dating from the Roman period, is the Ribchester Helmet, an elaborate Roman cavalry helmet. The helmet was discovered, part of the Ribchester Hoard, in the summer of 1796 by the son of Joseph Walton, a clogmaker. The boy found the items buried in a hollow, about 10 feet below the surface, on some waste land by the side of a road leading to Ribchester Church, and near a river bed. In addition to the helmet, the hoard included a number of patera, pieces of a vase, a bust of Minerva, fragments of two basins, several plates and some other items that Townley thought had religious uses. The finds were thought to have survived so well because they were covered in sand.

== Culture ==
=== Diet ===
Evidence for diet was recovered during the excavations in the vicus. Fish include smelt, salmon, eel, grey mullet and plaice/flounder. Animal bones consisted of cattle, sheep/goat and pig. Several flavourings were found, including coriander and dill.

=== Religion ===
Several altars were discovered from the Roman fort, including ones dedicated to the Matres and Moguns.

=== Death and burial ===
Several funerary inscriptions have been recovered including one dedicated to a decurion.

== Rediscovery of Roman Ribchester ==
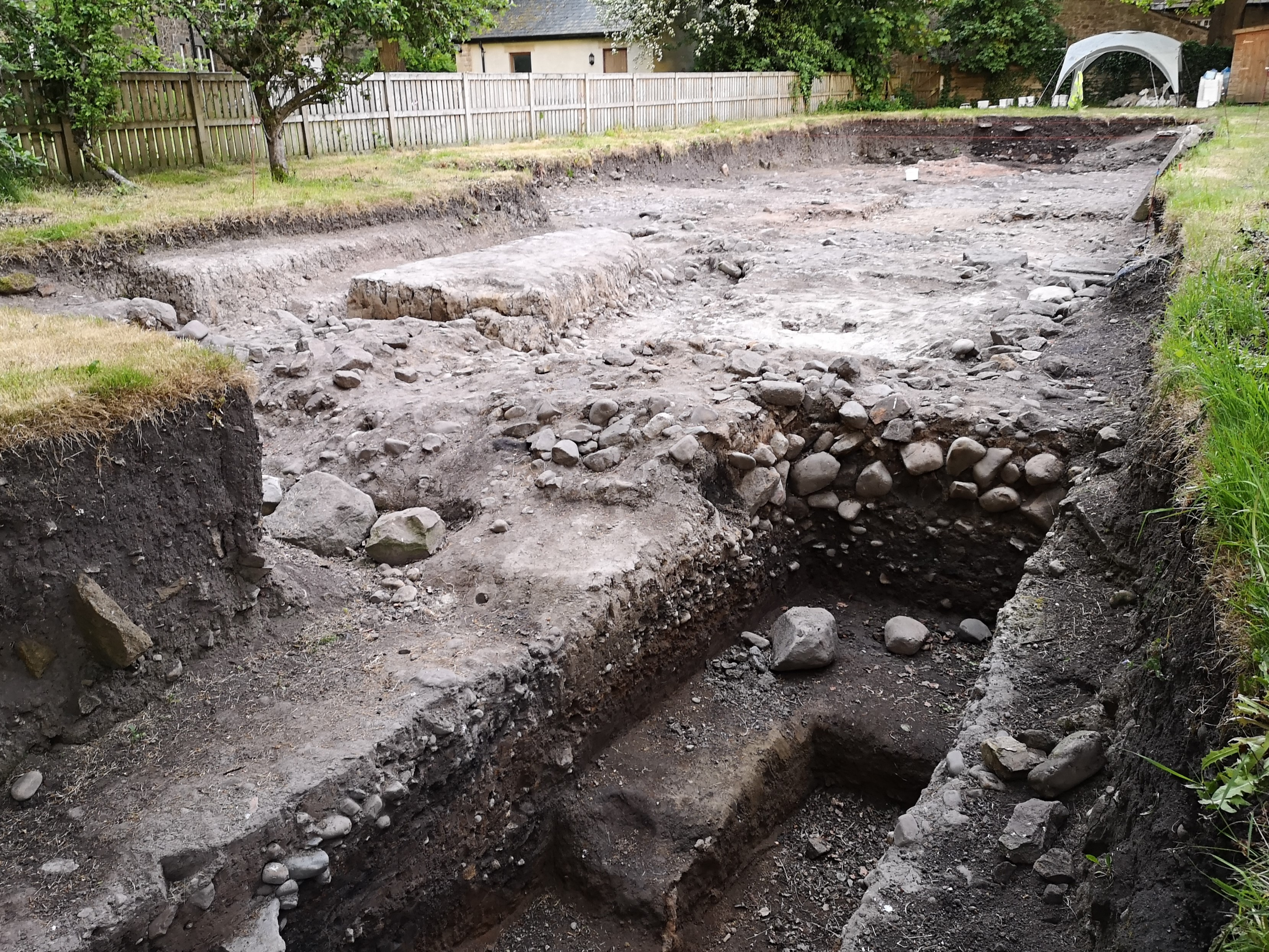
The excavation site near the granaries in 2019.

Several antiquarians recorded their visits to Ribchester, including John Leyland, William Camden, and William Stukeley. Excavations began in the nineteenth century, with those undertaken by Thomas May and Donald Atkinson recovering the outline of the fort. The granaries were excavated in 1908, including the discovery of a layer of charred cereal grain. The Manchester Classical Association excavated part of the Principia in 1913, reported by Haverfield in 1914. Private excavations were undertaken in 1967 of a bath house. Excavations were undertaken in 1980 in the vicus. Ribchester featured in series one of Time Team. Along with the archaeologists, the Ermine Street Guard were also present; they reenacted the construction of a turf rampart using authentic Roman tools. The University of Central Lancashire undertook excavations during the 2010s in the area of the north gate of the auxiliary Roman fort.

In 1993, the first episode of Time Team that was recorded excavated the back garden of 2 Church Street in which a sizeable section of the fort's remains are preserved.

== Archaeological remains ==
=== Visible remains ===
- Ribchester Roman Museum, opened in 1915.
- Roman bath house

== See also ==
- Ribchester Helmet
- Scheduled monuments in Lancashire
