= 48 Church Street, Ribchester =

Building in Ribchester, England

48 Church Street
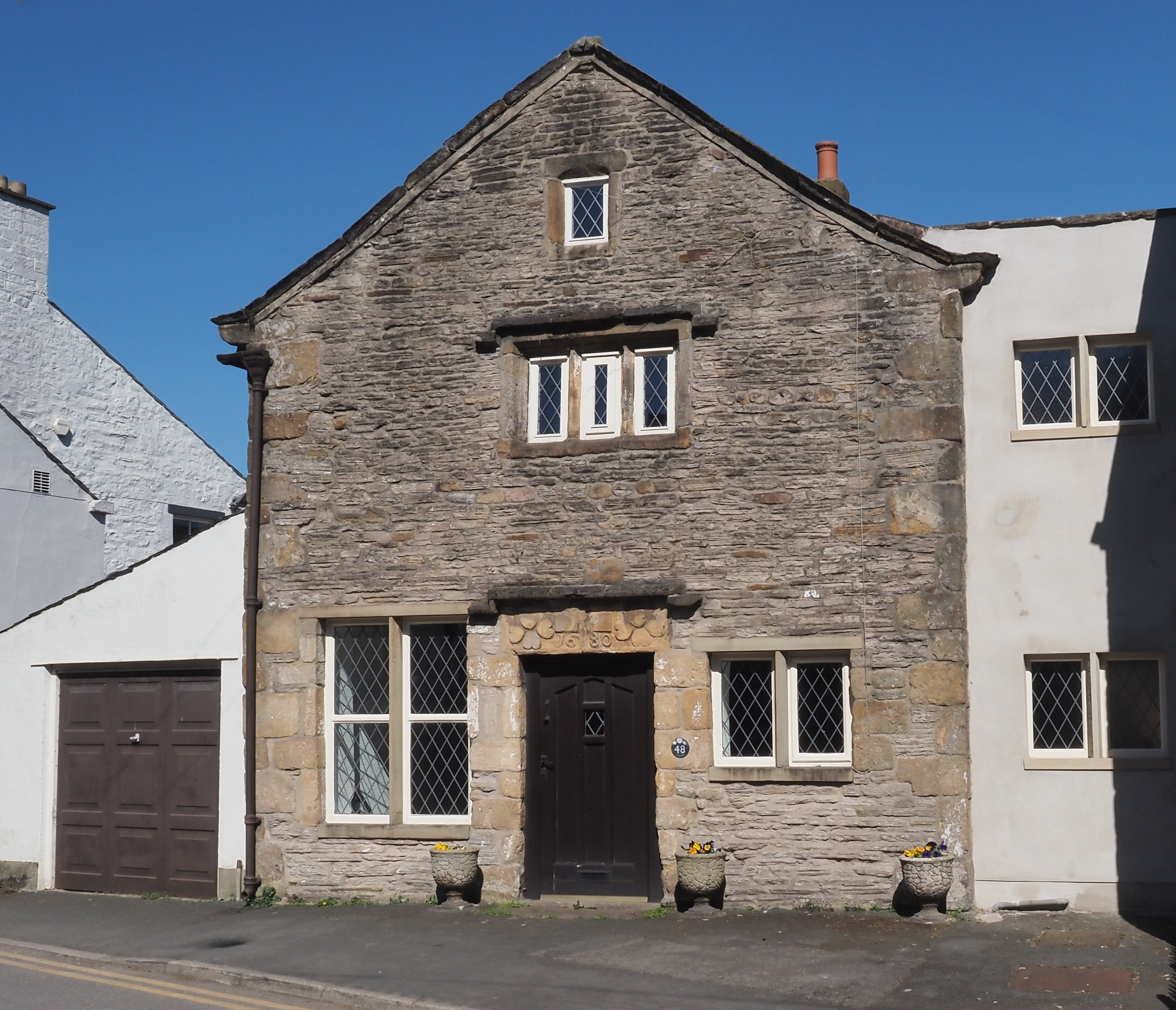
- Pictured in 2025
- Interactive map of 48 Church Street
- Location: 48 Church Street, Ribchester, Lancashire, England
- Coordinates: 53.81293°N 2.53337°W
- Built: 1680 (346 years ago)

Listed Building – Grade II
- Designated: 11 November 1966
- Reference no.: 1308510

48 Church Street is a building on Church Street in Ribchester, Lancashire, England. The property dates to 1680 and is now Grade II listed.

It is a sandstone house with a slate roof, in two storeys with attics, and with the gable end facing the street. In the centre is a doorway with long-and-short jambs, and a lintel carved with the date and with heart motifs. The ground-floor windows are modern, in the upper floor is a three-light mullioned window, and in the attic is a one-light window. To the left is a modern garage.
