= William Walton (footballer) =

English footballer

Personal information
- Full name: William Ewart Walton
- Date of birth: 7 July 1871
- Place of birth: Ribchester, England
- Date of death: 1929 (aged 57–58)
- Position: Full back

Senior career*
Years	Team	Apps	(Gls)
1892–1893	Clitheroe		
1893–1894	Fleetwood Rangers		
1894–1896	Blackburn Rovers	5	(1)
1896	Park Road (Blackburn)		
Total		5	(1)
- * Club domestic league appearances and goals

William Ewart Walton (7 July 1871–1929) was an English footballer who played in the Football League for Blackburn Rovers.
