= Clayton-le-Dale =

Village in Lancashire, England

Coordinates: 53.7966°N 2.4935°W

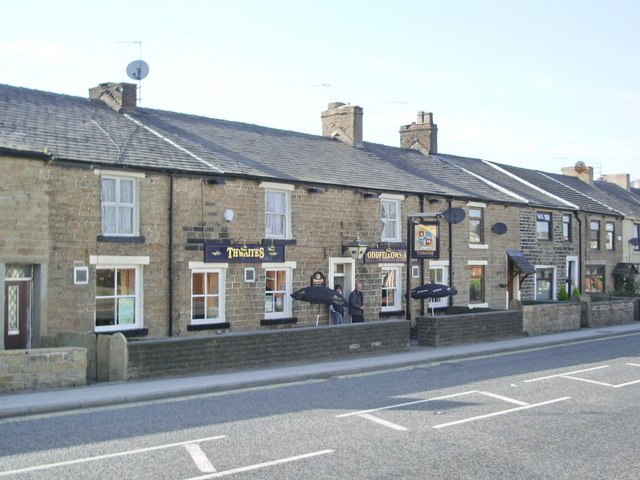
- Oddfellows Arms

- Shown within Ribble Valley Location within Lancashire
- Population: 1,228 (2011)
- OS grid reference: SD6733
- Civil parish: Clayton-le-Dale
- District: Ribble Valley
- Shire county: Lancashire
- Region: North West
- Country: England
- Sovereign state: United Kingdom
- Post town: BLACKBURN
- Postcode district: BB1
- Dialling code: 01254
- Police: Lancashire
- Fire: Lancashire
- Ambulance: North West
- UK Parliament: Ribble Valley

Clayton-le-Dale is a village and civil parish situated on the A59 road near Blackburn, in Lancashire, England. The population of the civil parish as of the 2011 census was 1,228. The village is in the Ribble Valley local government district.

The parish is mainly agricultural. Since the foot-and-mouth crisis in 2001 local businesses have started to diversify; for example Dowsons started making ice cream on their dairy farm and supplying Asda and Booths supermarkets, as well as producing unusual flavours of ice cream including black pudding flavour.

Other examples of diversification in Clayton-le-Dale include tourism, and the development of industrial units in the village with Fairfield Business Park giving home to companies such as Ski & Trek, Evabel Ltd, Paul Case Furniture, and Mellor Cars.

== See also ==
- Listed buildings in Clayton-le-Dale
- Ribchester Bridge
