= Chris Haines (reenactor) =

British historical reenactor

Chris Haines MBE
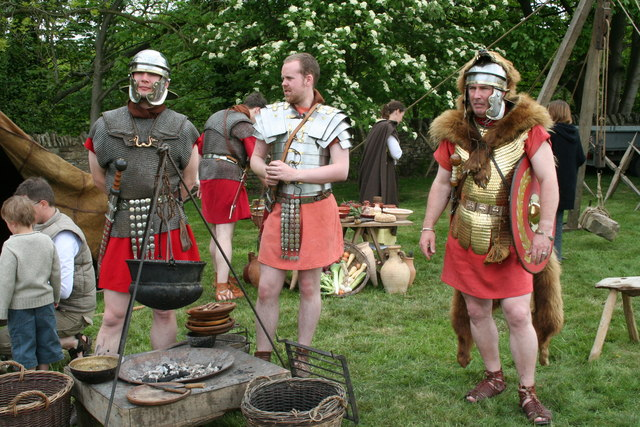
- Haines (right) at Bolsover Castle in 2007
- Born: Christopher Haines; 1944 (age 81–82)
- Occupation: historical reenactor
- Years active: 1995–present
- Children: 2

Christoper Haines (born 1944) is an historical reenactor and the founder of the Ermine Street Guard in 1972.

== Life and career ==
Haines was originally a farmer in his native Gloucestershire. In 1972, he was asked to take part in a pageant at St Mary's Church in Great Witcombe, Gloucestershire. He formed a group for the occasion, and he went on to establish it as the Ermine Street Guard shortly thereafter. As of 2007, it had sixty members. He is now its chairman, in addition to his role as the Guards' centurion Lucius Flavius Aper, of the Legio II Augusta.

Haines was awarded an MBE in 2007, at the age of 63.
