= 2 Church Street, Ribchester =

2 Church Street is a building in Ribchester, England

2 Church Street
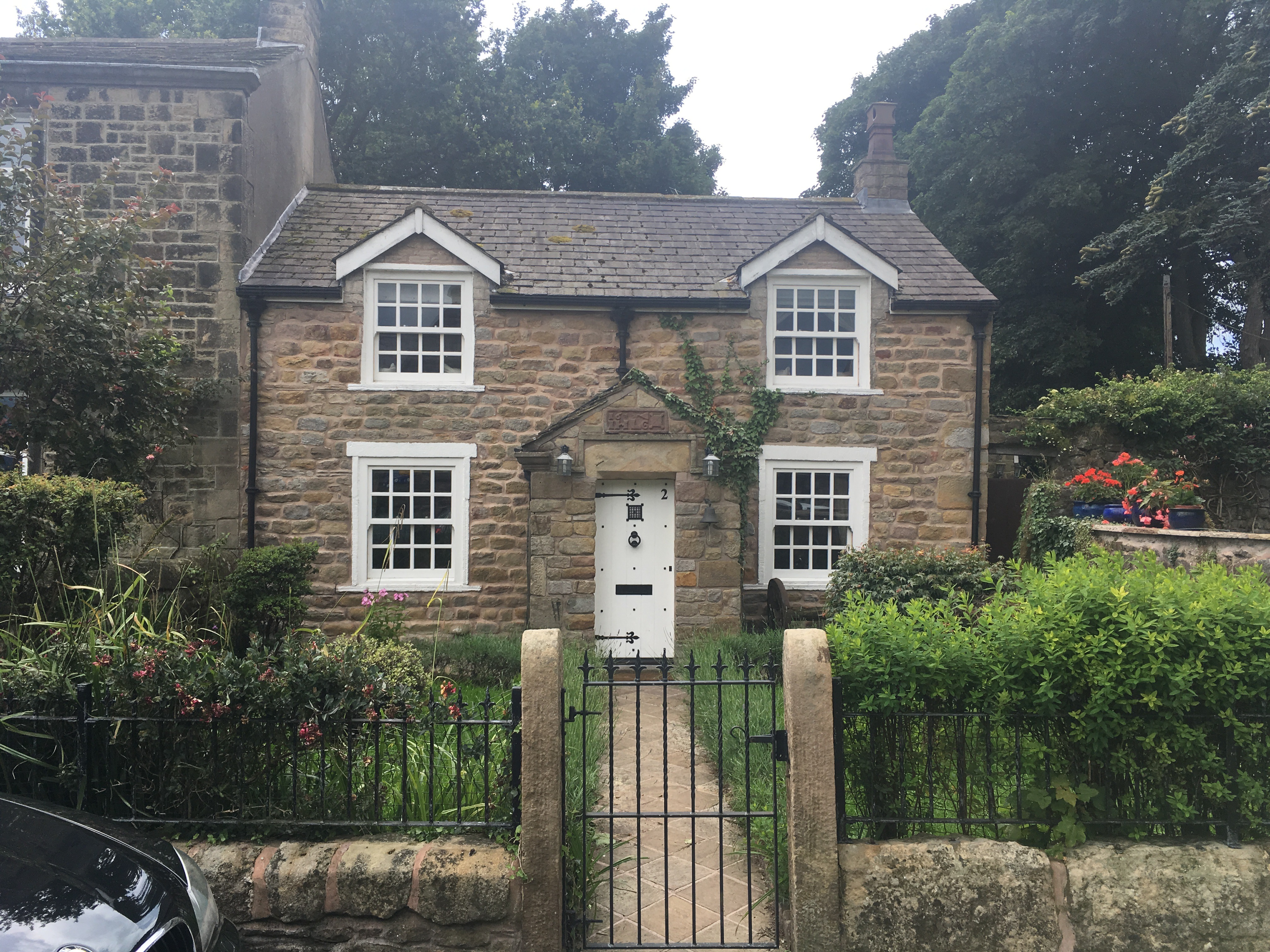
- The building in 2017

- Location within Lancashire 2 Church Street, Ribchester (England)

General information
- Location: 2 Church Street, Ribchester, Lancashire, England
- Coordinates: 53.81112°N 2.5320°W

Technical details
- Floor count: 2

2 Church Street is a building in Ribchester, Lancashire, England. The property dates to at least the 19th century. In the 1970s, it was discovered that the northeastern corner of a Roman fort, centred in the immediate area, is located on the property. The fort, named Bremetennacum Veteranorum, is now a scheduled monument. A sod-and-clay rampart had existed before the fort was constructed.

The rear of the property was originally partially excavated during the 1970s, when a cobblestoned surface and a stone corner watchtower were discovered; it was then covered with a plastic sheet in an attempt to preserve them.

== 1993 Time Team excavation ==
The back garden of the property was excavated during a three-day visit from Time Team between 3 September and 5 September 1993, the first episode filmed for the series. It was aired on 23 January 1994 as the second episode.

The home's owner at the time was Jim Ridge, the honorary curator of the village's Roman museum, in whose honour a gallery is named. Ridge was a history teacher at Broughton and then Fulwood High Schools. Having lived in the cottage since 1977, he knew when he purchased the property that there was part of the fort there, so he wrote to Time Team informing them of its substantial remnants. He also believed that his cottage was built almost entirely from rubble from the stone rampart.

Phil Harding undertook Time Team's excavation, during which evidence was discovered of a wooden watchtower, pre-dating the stone structure.

Jim Ridge, in front of his cottage on 3 September 1993, reading the letter he wrote to Time Team. Ridge died on 21 January 2003

Phil Harding and Jim Ridge above the remnants of the fort in the property's back garden, which was initially excavated in the 1970s. Looking east

== 2006 excavation ==
A planning application for a two-storey extension at the rear of the cottage was submitted in 2006. A watching brief of the groundworks was requested by Lancashire County Archaeological Service (LCAS) to the local planning authority due to the high archaeological content in the vicinity.

Twelve timbers were discovered, lying aligned southwest-to-northeast, varying in thickness from 0.04 metres (1.6 in) to 0.1 metres (3.9 in). They were set roughly 0.1 metres (3.9 in) to 0.12 metres (4.7 in) apart. They were waterlogged and, therefore, in good condition; two had been cut or had decayed in situ, however. The depth of the timbers was significant enough that they, it was believed, would not be disturbed by the construction as the current plans stood. Timbers had also been found during similar work undertaken next door at Riverside House (1 Church Street) the previous year, although those had shown more signs of having had work done to them.

In all, 22 artefacts (or fragments thereof) were recovered during the investigation, split between Romano-British pottery and more modern material. The majority of them were pottery from the 19th century and later. Two animal bones were also found.
