= Church Street, Ribchester =

Historic street in Ribchester, England

Church Street
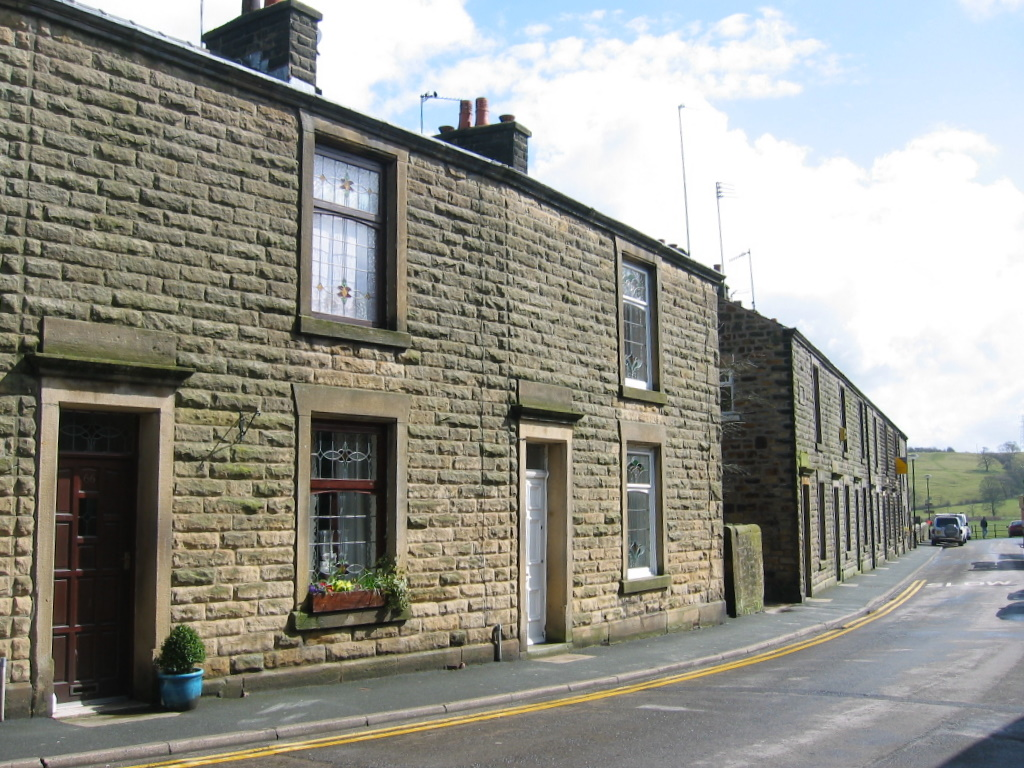
- Looking south along Church Street towards the River Ribble
- Interactive map of Church Street
- Length: 0.37 mi (0.60 km)
- Location: Ribchester, Lancashire, England
- North end: Ribchester Road (B6245)

Church Street is an historic street in the English village of Ribchester, Lancashire. Named for St Wilfrid's Church, which is located near the southern end of the street, Church Street runs for about 0.37 miles (0.60 km), from its junction with Ribchester Road (the B6245), to the north, to its terminus on the western banks of the River Ribble, to the south of Ribchester's village centre. Several of its buildings date to the 17th century.

== Notable locations ==
From north to south

- 48 Church Street, Grade II listed building
- 28 and 29 Church Street, Grade II listed buildings
- 2 Church Street, built partly on a Roman fort
- Riverside House, 1 Church Street
- Ribchester Roman Museum
- St Wilfrid's Church
