= Ermine Street Guard =

British classical reenactment society

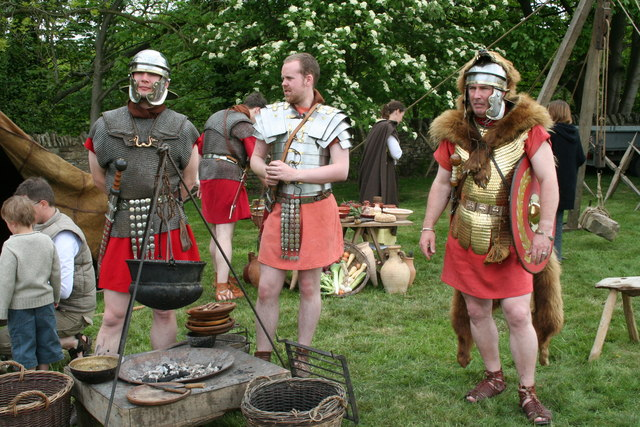
Members of the Guard in 2007

The Ermine Street Guard is a British classical reenactment and living history society, founded in 1972 by Chris Haines. Its main objective is to study and display weapons, tactics and equipment of the Roman army of the first Century AD. It was named after Ermine Street, a major Roman road from London to Lincoln and York.

== History ==
In 1972, a reenactment group was formed under the name Ermine Street Ghosts, to help fund the restoration of the Witcombe and Bentham village hall. Initially, clothing and armour was manufactured for an eight men contubernium and the troop marched and performed for a crowd of 2500. After the fundraiser requests came in for attendances at other events. A society was formed, more people joined and additional equipment was manufactured. Presently the society numbers some 50-60 members, from all over England and Wales. Nearly all of those are men, because no women are allowed to perform male roles for reasons of historical accuracy. In 2012 the society raised some £25,000 for the refurbishing of the village hall it was founded to help.

== Authenticity ==
From the onset it was decided that clothes, weapons and equipment would have to look as historically accurate as possible, though at first the materials used were hardly that. Over the years the Guardsmen became more passionate about authenticity and nowadays the Ermine Street Guard is known for a certain perfectionism in this. Weapons and equipment are nearly all made by hand, using much the same tools and methods the Romans did, when possible. Over the years the society has remade much of its armour and equipment because research had proven the old ones not quite authentic. Consequently the society is frequently asked to pose for, or take part in more serious activities, like research and publications.

== Activities and equipment ==
The Ermine Street Guard gives performances at archaeological or historical sites and events, in museums and in schools. Guardsmen are occasionally asked to perform in films or other media. The society takes part in practical research of Roman methods of manufacturing and operating artillery and other equipment. Scientific understanding of the Roman soldier's body armour, the lorica segmentata was helped by the activities of the Guard.

The Ermine Street Guard also owns tents, cooking utensils, a ballista, a heavy crane and an onager, all as historically accurate as possible.
