= St Wilfrid's Church, Ribchester =

St Wilfrid's Church
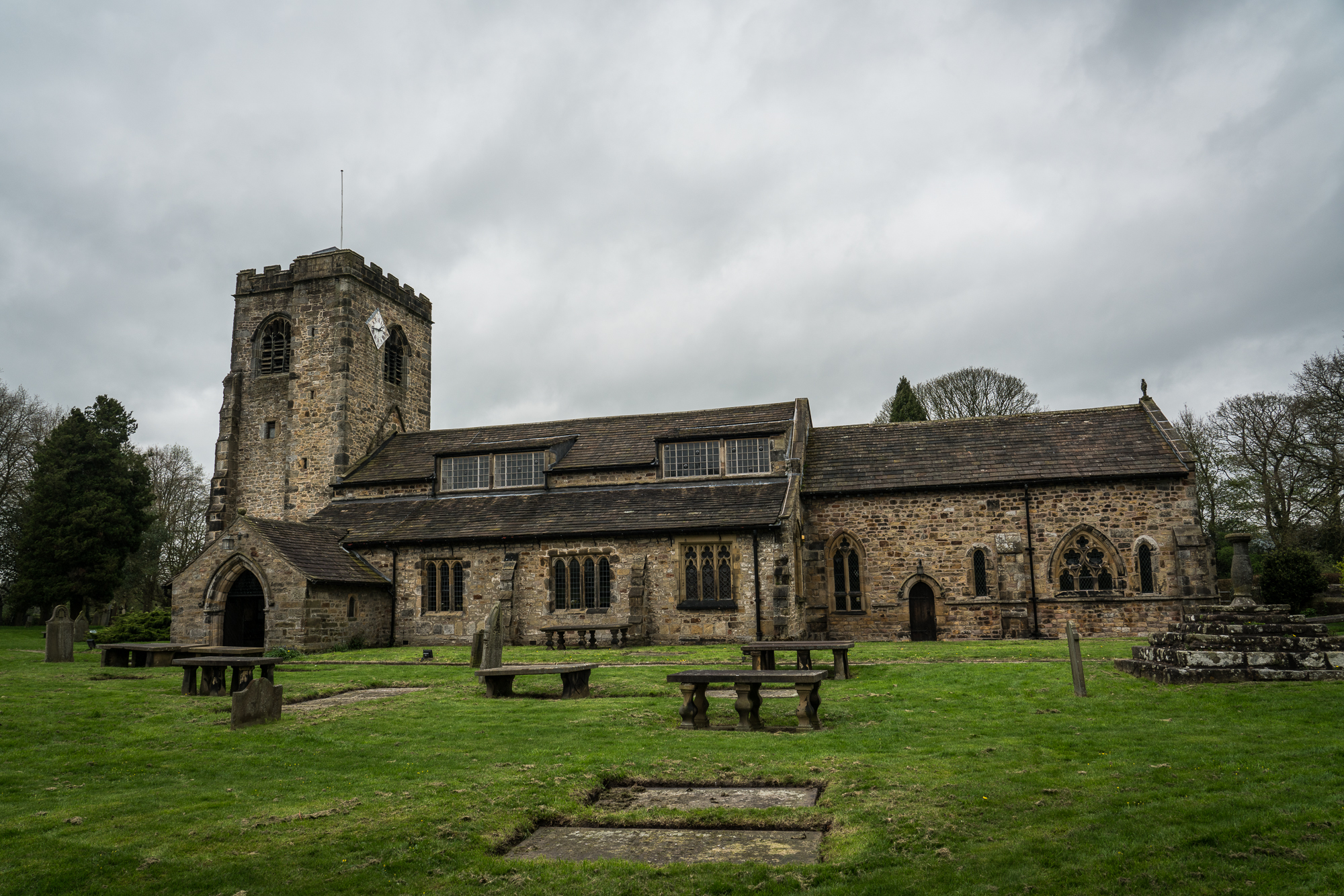
- Pictured in 2024

- Location in the Borough of Ribble Valley
- St Wilfrid's Church
- 53.8103°N 2.5332°W
- OS grid reference: SD 64983 35019
- Location: Ribchester, Lancashire
- Country: England
- Denomination: Anglican
- Website: www.saintwilfrids.org.uk/

History
- Status: Parish church

Architecture
- Functional status: Active
- Heritage designation: Grade I
- Designated: 11 November 1966

Administration
- Province: York
- Diocese: Blackburn
- Archdeaconry: Lancaster
- Deanery: Preston

St Wilfrid's Church is an Anglican church in the village of Ribchester in Lancashire, England, which is situated close to the site of a Roman fort. It is an active parish church in the Diocese of Blackburn. It is recorded in the National Heritage List for England as a designated Grade I listed building.

== History ==
St Wilfrid's dates from the 13th century, built on a site close to that of a Roman fort, Bremetennacum. A chapel and porch were added in the 14th century. A tower was added to the west in the late 15th century. In the 16th century, the roofs were removed in order to increase the height of the chancel walls and new windows were added to the aisle wall. Major repairs to the building took place in 1685–6 and 1711. A west gallery was added in 1736. The church underwent restoration in 1881 that included the rebuilding of the north wall of the chancel.

In November 1966, it was designated a Grade I listed building. The Grade I listing is for buildings "of exceptional interest, sometimes considered to be internationally important". St Wilfrid's is an active Anglican parish church in the Diocese of Blackburn, the Archdeaconry of Lancaster and the Deanery of Preston.

== Architecture ==
=== Exterior ===
The church is constructed of sandstone rubble and has roofs of stone slate. Its plan consists of a nave with a south aisle, chancel, south porch, north chapel and west tower. There is a vestry to the north of the chancel. The tower, of three stages, has angled buttresses and battlements. It has three-light belfry louvres.

=== Interior and fittings ===
The nave measures 61 feet (19 m) by 24 feet (7.3 m). and has four bays. The south arcade has pointed arches of two chamfered orders and octagonal piers with moulded caps and bases. The north arcade has two bays; its arches also have two chamfered orders. There is an octagonal buttressed baptismal font of sandstone, possibly dating from the 14th century. It has a flat wooden top that has been painted. The pulpit is octagonal and constructed of oak. Dating from 1636, it is ornate and in the Jacobean style.

The north arcade opens into a chapel called the Dutton Quire. Measuring 34 feet (10 m) by 14 feet (4.3 m), it contains fragments of a wall painting of Saint Christopher from the 14th or 15th century. The south aisle measures 10 feet 6 inches (3.20 m) wide. At its east end, enclosed by an oak screen (probably from the 16th century), is the Hoghton Quire. The nave's west gallery sits on four Tuscan columns of stone.

The chancel measures 40 feet (12 m) by 21 feet (6.4 m); the floor is 6.5 inches (170 mm) lower than the nave floor. The north wall has a chamfered squint, which opens to the outside.

=== Churchyard ===
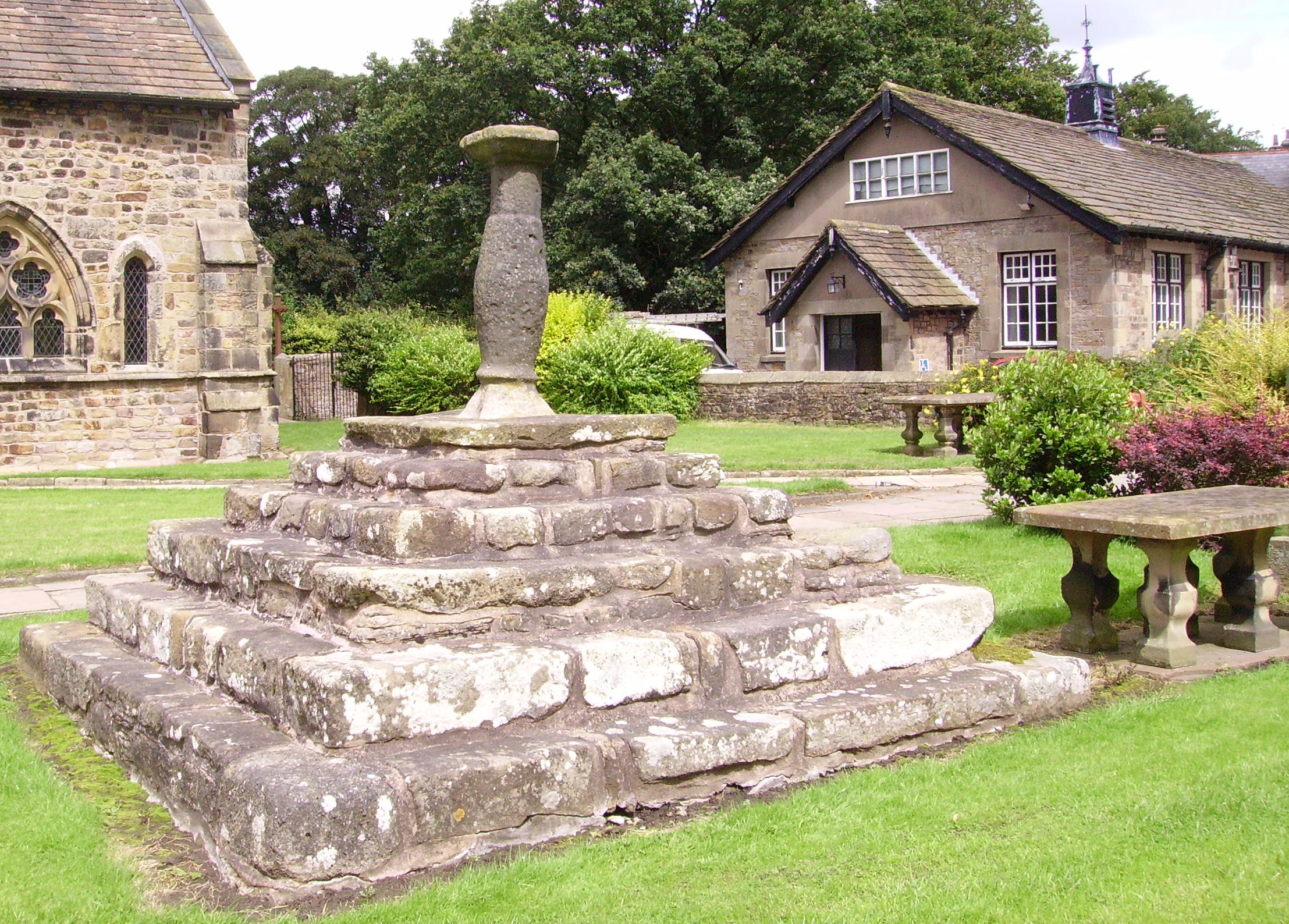
The sandstone sundial south-east of the church

St Wilfrid's is surrounded by a churchyard to the north, south and west; its two gates lie to the south-east. To the east of the building is a rectory, built in 1884 of rubble.

There is a sundial in the churchyard, to the south-east of the chancel. Possibly dating from the 17th century, the base is constructed of sandstone. There are six square steps with a turned column. The column has a cyma moulded capital and is topped by an octagonal brass dial. English Heritage has given the sundial a separate Grade II listing.

The oldest dated gravestone in the churchyard is from 1696 and there is a war grave of a Loyal Regiment soldier of World War I.

== See also ==
- Grade I listed buildings in Lancashire
- Listed buildings in Ribchester
