= Ribchester =

Village in Lancashire, England

Coordinates: 53.813°N 2.532°W

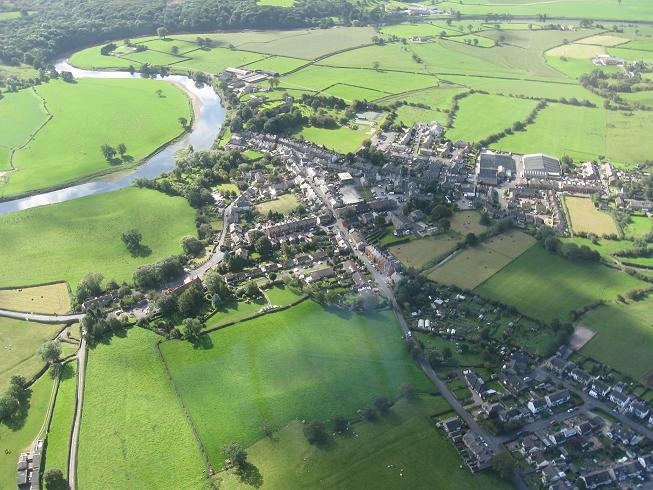
- A 2009 aerial view of Ribchester, looking south

- Shown within Ribble Valley Location within Lancashire
- Population: 1,598 (2011)
- OS grid reference: SD649353
- Civil parish: Ribchester
- District: Ribble Valley
- Shire county: Lancashire
- Region: North West
- Country: England
- Sovereign state: United Kingdom
- Post town: PRESTON
- Postcode district: PR3
- Dialling code: 01254
- Police: Lancashire
- Fire: Lancashire
- Ambulance: North West
- UK Parliament: Ribble Valley

Ribchester (/ˈrɪbtʃɛstər/) is a village and civil parish within the Ribble Valley district of Lancashire, England. It lies on the banks of the River Ribble, six miles (10 km) northwest of Blackburn and twelve miles (19 km) east of Preston.

The village has a long history with evidence of Bronze Age beginnings. It is well known as a significant Roman site being the location of a Roman cavalry fort called Bremetennacum, some parts of which have been exposed by excavation. In common with many towns and villages in East Lancashire its later history was dominated by cotton weaving; firstly in the form of hand-loom weaving and later in two mills. Neither mill still operates and the village is primarily a dormitory village for commuters to the town of Blackburn and the cities of Preston and Manchester.

The main access road into Ribchester is the B6245. From the north-west, this is Preston Road, which merges into Church Street. From the east, it is Blackburn Road, which, at its westernmost extremity, also links up with Church Street, closer to the centre of the village. Stonygate Lane, which runs to the north, partially follows the route of the old Roman road into Ribchester.

== History ==
=== Bronze Age ===
Excavations at Parsonage Avenue led to the discovery of a circular ditch dating to the Bronze Age circa.1300BCE, with urns containing cremation remains. While excavating the Roman bath house, evidence pointed to the earliest use of the site in the Bronze Age 'over 4,000 years ago'.

=== Roman history ===
The village was originally established as a Roman auxiliary fort named Bremetennacum or Bremetennacum Veteranorum. The first fort was built in timber in AD 72/73 by the 20th legion. The fort was renovated in the late 1st century AD and was rebuilt in stone in the early 2nd century. During the life of the fort, a village grew up around it. A fort remained at Ribchester until the 4th century AD and its remains can still be seen around the present village.

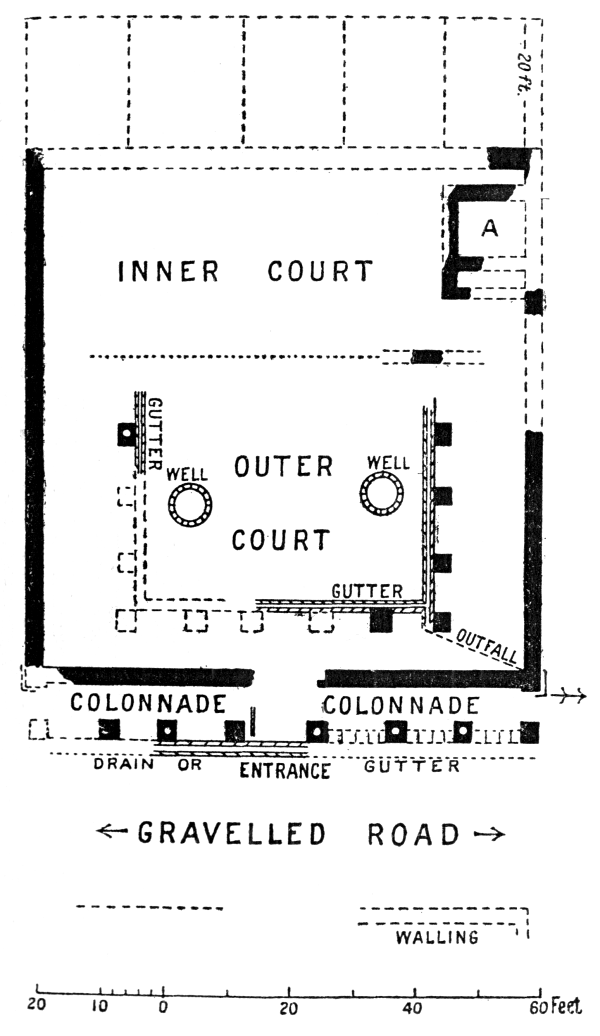
Plan of the principia at Ribchester Fort

A report on Roman remains at Ribchester was published by Francis J. Haverfield in Roman Britain in 1914:

"In the spring of 1913 a small school-building was pulled down at Ribchester, and the Manchester Classical Association was able to resume its examination of the Principia (praetorium) of the Roman fort, above a part of which this building had stood. The work was carried out by Prof. W. B. Anderson, of Manchester University, and Mr. D. Atkinson, Research Fellow of Reading College, and, though limited in extent, was very successful.

"The first discovery of the Principia is due to Miss Greenall, who about 1905 was building a house close to the school and took care that certain remains found by her builders should be duly noted: excavations in 1906-07, however, left the size and extent of these remains somewhat uncertain and resulted in what we now know to be an incorrect plan. The work done last spring (1913) makes it plain (see illustration) that the Principia fronted — in normal fashion — the main street of the fort (gravel laid on cobbles) running from the north to the south gate. But, abnormally, the frontage was formed by a verandah or colonnade: the only parallel which I can quote is from Caersws, where excavations in 1909 revealed a similar verandah in front of the Principia. Next to the verandah stood the usual Outer Court with a colonnade round it and two wells in it (one is the usual provision): the colonnade seemed to have been twice rebuilt. Beyond that are fainter traces of the Inner Court which, however, lies mostly underneath a churchyard: the only fairly clear feature is a room (A on plan) which seems to have stood on the right side of the Inner Court, as at Chesters and Ambleside. Behind this, probably, stood the usual five office rooms. If we carry the Principia about twenty feet further back, which would be a full allowance for these rooms with their walling, the end of the whole structure will line with the ends of the granaries found some years ago. This, or something very like it, is what we should naturally expect. We then obtain a structure measuring 81 × 112 feet (34 m), the latter dimension including a verandah 8 feet (2.4 m) wide. This again seems a reasonable result. Ribchester was a large fort, about 6 acres (24,000 m^{2}), garrisoned by cavalry; in a similar fort at Chesters, on Hadrian's Wall, the Principia measured 85 × 125 feet (38 m): in the 'North Camp' at Camelon, another fort of much the same size (nearly 6 acres), they measured 92 × 120 feet (37 m)."

The most famous artifact discovered in Ribchester, and dating from the Roman period, is the Ribchester Helmet. The helmet, part of the Ribchester Hoard, was uncovered in 1796. The items had been buried in a hollow, about 10 feet below the surface, by the side of a road leading to Ribchester Church. In addition to the helmet, the hoard included a number of patera, fragments of a vas and two basins, a bust of Minerva, several plates and some other items thought to have had religious uses. The finds were thought to have survived so well because they were covered in sand.

=== Post-Roman ===
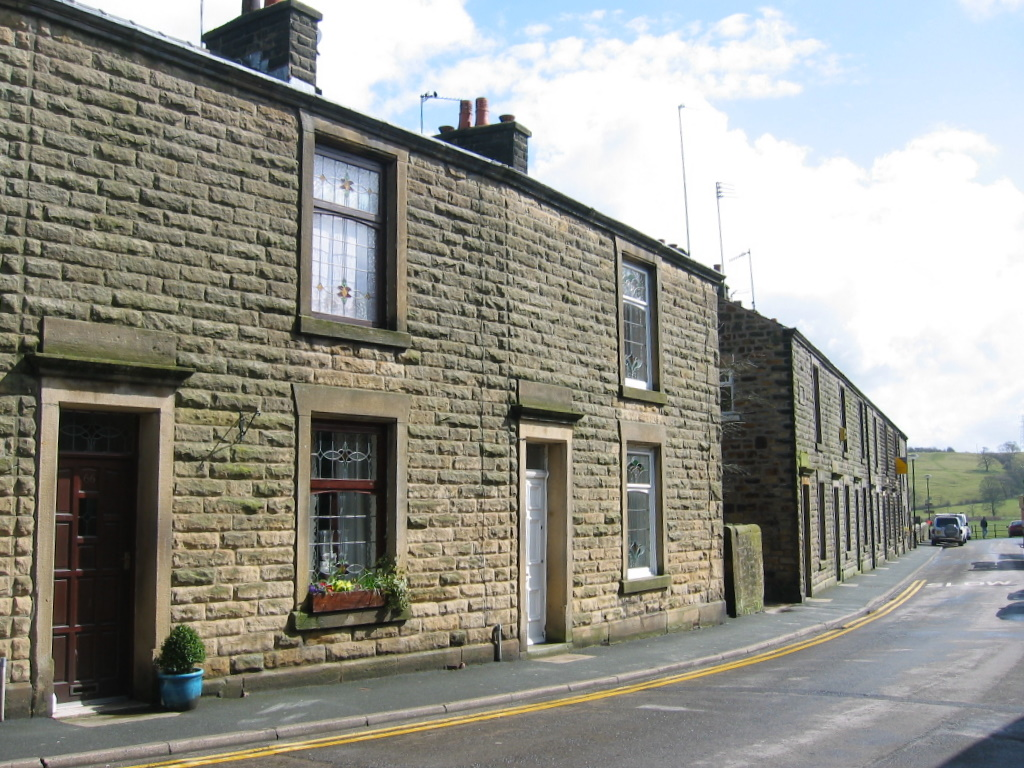
Church Street, looking south towards the River Ribble

"It is written upon a wall in Rome; Ribchester was as rich as any town in Christendom".

Little is known about post Roman Ribchester although the presence of St Wilfrid's Church indicates that it retained some significance. When Henry VIII's antiquary John Leland visited Ribchester in the 1540s he described it thus: "Ribchestre ... hath been an auncient towne. Great squarid stones, voultes and antique coynes be found there". When, a short while later, William Camden, author of Britannia (1586), visited the village, he recorded the saying that starts this section.

That the site of the Roman fort remained the focus of the village is indicated by the later building of St Wilfrid's Church very nearly over the Principia or headquarters area of the Roman camp. The church's website provides a detailed history of both St Wilfrid's and St Saviour's Church, which stands in the nearby settlement of Stydd and which is perhaps a remnant of a Knights Templar or Knights Hospitaller establishment.

In the 17th and 18th centuries the village became, like many in East Lancashire, a centre for cotton weaving. Initially in the homes of the weavers and latterly in two mills (Bee Mill and Corporation Mill) built on Preston Road on the northern edge of the village.

In 1838, William Howitt published his Rural Life of England, in which he described conditions in the weaving districts of East Lancashire. "Everywhere extend wild, naked hills, in many places totally un-reclaimed, in others enclosed, but exhibiting all the signs of neglected spiritless husbandry ... Over these naked and desolate hills are scattered to their very tops, in all directions, the habitations of a swarming population of weavers ... In Ribchester our chaise was pursued by swarms of [these] wooden-shod lads like swarms of flies and were only beaten off for a moment to close in upon you again, and their sisters showed equally the extravagance of rudeness in which they were suffered to grow up, by running out of the houses as we passed and poking mops and brushes at the horses heads. No one attempted to restrain or rebuke them; yet no one of the adult population offered you the least insult; and if you asked the way, gave you the most ready directions, and if you went into their houses, treated you with perfect civility and showed an affection for these little brats that was honourable to their hearts and wanted only directing by a better intelligence. The uncouthness of these poor people is not that of evil disposition, but of pressing poverty and continued neglect".

The weaving of cotton and other textiles continued in Ribchester until the 1980s, when the last weaving business closed in Bee Mill.

The parish was part of Preston Rural District throughout its existence from 1894 to 1974. In 1974, the parish became part of Ribble Valley.

== Geography ==
The village is situated at the foot of Longridge Fell and on the banks of the River Ribble. The solid geography is of thick boulder clay deposits from the River Ribble over Sabden Shale. The area around the village shows signs of the river having moved with obvious terracing caused by the meanders. The River Ribble is prone to extreme spates and this often leads to flooding in Ribchester during the winter months.

== Demography ==
In 2000 the Ribchester Millennium Projects Committee marked the millennium with the publication of a book entitled Ribchester: A Millennium Record. Its main aim was to record events during 2000 but as an adjunct to that it carried out a statistical survey of the village.

The survey, which was conducted in January 2000, collected data from 500 households in the parish of Ribchester and produced data relating to 1,244 people. The following demographic data is drawn from this survey.

The 2001 census for the Ribchester ward gives the following employment statistics:

| Employment | Percentage |
|---|---|
| Full-time | 39.2 |
| Part-time | 12.6 |
| Self-employed | 15.0 |
| Unemployed | 2.0 |
| Student | 6.0 |
| Retired | 16.6 |
| Home | 4.7 |
| Permanently sick | 2.7 |
| Other | 1.3 |

The population taken at the 2011 Census had increased to 1,598.

== Economy ==
The three mills that were the mainstay of the village in the early part of the 20th century are closed. Bobbin Mill, which stood opposite the Ribchester Arms, was demolished, as was Corporation Mill in the 1980s. The other, Bee Mill, is now home to a range of small businesses.

There are three public houses in the village: the White Bull, the Black Bull and the Ribchester Arms, as well as a sports and social club that was the working men's club associated with the mills. There is a small Spar shop, which occupies the site once occupied by the Co-Operative store, and a tea room.

== Landmarks ==
=== St. Wilfrid's Church ===
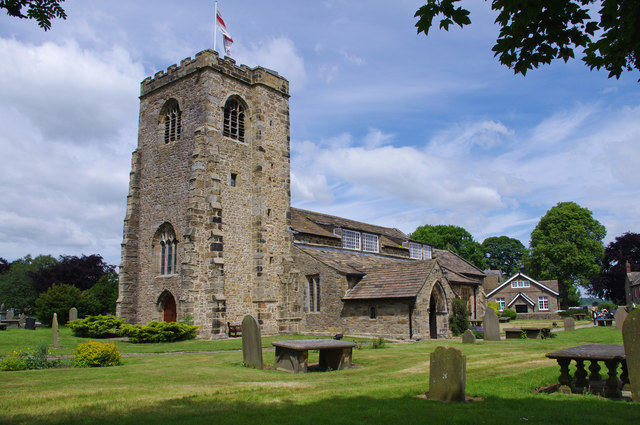
St. Wilfrid's Church

St. Wilfrid's Church stands by the River Ribble on what was the centre of the Roman fort. It is believed to have been founded by St. Wilfrid in the 8th century. The first written record of a church on the site dates from 1193.

=== St. Peter and Paul's Church and Stydd almshouses ===
Although properly in the neighbouring settlement of Stydd, St. Peter and Paul's Church (also known as Styyd Church) is an early barn church. Nearby is the Ribchester Almshouse and the Church of St. Saviour. Over the centuries, this small chapel has been altered several times. The earliest part of the structure is in the north wall. It is an example of transitional Norman work, which indicates that a church stood here during the first part of the 12th century. During the mid-13th century, the chapel was a Camera of the Preceptory of the Order of Newland, near Wakefield. Styyd Church was transferred to the parish of Ribchester in 1545. It was last restored, with assistance from English Heritage, in 2005.

In his will dated 1726, John Sherborne of Bailey left instructions to found "good almshouses on his estate at Stydd for five persons to live separately therein".

=== White Bull public house ===
Located on Church Street, the White Bull dates to 1707.

=== The Hillock ===
This is the ancient centre of the village standing at the "Y" junction where the Roman branch roads lead up Water Street and Stonygate Lane to join the main route from Chester to Hadrian's Wall. It has been used for leisure and relaxation since around the first century. Although the Hillock gives the impression of being a market cross, no evidence exists of this being a part of its history.

=== Weavers' cottages ===
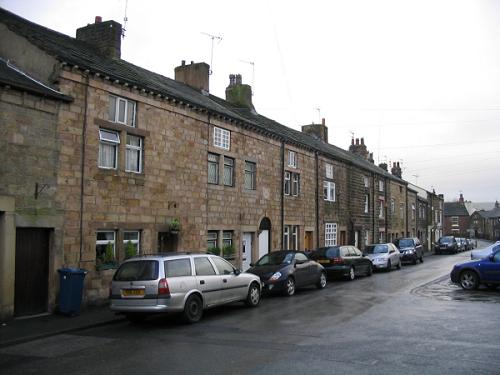
Weavers' cottages on Church Street

Opposite the Hillock are a row of cottages noteworthy for their unusual configuration of windows. Built for the hand loom weavers they have three levels with a single window at the uppermost. Although it is commonly believed that the window in the top level is to illuminate the looms this may not be the case as the weaving would probably have been carried out in the lowest part of the house because of the size of the loom and the need for damp conditions to keep the cotton flexible.

=== Excavated Roman buildings ===
Adjoining the churchyard of St. Wilfrid's Church are the excavated remains of the granaries which belonged to the Roman fort. A short distance east of the village and behind the White Bull pub, are the remains of the Roman baths.

=== Roman Museum ===
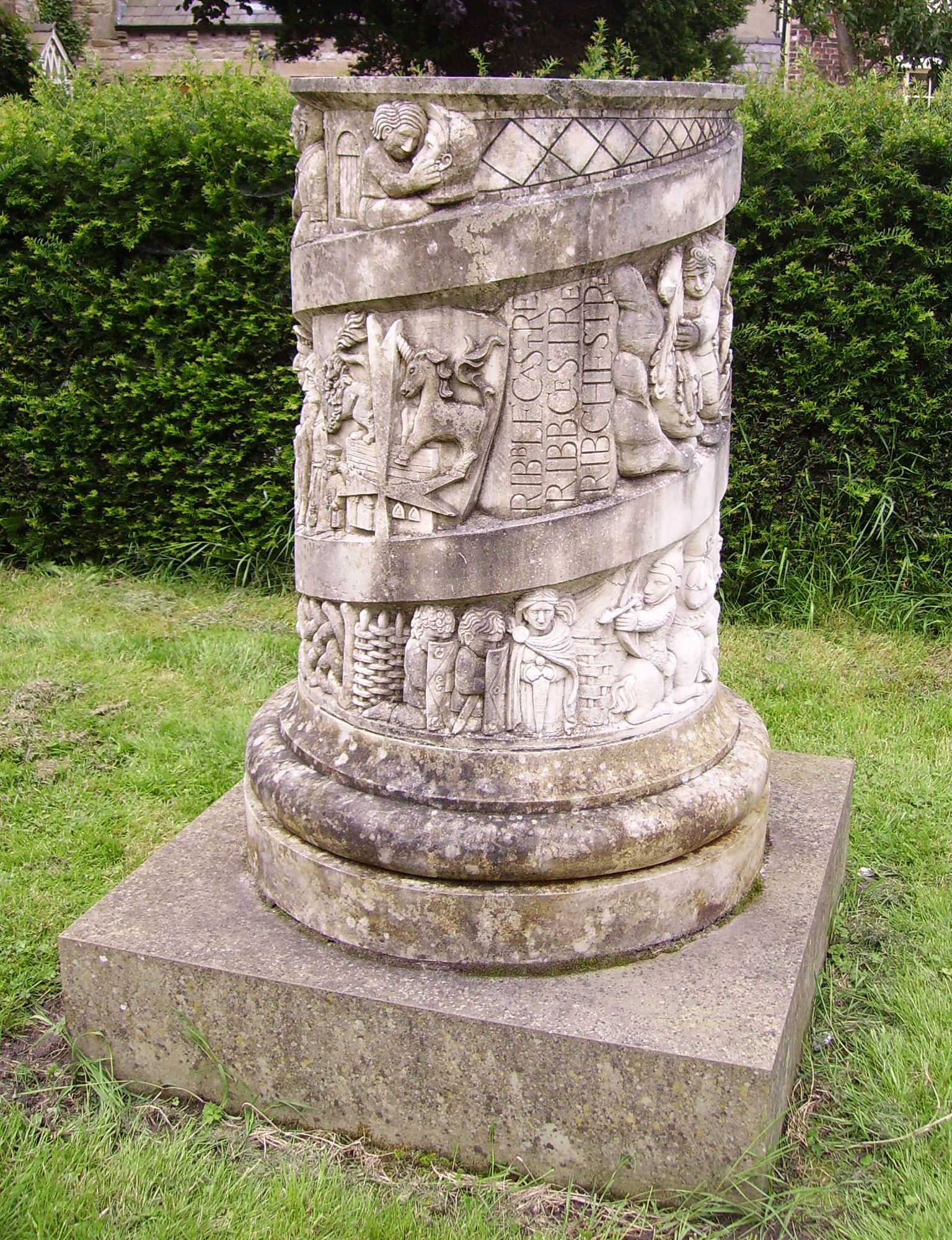
Sculpture modelled on Trajan's Column depicting scenes from Ribchester's history

Near to St. Wilfrid's Church is Ribchester Roman Museum, the brainchild of Margaret Greenall, a member of the Greenall's brewing family, in 1915. The museum houses many of the finds from the Roman fort.

The most famous find, the Ribchester Helmet, is on show in replica, but the original is in the British Museum collection.

=== Stone House ===
Standing just to the east of the Ribchester Arms on Blackburn Road, Stone House was occupied by the owner of the 19th-century Bobbin Mill that used to stand across the road. The mill originally ground corn, with water for power diverted from Boyce's Brook, but it diversified into bobbin turning until 1890, when it closed. The building in front of Stone House was originally a stable for the New Hotel.

== Religion ==
Previous Census returns for Ribchester show that 86.7% of the population expressed themselves to be Christian with the majority of the remaining population professing no religion. In the 2011 Census 78% expressed themselves as Christian. Almost 22% were either no religion or religion not stated doubling the previous results.

There are three places of worship in Ribchester: the Mission Church, the parish church of St Wilfrid's (which incorporates St Saviour's, Stydd), a Church of England church within the Diocese of Blackburn, and St Peter and Paul Church in Stydd, built in 1789, a Roman Catholic church in the Diocese of Salford. The latter's site was carefully chosen because, at the time, it was still illegal for Catholics to have a public place of worship. The church is the last of what are traditionally known as barn churches – others having been altered or demolished.

== Events ==
=== Field Day ===
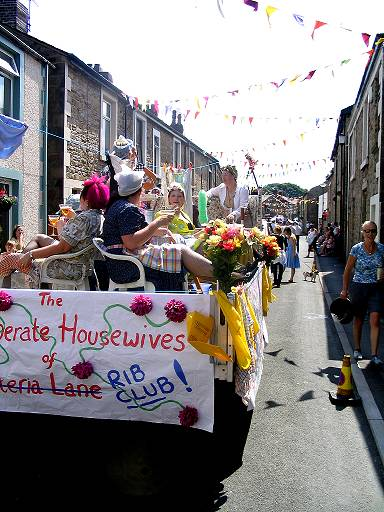
Field Day parade turns up Water Street

On the third weekend of June each year the village celebrates its annual Field Day. Such an event is common to the villages in the area where they are variously known as Club Days or Gala Days. Field Day event marked its 50th anniversary in 2010.

=== May Day Market ===
Each year the village organises a 'May Day Market' on the Spring Bank holiday which is the last Monday in May from 7.00am when most of the village clubs, churches and charitable organisations set up and manage stalls as a means of raising funds to support their activities through the year. The market takes place on the 'Bee Mill' site on Preston Road.

=== Sports and recreation ===
Although Ribchester is a small community it has a number of local sports and recreational groups and facilities. Many of these are focused on playing fields situated to the west of Church Street (alongside a lane called Pope's Croft). These were the gift of a notable local family, the Openshaws. Ribchester Tennis Club has a pavilion and two floodlit hard tennis courts and two junior courts on the playing fields. There is a football pavilion which is the headquarters of Ribchester Football Club. The playing fields also hold a large, well equipped, children's adventure play area.

Ribchester and District Angling Club (RADAC) leases fishing on the rivers Ribble and Hodder in the surrounding area.

Ribchester Amateur Theatre Society (RATS) performs plays and pantomimes in the Parochial Church Hall.

== Notable people ==
- William Walton (1871–1929), footballer
- George Smithies (1906–1980), footballer
- Elli Norkett (1996–2017), rugby player
- Maya Ellis (1988-), Member of Parliament

== See also ==
- Listed buildings in Ribchester
- Ribchester Bridge
