= Main Street, Heysham =

Street in Heysham, Lancashire, England

Coordinates: 54.0465°N 2.9008°W

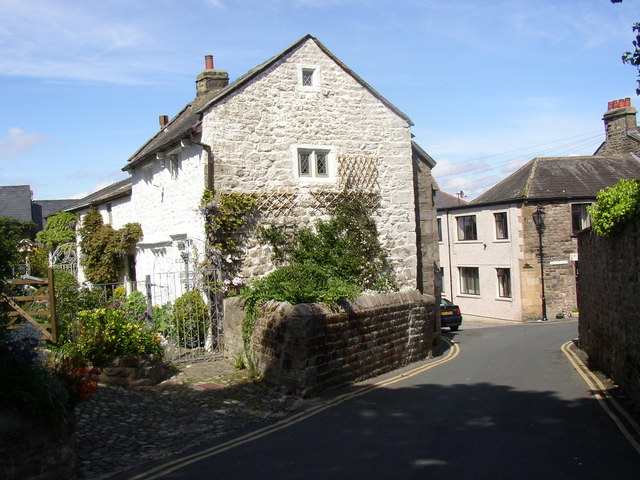

Main Street is a thoroughfare in Heysham, a village in the City of Lancaster district in Lancashire, England. It forms an extension of Crime Well Lane, running first north-westerly past Heysham's village green, then northerly as far as the junction of Bailey Lane with Lade End, almost on the shoreline.

It is the historic centre of the village, its houses, shops and cafes including as they do most of Heysham's 17th- and 18th-century buildings. It also runs past two early-medieval churches, St Peter's Church and St Patrick's Chapel, which, together with their churchyards, have been described as comprising "one of the most interesting [spots] in the country from the archaeological point of view". Every year Main Street hosts the Heysham Viking Festival.

== Historic buildings ==
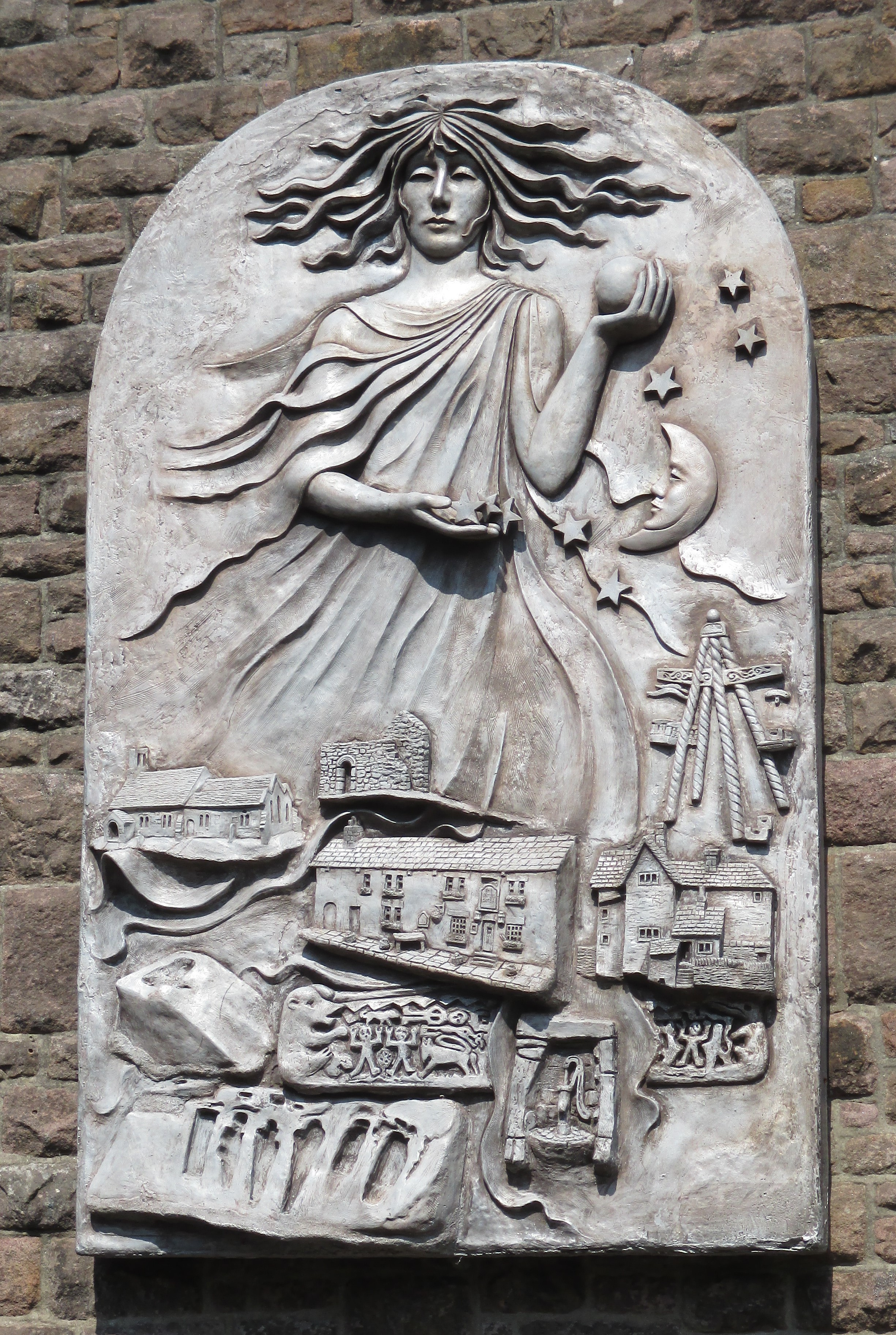
Michael Edwards, The Spirit of Heysham, on Main Street

St Peter's Church, at the northern end of Main Street, is a Grade I listed building. It has some Anglo-Saxon fabric, possibly dating from as early as the 8th or 9th century, but rather more of Decorated and Perpendicular architecture from the later Middle Ages. Its south aisle boasts a pre-Conquest sculpted hogback, which has been brought in from the churchyard. The churchyard features a 19th-century boundary wall, a sundial shaft dated 1696, a medieval stone coffin and a pre-Conquest arch which originally formed the north doorway of the church; each is individually Grade II listed. The ruins of the nearby 8th- or 9th-century St Patrick's Chapel are Grade I listed, as are the rock-cut tombs just outside it; they are also a scheduled monument, so designated for their national archaeological importance.

Outside of St Peter's and St Patrick's, many buildings on Main Street are Grade II listed; most have been stuccoed, pebble-dashed or rendered. Nos 1–5 and no. 19 are 17th-century houses with later alterations, the former group having been originally built as Heysham Rectory in, according to a dated lintel, 1680. Nos. 8, 10, 12, and 40 all substantially date from the 18th century, as in all probability does the Royal Hotel at no. 9. St Patrick's Well, near the churches, may be an 18th-century reconstruction. At nos. 4 and 4A are Manor House and an attached cottage, early 19th-century buildings with some older features.

== Other notable features ==
Heysham Heritage Centre, housed in a 17th-century longhouse-conversion at 24 Main Street, hosts displays and exhibitions illustrating Heysham's history. Heysham Jubilee Institute is a function room located at no. 30. Prominently placed on an outside wall of it is an aluminium relief sculpture by Michael Edwards entitled The Spirit of Heysham (2005–2007), which presents the eponymous figure as a sea-goddess surmounting a selection of the village's antiquities.

== Reference ==
- Hartwell, Clare; Pevsner, Nikolaus (2009). Lancashire North. New Haven, CT: Yale University Press. ISBN 9780300126679.
