= Grade I listed churches in Lancashire =

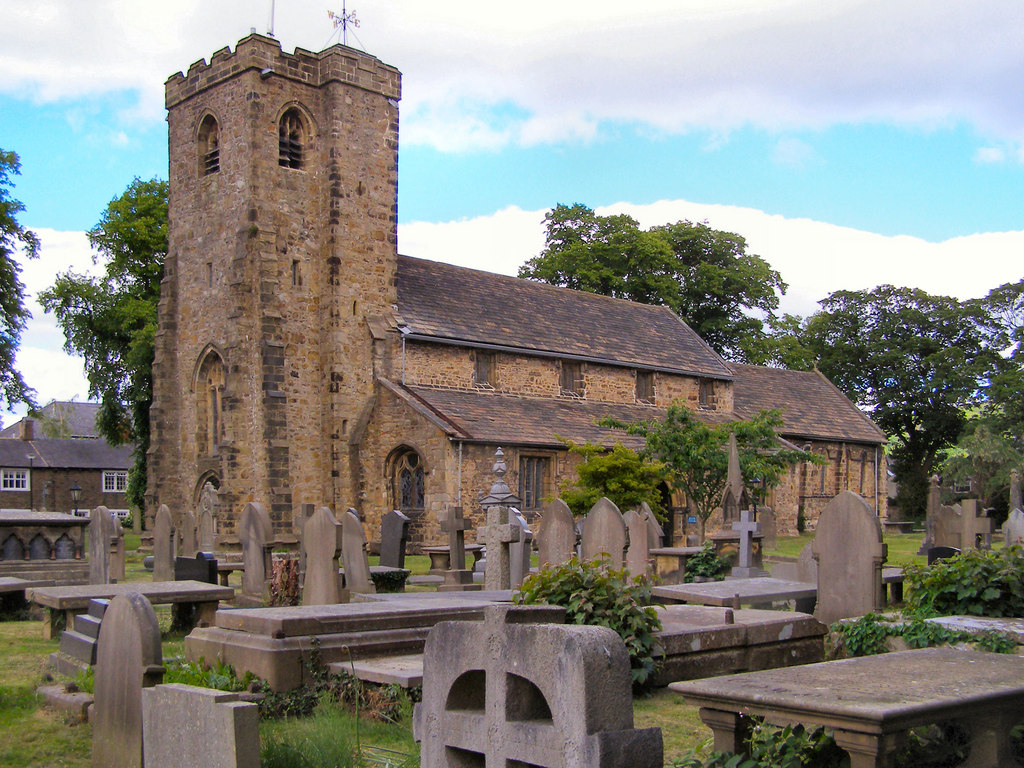
Church of St Mary and All Saints, Whalley

Lancashire is a county in North West England. In 1974 parts of the historic county were divided between Greater Manchester, Merseyside, Cheshire and Cumbria, and part of the West Riding of Yorkshire was transferred into the county, creating the non-metropolitan county of Lancashire. Together with the unitary authorities of Blackburn with Darwen and Blackpool it now forms the ceremonial county of Lancashire.

Buildings in England are given listed building status by the Secretary of State for Culture, Media and Sport, acting on the recommendation of English Heritage. Listed status gives the structure national recognition and protection against alteration or demolition without authorisation. Grade I listed buildings are defined as being of "exceptional interest, sometimes considered to be internationally important"; only 2.5 per cent of listed buildings are included in this grade. This is a complete list of Grade I listed churches and chapels in the ceremonial county of Lancashire as recorded in the National Heritage List for England.

Christian churches have existed in Lancashire since Anglo-Saxon times. Architectural features from that era have survived in St Peter's Church, and in St Patrick's Chapel, both in Heysham; churches such as St Margaret, Hornby, contain Anglo-Saxon fragments in the form of parts of crosses or carved stones. Norman features are found in some of the churches, including St John the Evangelist, Gressingham, and St Saviour, Stydd, but almost all those in the list are Gothic in style. Many were restored during the 19th century and have additions or alterations in Gothic Revival style, including St Bartholomew, Colne, and St Cuthbert, Halsall. All but two of the churches are Anglican by denomination. The two Roman Catholic churches in the list date from the 19th century and are in the Gothic Revival style: Pleasington Priory, and St Walburge, Preston. Most of the county is rural, but remnants of a greater industrial past remain in the larger towns of Preston and Blackburn, and in the former textile towns of east Lancashire. Lancashire's bedrock is mainly sandstone, with limestone deposits in the north and in the area around Clitheroe, which provided the major building materials for the churches.

== Churches ==
Name	Location	Photograph	Notes
St Michael	Aughton; 53.5419°N 2.9198°W	A stone church with a central round tower with clock faces surmounted by an octagonal spire.	St Michael's dates largely from the 14th century, with remains from the 12th and 13th centuries, including a blocked Norman south doorway. The north arcade dates from the 15th century, and the north aisle from the following century. The church was restored in 1876 by W. and J. Hay, who also rebuilt the 16th-century chancel. On the north side of the church is a steeple with a tower, broached to an octagonal bell stage and surmounted by a spire. In a recess inside the north wall of the church is part of an Anglo-Saxon cross-head that has been dated to about 850.
St Mary-le-Ghyll	Barnoldswick; 53.9282°N 2.1644°W	A stone church seen from the south, with a low body and relatively large tower.	The church dates from the 15th–16th century, with fabric remaining from the 13th century. The west tower is dated 1524. Inside is a set of box pews, most from the 17th century, and some from the 19th. There is also a complete 17th-century three-decker pulpit.
St Peter and St Paul	Bolton-by-Bowland; 53.9402°N 2.3267°W	A stone church seen from the southeast, with embattled parapets on the aisle, nave and chancel and on the west tower.	This church dates from the 15th century; the Pudsay Chapel was added in the early 16th century. In 1885–86 the church was restored by Paley and Austin, who replaced the roof of the nave. The parapets of the west tower and the body of the church are all embattled. In the arch between the chancel and the chapel is a memorial to Sir Ralph Pudsay, lord of the manor of Bolton, carved with the figures of himself, his three wives, and his 25 children.
St Michael	Bracewell; 53.9320°N 2.2101°W	A small stone church with simple three-light windows and a west tower.	Although most of the church dates from the 15th or early 16th century there is earlier fabric, including a Norman south doorway and chancel arch. At the west end is an embattled tower. Inside the church, the font is Norman, and the pulpit is Jacobean. The pews were made by Robert Thompson.
St Helen	Churchtown; 53.8788°N 2.7900°W	A stone church seen from the south, with a clerestory and an embattled west tower.	The oldest fabric dates from the 13th century, but most of the church is from the 15th and 16th centuries. It was re-roofed and the clerestory was added in 1811, and the church was restored in 1865–66. At the west end is an embattled tower, and on the south side of the church are a porch and a hearse house. Inside the church, the piscina dates from about 1300. There are wall paintings from the 15th and 17th centuries that were restored in 1986.
St Bartholomew	Colne; 53.8572°N 2.1703°W	A complex stone church seen from the south with a porch, transept, separate clerestories over the chancel and nave, and a west tower.	The church dates mainly from the early 16th century, although the north arcade is from the early 13th century. It is in Perpendicular style. Repairs were made in 1815, and the church was restored in 1889–91 by Paley, Austin and Paley; in the restoration the single north aisle was replaced by a double aisle. Most of the furnishings inside the church are by Paley, Austin and Paley. There are also monuments and brasses dating from the 17th century and later.
All Hallows	Great Mitton; 53.8462°N 2.4339°W	A simple stone church seen from the south, with a west tower.	All Hallows dates from the 13th century, with a west tower added in the early 15th century, and a north chapel in the late 16th century. Inside the church is a west gallery, and a chancel screen incorporating medieval woodwork. In the chancel are a triple sedilia and a piscina. The chapel contains monuments, some with effigies, to the members of the Shireburn family.
St John the Evangelist	Gressingham; 54.1233°N 2.6556°W	Part of a stone church with a round-headed doorway, a two-light window with a pointed arch, and a west tower with a plain parapet.	The church was partly rebuilt in 1734, and incorporates 12th-century fabric. It was restored in 1862 by E. G. Paley. In the south wall of the nave is a Norman doorway, and built into the west wall of the nave is a stone with Saxon carving. There are two more stones with Saxon carving inside the church. Also in the church is a pulpit dated 1714, and box pews.
St Cuthbert	Halsall; 53.5854°N 2.9523°W	A stone church with a west steeple consisting of a square tower, an octagonal drum and spire, the latter with lucarnes.	The chancel dates from the 14th century, and the nave was rebuilt later in the same century. The west steeple dates from the early 15th century. The church was restored in 1873, and again in 1886, by Paley and Austin. The steeple has a square base, an octagonal bell stage, and a spire containing lucarnes. Attached to the south of the tower are the remains of the former grammar school. Inside the church, some of the stalls have misericords, and poppyheads on their bench ends. There is 14th-century stained glass in two of the aisle windows.
St Patrick's Chapel	Heysham; 54.0475°N 2.9027°W	Ruined stone walls with one intact window frame.	This is a ruined chapel dating from the 8th or 9th century. Only the east wall and parts of the north and south walls have survived. It is a scheduled monument. Near the ruins are two groups of rock-cut graves with sockets for markers; each group of graves is listed separately from the church at Grade I.
St Peter	Heysham; 54.0474°N 2.9019°W	A stone church consisting of a nave, a chancel with aisles, each under a separate roof, a south porch, and a west bellcote.	St Peter's was founded in the 8th or 9th century, and retains Saxon features, including a doorway (now blocked) in the west end. There are early Norman capitals in the chancel arch. The rest of the chancel was built around 1340–50, the south aisle was added in the 15th century, and the north aisle in 1864 when E. G. Paley carried out a restoration. In the south chancel aisle is a Viking hogback stone.
St Margaret	Hornby; 54.1114°N 2.6362°W	A elaborately decorated church with embattled parapets and crocketed pinnacles.	A church has been on the site since 1338, but the oldest part of the present church is the tower, built in 1514. The nave was rebuilt in 1817, and the church was restored by Paley, Austin and Paley in 1889. At the west end is an octagonal tower, and at the east end is a semi-octagonal apse. All the parapets are embattled. Inside the church are two fragments of Anglo-Saxon crosses.
Lancaster Priory	Lancaster; 54.0507°N 2.8057°W	The west part of a church with tall windows and a tall four-stage tower.	Most of the fabric dates from the late 14th and the 15th centuries and later, although there are earlier fragments. The west tower was added in 1753–74 by Henry Sephton. Alterations were made to the church in the 19th century. In 1903 Austin and Paley added the south porch and the four-bay King's Own Regiment Chapel on the north side. Inside the church is a west gallery. The furnishings include finely carved canopied stalls dating from about 1340, containing misericords. Also in the church is a collection of Anglo-Saxon carved stones.
St Leonard (old)	Langho; 53.8182°N 2.4556°W	A low small stone church with a south porch and west bellcote.	St Leonard's was built in about 1557, a time when few new churches were being constructed; some of its fabric and fittings are thought to have come from nearby Whalley Abbey. It was restored in 1879, when the west bellcote was added. The church is now redundant and its role has been taken over by a newer church on a different site. The older church is now under the care of the Churches Conservation Trust.
St Wilfrid	Melling; 54.1347°N 2.6165°W	A plain stone church with a clerestory and a west tower.	St Wilfrid's dates mainly from the 15th century, but has retained a window dating from about 1300, and a 14th-century southeast chapel. The church was altered in 1763, when the clerestory was added. It was "modernised" in 1841, and there were further changes later in the 19th century. Fragments of old stones, including part of a carved slab from about the 10th century, are set into the vestry wall. Ten steps inside the church rise from the nave to the chancel, because of the lie of the land. The southeast chapel has an ancient aumbry, and a squint through to the altar.
Pleasington Priory	Pleasington; 53.7350°N 2.5429°W	A stone church with a tall clerestory, polygonal apse, pinnacles and turrets, but no tower.	A Roman Catholic church designed by John Palmer, this was built between 1816 and 1819. A thanks offering by John Francis Butler, it is a large building, without a tower, in Gothic Revival style. The window tracery is based on the Decorated and Perpendicular styles. At the west end is a large rose window, and at the east end is a polygonal apse.
St Walburge	Preston; 53.7629°N 2.7150°W	A church seen from the east with a sandstone polygonal apse, and a very tall limestone steeple.	This is a Roman Catholic church designed by Joseph Hansom. Building started in 1850, and the church opened in 1854. The tower was built in about 1857, to which the spire was added in 1867. The apse, designed by S. J. Nicholl, was built in 1872. The body of the church is constructed in sandstone, and the steeple – one of the highest in England at 309 feet (94 m) – in limestone. In the west front is a large rose window.
St Wilfrid	Ribchester; 53.8103°N 2.5332°W	A stone church with a west tower, and a body of complex design including a porch and large rectangular paned windows in the clerestory.	The church dates from the 13th century, with later additions and alterations. It was restored in 1881, and again after a fire in 1917. The 15th-century west tower is embattled. Inside the church is a west gallery, carried on four Tuscan columns, and box pews, two of which bear the dates 1735 and 1761. In the chancel are a 14th-century piscina and sedilia, and a squint to the exterior of the church. The octagonal pulpit is dated 1636. The north chapel, known as the Dutton Quire, has a 14th or 15th-century wall painting depicting Saint Christopher, and in its east window are fragments of medieval glass.
St Michael	St Michael's on Wyre; 53.8628°N 2.8195°W	The tower of a stone church seen from the west, with a diagonal-shaped clock face, and an embattled parapet.	St Michael's dates mainly from the 15th century, although there is a blocked lancet window in the west end of the church probably from the 13th century. The broad west tower probably dates from 1549, and it is likely that it was raised in height in 1611. On the north side of the church is the Butler Chapel, founded in 1480 and restored in 1797 and 1936. The chapel contains 14th-century glass, and on the north wall of the chancel is a 14th-century wall painting depicting the Ascension.
St Leonard the Less	Samlesbury; 53.7680°N 2.6237°W	A stone church seen from the southeast with at the northwest a tower and a taller stair turret.	The church dates mainly from 1558, when it was rebuilt by the 3rd Earl of Derby, but there is remaining fabric from the late 12th century. The northwest tower and the timber-framed south porches were added in 1899. Inside the church are box pews with dates between 1678 and 1756, two levels of a three-decker 18th-century pulpit, and a set of armour that is believed to have belonged to Thomas Southworth of Samlesbury Hall.
St Andrew	Slaidburn; 53.9642°N 2.4434°W	A plain stone church with a clerestory and a west tower with a plain parapet.	St Andrew's dates probably from the early 15th century, with additions and alterations made later that century, and in the early 17th century. It is constructed in sandstone with a stone slate roof, and has a west tower. Inside the church is woodwork of good quality, including pews from the 17th and 18th centuries, a five-decker pulpit from the 18th century, and a rood screen possibly from the 1630s.
St Saviour	Stydd; 53.8189°N 2.5273°W	A small rectangular building with a porch but no decoration, tower or bellcote.	The church is the only survivor from a group of buildings acquired by the Knights Hospitallers in the late 13th century. Its plan consists of a simple rectangle with a southwest porch. In the north wall are two Norman windows and a doorway. The south doorway is in Early English style, and there are two Perpendicular south windows.
St John the Baptist	Tunstall; 54.1597°N 2.5923°W	A stone church seen from the southwest with an embattled parapet.	The oldest fabric in the church is from the 13th century, but most dates from the 15th century. A vestry was added in 1907. The church is constructed in sandstone with slate roofs. It has north and south aisles, a west tower, and a two-storey south porch. Inside are a 13th-century piscina and sedilia, and a preserved Roman altar.
St Thomas the Martyr	Upholland; 53.5405°N 2.7211°W	A stone church showing the nave with large three-light windows and a west tower.	The nave of the church originated as the east end of the Benedictine Upholland Priory founded in 1319. The west tower was added in the 15th century. In 1882–86 the chancel was added by Basil Champneys. On the north side of the chancel are steps leading down to a crypt that is used as a vestry. Inside the church is a churchwardens' pew dated 1679. The east window contains stained glass designed by Henry Holiday.
St Mary and All Saints	Whalley; 53.8212°N 2.4077°W	A stone church seen from the southeast with an embattled tower, clerestory, and a lower chancel.	The church dates from the 13th century, with alterations and the addition of the west tower in the 15th century. The south doorway is Norman, and there are fragments of Saxon carving in the south wall. Some of the windows are in Early English style and others are Perpendicular; the tower is also Perpendicular. The interior is notable for its wooden carved furnishings. The 15th-century choirstalls were moved from Whalley Abbey, and incorporate misericords and canopies. Other woodwork includes screens, a variety of pews, benches, and the organ case.
