= Austri, Vestri, Norðri and Suðri =

Four dwarfs who hold up the sky in Nordic mythology

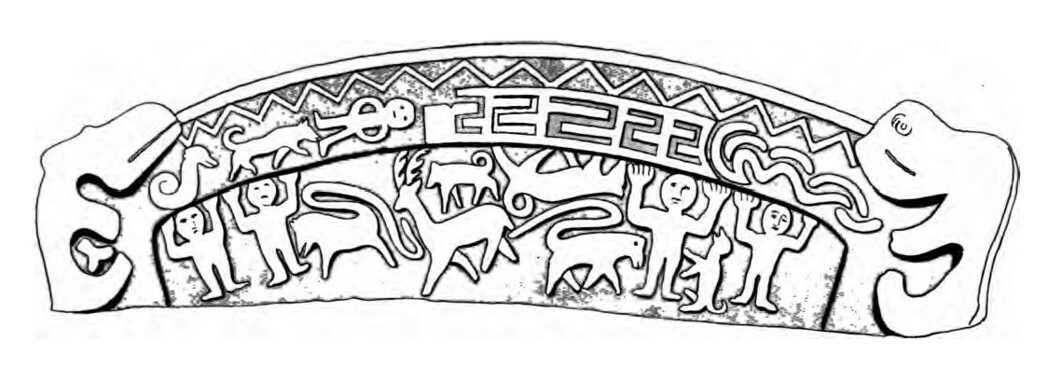
Face of the Heysham hogback depicting four figures with upraised arms, which have been interpreted as Austri, Vestri, Norðri and Suðri holding up the sky

In Nordic mythology, Austri, Vestri, Norðri and Suðri (Old Norse pronunciation: [ˈɔustre, ˈwestre, ˈnorðre, ˈsuðre]); are four dwarfs who hold up the sky after it was made by the gods from the skull of the jötunn Ymir. They are referred to both in Gylfaginning in the Prose Edda and in kennings. They have been further linked to dvergar ("dwarfs"), supports for the main beam of some halls, that are likely named due to the roof being seen as a reflection of the sky in Old Nordic religion.

== Names and etymology ==
Austri, Vestri, Norðri and Suðri have been variously translated as "The one in the East, West, North and South" and "East, West, North and South". The names derive from Old Norse: austr, vestr, suðr and norðr, meaning east, west, south and north respectively.

== Attestations ==
=== Gylfaginning ===
The longest description of the dwarfs is given in Gylfaginning from the Prose Edda, when after the death of Ymir, Odin (in his guise as Þriði) describes the creation of the sky:

Old Norse text

óku þeir ok haus hans ok gerðu þar af himin ok settu hann upp yfir jörðina með fjórum skautum, ok undir hvert horn settu þeir dverg. Þeir heita svá: Austri, Vestri, Norðri, Suðri.

Brodeur translation

They took his [Ymir's] skull also, and made of it the heaven, and set it up over the earth with four corners; and under each corner they set a dwarf: the names of these are East, West, North, and South.

=== Kennings ===
In the skald Hallfreðr vandræðaskáld's Óláfsdrápa Tryggvasonar, the kenning níðbyrðra Norðra ("Burden of the relations of Norðris") is used to refer to the sky. In Skáldskaparmál, Snorri Sturluson says that one can refer to the sky or the heaven with kennings such as Old Norse: erfiði eða byrði dverganna ("Toil or burden of the dwarfs") and hjálm Vestra ok Austra, Suðra, Norðra ("Helm of Vestri and Austri, Suðri, Norðri"). An example of this is quoted from the work of Arnórr jarlaskáld. (Note: The kenning used for sky in this case is erfiði Austra ("Austri toil"))

=== Völuspá ===
The four dwarfs are listed in the section of Völuspá, Dvergatal.

== Archaeological record ==
=== Heysham hogback ===
Scholars have proposed that Austri, Vestri, Norðri and Suðri are depicted holding up the sky on a hogback stone in Heysham in Lancashire, although this interpretation remains debated. Although it has been argued that the dwarfs are depicted out of proportion and in a bestial manner, it has been noted that they closely resemble the human on the other side of the stone and it was unlikely that the carver intended to depict them as looking differently to humans. It has been suggested that the role of the dwarfs in holding up the heavens would imply they were thought to be very tall; however, it has been noted that the sky could have been conceived of as being close to the earth at the horizon. Judgements on their size cannot be supported either way by the hogback stone as the size of the hogback stone imposed physical limitations on the size of depictions.

== Interpretation and discussion ==
=== Connection with hall "dwarfs" ===
It has been noted that the beams that support the roof of the house are known as dvergar ("dwarfs") in Old Norse. This has been connected by some scholars to Austri, Vestri, Norðri and Suðri, suggesting that, as in other cases, the home acts like a microcosm, in which the roof is equated with the sky.

It has been noted that the small wooden blocks that held up the main beam of the roof (Old Norse: ás) were known as dvergar ("dwarfs"). This is first recorded in the 12th century Íslensk hómilíubók but likely reflects earlier naming practices, and is also seen in Denmark and Norway in later times. The term is widely believed by scholars to originate in the traditions of Austri, Vestri, Norðri and Suðri, whose roles parallel the holding up of the main roof beam. This supports the idea that North Germanic heathens saw the hall as representative of the wider world, with the roof equating to the heavens. It is further to be noted that the term for the main roof beam is the same in its singular form as ás, a member of the Æsir (though they differ in plural form). (Note: The plural of the part of the hall (ás) is ásar rather than Æsir, a member of the family of gods.)

It has been argued that this mirroring of the world by the hall is further built up by the design of the hall and the imagery contained within it, such as in the use of pillars that reflect the central tree Yggdrasil. This phenomenon has been seen more widely in other cultural spaces, such as Christian churches, Navajo hogans and Cree tents.

== See also ==
- Anemoi, wind gods in Greek mythology assigned to the cardinal directions
- Atlas, a titan who holds up the sky in Greek mythology
- Four Heavenly Kings, beings in Buddhist tradition that watch over the cardinal directions
- Four Holy Beasts, beings in Chinese tradition assigned to the cardinal directions
- Royal stars, guardians of the corners of the sky in Persian tradition

== Bibliography ==
=== Primary ===
- Sturluson, Snorri (2018). The Prose Edda. Translated by Brodeur, Arthur Gilchrist. Franklin Classics Trade Press. ISBN 9780344335013.
- "Gylfaginning (Old Norse)". heimskringla.no.

=== Secondary ===
- Gould, Chester Nathan (1929). "Dwarf-Names: A Study in Old Icelandic Religion". PMLA. 44 (4): 939–967. doi:10.2307/457704. ISSN 0030-8129. JSTOR 457704. S2CID 163540054.
- Gunnell, Terry Adrian (2005). "Hof, Halls, Goðar and Dwarves: An Examination of the Ritual Space in the Pagan Icelandic Hall". Cosmos 17: 3–36.
- Mikučionis, Ugnius (2017). "Recognizing a dvergr: Physical Status and External Appearance of dvergar in Medieval Nordic Sources (8th-13th century)". Roda da Fortuna: Electronic Journal About Antiquity and Middle Ages. 6 (1). S2CID 221713017.
- Scheuer, Jensen Connor (2017). Dvergatal, Shorthand for a Universe: The Dwarfs of Vǫluspá (Thesis). University of Oslo.
- Simek, Rudolf (2008). A Dictionary of Northern Mythology. Translated by Hall, Angela. BOYE6. ISBN 9780859915137.
