= St Saviour's Church, Stydd =

Coordinates: 53.8189°N 2.5273°W

St Saviour's, Stydd
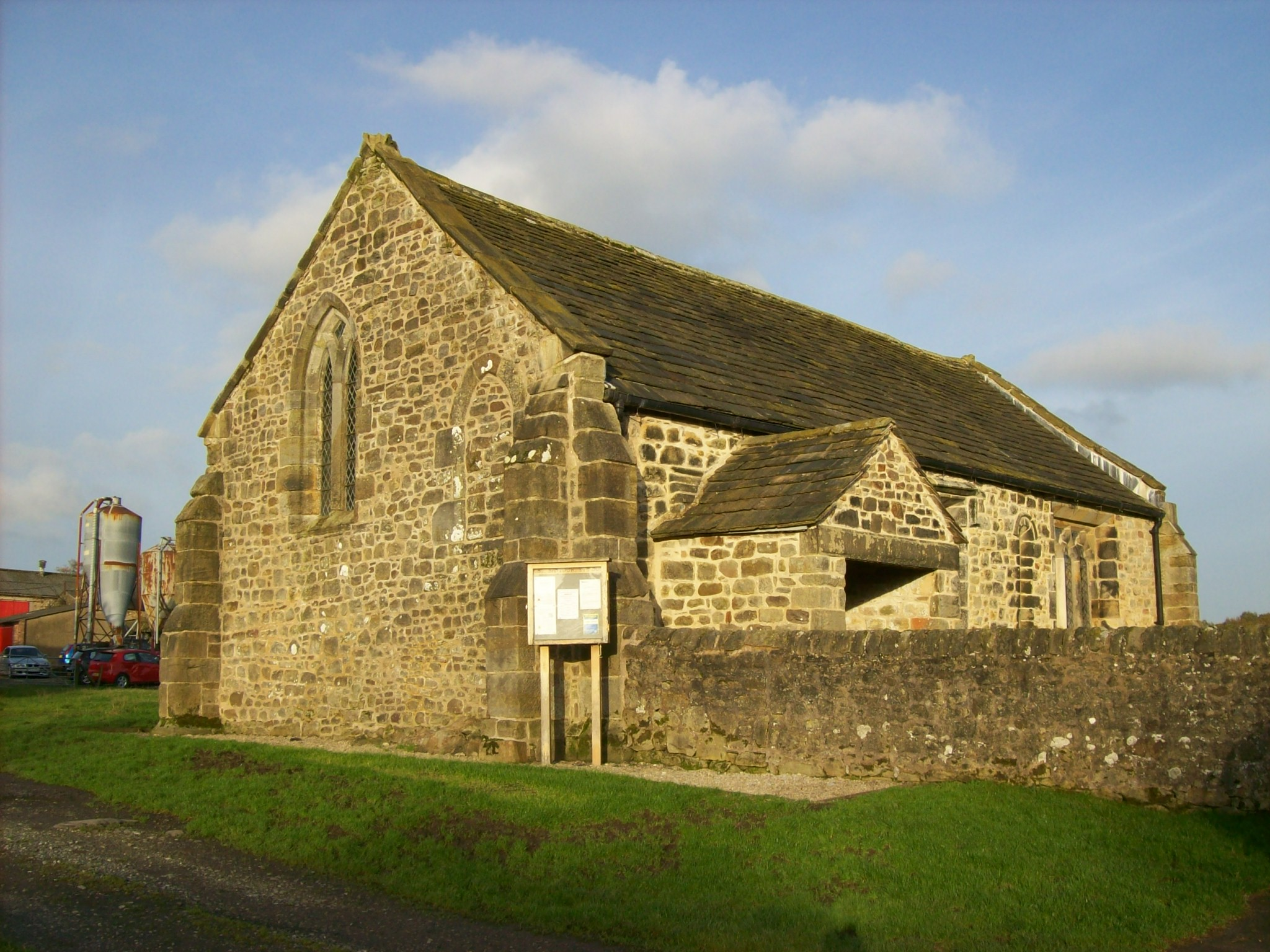

- Location in the Borough of Ribble Valley
- OS grid reference: SD 65384 35981
- Location: Stydd, Lancashire
- Country: England
- Denomination: Anglican
- Website: www.saintwilfrids.org.uk/

Architecture
- Functional status: Active
- Heritage designation: Grade I
- Designated: 11 November 1966

Administration
- Province: York
- Diocese: Blackburn
- Archdeaconry: Lancaster
- Deanery: Preston

St Saviour's Church is an Anglican chapel in Stydd, a hamlet near Ribchester in Lancashire, England. It has been designated a Grade I listed building by English Heritage.

== History ==
There is evidence of a community at Stydd from the 12th century and there has been a place of worship on the site since no later than the 13th century, possibly since 1190. The church is the only one surviving of a group of buildings acquired by the Knights Hospitallers in the late 13th century.

During the First World War, archaeological excavations were undertaken of the area by staff and pupils of nearby Stonyhurst College. Although evidence of buildings surrounding the church was found, identification of their use and date were inconclusive.

== Architecture ==
=== Exterior ===
The church is constructed in sandstone rubble and has a stone slate roof with simple tie beam trusses. It has a simple rectangular plan consisting of a nave and sanctuary under one roof, with a porch to the south-west. It has no tower. There are square angled buttresses to each corner.

There is a doorway on the north side that has a single-chamfered arch. The south doorway is protected by the porch. The west wall has a blocked up doorway. It has a two-centred arch of two moulded orders. There are two Norman windows in the north wall; they are narrow chamfered lights with semi-circular heads. The east window has three lights and the west has two lights; both have intersecting Y-tracery. The south wall has two three-light windows in the Perpendicular style; one has round heads, the other has cusped ogee heads.

=== Interior and fittings ===
The interior of the church measures 46 feet 6 inches (14.17 m) by 20 feet 6 inches (6.25 m). It has a flagged floor and plastered and whitewashed walls. There is a piscina at the east end of the south wall, with a trefoil head, but no bowl. There is no architectural division between the nave and the sanctuary, although the floor of the latter is slightly raised. There is an oak panelled screen between the two that dates from the 17th or 18th century.

The oak pulpit stands against the south wall; it is octagonal with square panels and sits on a stone base. It has a set of stone steps. The octagonal sandstone font is Late Perpendicular in style and has well-preserved carvings of shields. There are stone monuments to Sir Adam and Lady Alicia Clitheroe, and to Bishop Francis Petre.

== See also ==
- Grade I listed churches in Lancashire
