= Heysham rock-cut tombs =

English archaeological site

Coordinates: 54.0475°N 2.9027°W

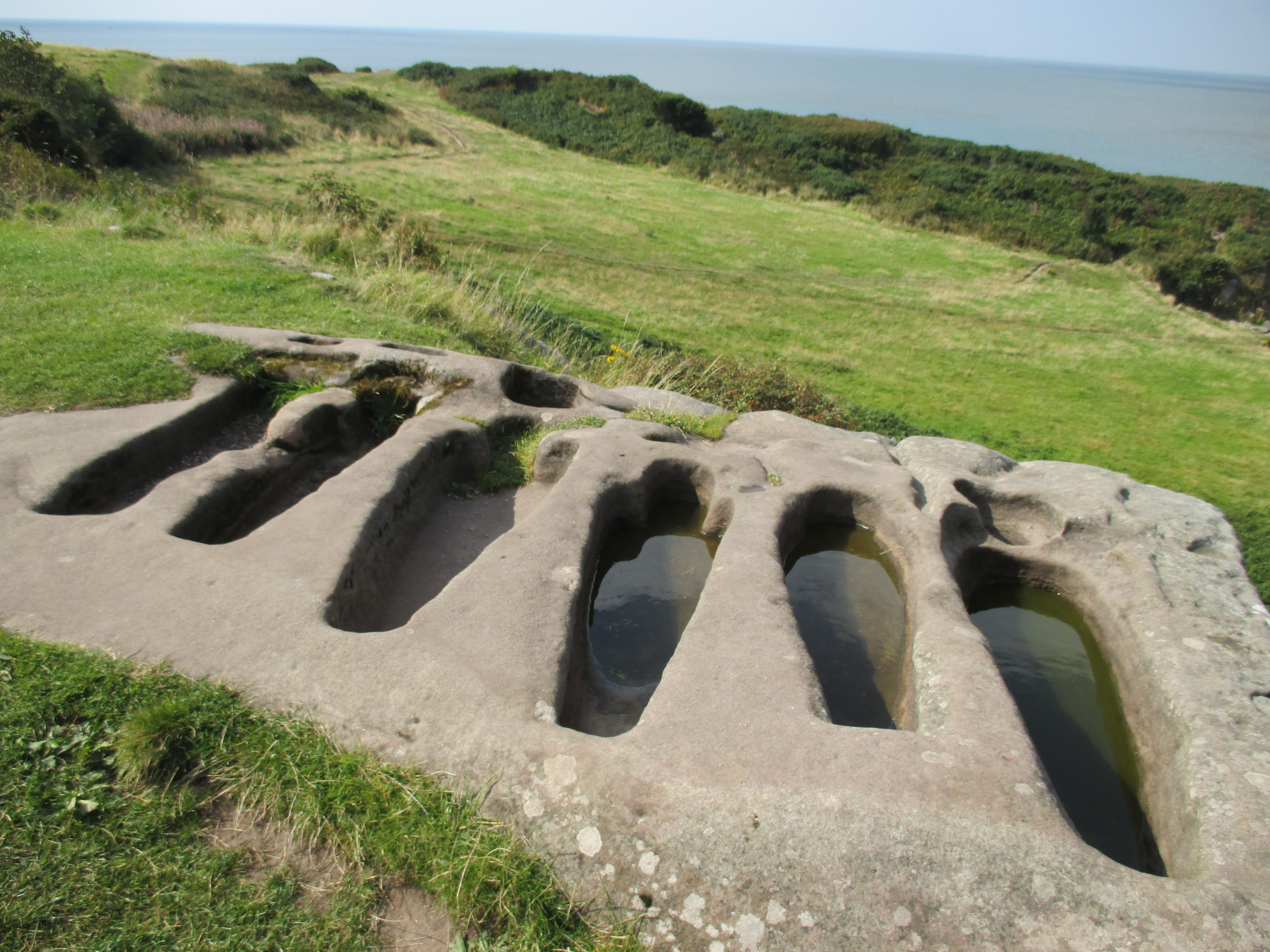
The six rock-cut tombs west of St Patrick's Chapel, Heysham

The Heysham rock-cut tombs or Heysham stone graves are eight pre-Conquest tombs of uncertain date cut into the bedrock of a headland outside St Patrick's Chapel, Heysham, Lancashire. They are thought to be unique. The tombs have been designated as a Grade I listed building and form part of a scheduled monument.

== Location ==
St Patrick's Chapel is a ruined Anglo-Saxon church originally built in the 8th century and expanded at an unknown later date. It stands on a millstone grit headland on the village of Heysham on the north Lancashire coast in north-west England. About 10 metres (33 ft) to the west of the chapel is a group of six graves cut into the rock of the headland, and about 4 metres (13 ft) to the south-east of the chapel are a further group of two. There is also a more conventional cemetery outside the chapel, which radiocarbon dating has assigned to the 10th or 11th century. The entire site has been designated a scheduled monument, and the chapel and each of the groups of graves are Grade I listed buildings. Together, they are considered "one of the best examples in north west England of an early Christian chapel and cemetery".

== Physical description ==
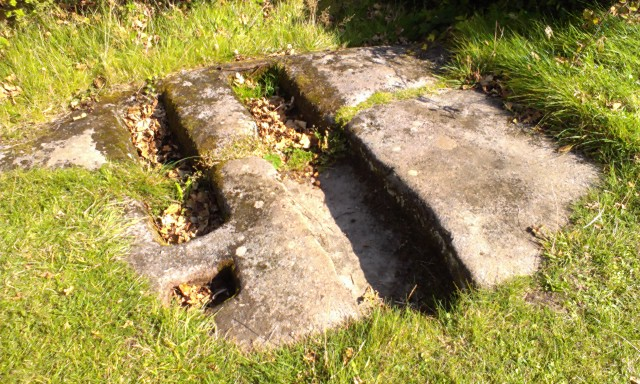
The two rock-cut tombs south east of St Patrick's Chapel, Heysham

The six tombs of the western group are lined up in parallel with an east–west orientation. They vary in size, the largest being 2.03 metres (6 ft 8 in) in length, 0.51 metres (1 ft 8 in) in breadth, and 0.24 metres (9.4 in) in depth, while the smallest is 1.55 metres (5 ft 1 in) in length, 0.33 metres (1 ft 1 in) in breadth, and 0.18 metres (7.1 in) in depth. The two tombs of the south-eastern group are parallel but not quite on an east–west orientation. The larger of them is 1.76 metres (5 ft 9 in) in length, 0.35 metres (1 ft 2 in) (tapering to 0.27 metres (11 in)) in width, and 0.17 metres (6.7 in) in depth, while the smaller is 1.04 metres (3 ft 5 in) in length, 0.25 metres (9.8 in) in breadth, and 0.17 metres (6.7 in) in depth. Both of the south-eastern group and two of the western group are roughly rectangular in shape, but the remaining four are body-shaped, that is they are tapering and have a head-shaped cut at the western end. One of the south-eastern group and all but one of the western group have sockets cut into the rock, presumably to hold the shafts of stone or wooden crosses. 19th-century drawings show the western graves to be separated from the headland's cliff-face by a wall which is no longer in existence, though its foundations are still there.

== Date ==
The date of the tombs has in the past been estimated very variously, from the 8th century (or even earlier) to the 13th century. The stylistic similarities between the two groups of tombs make it likely that they both have a similar date, and it is now generally agreed that they were probably made before the Norman Conquest, though it is possible that they were reused multiple times for centuries afterwards.

== Purpose ==
The small size of some of these tombs raises questions as to their precise purpose. One theory is that they were used as places of sepulture not for whole bodies but for disarticulated bones – perhaps the bones of saints. The archaeologist Howard Williams has suggested an alternative possibility, that they were intended for high-status infant or child burials.

== Conservation concerns ==
Worried by deterioration of the fabric of St Patrick's Chapel from weather erosion and vandalism, a team from the University of Lancaster under the direction of R. D. Andrews and T. W. Potter undertook a rescue archaeological investigation of the site, including the rock-cut tombs, in April 1977 and March–April 1978. In 2017 fears were raised in the local press that continuing erosion of the headland on which St Patrick's Chapel stands were endangering the tombs. A representative of the National Trust, which owns the land, replied that the site is monitored by rangers and that it would be safe for many decades yet.

== In popular culture ==
In 2000 a photograph of the tombs was used for the album cover of The Best of Black Sabbath.
