= Listed buildings in Heysham =

Heysham is an unparished area in Lancaster, Lancashire, England. It contains 26 listed buildings that are recorded in the National Heritage List for England. Of these, four are listed at Grade I, the highest of the three grades, one is at Grade II*, the middle grade, and the others are at Grade II, the lowest grade. The area is mainly occupied by the village of Heysham, with the coast to the west, and the town of Morecambe to the north. The headland overlooking the sea contains some ancient structures that are listed, including a ruined chapel and rock-cut tombs. Most of the other listed buildings are houses, many of them being in the oldest part of the village adjacent to the headland. Elsewhere the listed buildings include a church and associated structures, a public house, and a well.

== Key ==
Grade	Criteria
I	Buildings of exceptional interest, sometimes considered to be internationally important
II*	Particularly important buildings of more than special interest
II	Buildings of national importance and special interest

== Buildings ==
Name and location	Photograph	Date	Notes	Grade
St Patrick's Chapel; 54.04749°N 2.90268°W		8th or 9th century	The ruins of a sandstone chapel, with some restoration using stone tiles. It has a rectangular plan, with walls rising up to 4 metres (13 ft), and others surviving only as foundations. The walls contain a doorway and the jambs of a window. The ruin is a scheduled monument.	I
Archway, St Peter's Church; 54.04711°N 2.90213°W	—	Pre-Conquest	This was the original north doorway of the church, and it was moved to its present site in the churchyard in 1864 when the north aisle was added. It is in sandstone, and consists of a single segmental arch with long-and-short jambs and a recess for a doorway. It is set in a short length of wall.	II
Rock-cut tombs 54.04741°N 2.90269°W		Pre-Conquest	These consist of two tombs cut into the sandstone rocks, one of which is child-sized. Both tombs contain socket holes.	I
Rock-cut tombs 54.04739°N 2.90282°W		Pre-Conquest	These consist of six tombs cut into the sandstone rocks Two of them have straight sides, and the others are body-shaped. All the tombs contain socket holes.	I
Coffin; 54.04730°N 2.90178°W		Medieval	The coffin is in the churchyard of St Peter's Church. It was discovered inside the church in 1864, when it contained a skeleton and a chalice. The coffin is in sandstone, it is roughly hewn, and has a recess for a head.	II
St Peter's Church; 54.04744°N 2.90189°W		14th century	The church contains pre-Conquest remains, it was altered in about 1500, and in the middle of the 19th century, and was restored and a north aisle added in 1864. It is in sandstone with a stone-slate roof, and consists of a nave and a chancel, both with aisles, and a south porch. On the west gable is a double bellcote.	I
Old Hall Inn; 54.04292°N 2.89491°W		1598	Originally a house, and later a public house, it was extended in 1898. It is in sandstone with a stone-slate roof, and consists of a hall and cross-wings, all in one bay. There are two storeys and attics. The main windows are mullioned and transoms, and the attic windows are mullioned with plaques above. On the front is a two-storey porch with a Tudor arched doorway. At the rear is a later extension.	II*
19 Main Street; 54.04603°N 2.90085°W	—	17th century	A roughcast stone house with a slate roof in two storeys with two bays. Some windows are mullioned and they contain a mixture of sashes and casements. The central doorway has a lintel forming a triangle. Projecting on the left is a single-storey extension that contains a datestone.	II
22 Main Street and shop 54.04615°N 2.90042°W		17th century	A roughcast house with a concrete tile roof in one storey with an attic. On the front is a sash window and smaller windows; on the left return is a mullioned attic window. The doorway has a chamfered surround and a battlemented lintel. Attached to the right is a Heritage Centre and shop.	II
Jenny Wren Cottage; 54.04698°N 2.89932°W		17th century (possible)	A pair of houses that were altered in the 20th century, they are in sandstone with brown tile roofs. The houses have two storeys, and each has a two-bay front with a central doorway. The left house has 20th-century casement windows, and the windows in the right house are sashes.	II
1–5 Main Street; 54.04757°N 2.90087°W		1680	This originated as a rectory, it was extended in the 18th century, and later divided into separate dwellings. The building is in sandstone, partly whitewashed and partly roughcast, with a slate roof. The original building has a T-shaped plan, and two storeys. The windows are mullioned, and above the door is a dated lintel. Inside is part of a stone spiral staircase.	II
Sundial shaft 54.04726°N 2.90179°W	—	1696	The sundial shaft is in the churchyard of St Peter's Church, It is in sandstone on a base of two steps. The shaft has a square plan, chamfered to octagonal in the lower part. The square cap is inscribed with the date, and the plate is missing.	II
8, 10 and 12 Main Street; 54.04674°N 2.90090°W	—	1721 (probable)	A row of three roughcast houses with a slate roof. They are in two storeys, the central house with two bays, and the others with one. The central house has mullioned windows and a date plaque, and the other houses have casement windows.	II
40 Main Street; 54.04588°N 2.89990°W	—	Early to mid 18th century	A sandstone house with a slate roof, between larger buildings. It has two storeys and one bay. The windows have chamfered surrounds, and the mullions have been removed. The door has a plain stone lintel.	II
St Patrick's Well; 54.04688°N 2.90115°W		18th century (possible)	The well is set into a wall. It has a recess that is roughly semicircular, above which is a lintel. In front of the recess are two steps.	II
Royal Hotel and outbuildings 54.04647°N 2.90099°W		Mid 18th century (probable)	A stone public house, partly roughcast and partly painted, with slate roofs. The main part has two storeys, three bays, and mullioned windows. To the right is a former three-storey gabled warehouse containing a loading door. To the right of this is a former barn with a cart entrance and a modern shop front. To the left of the main part is another former farm building.	II
Manor House; 54.04723°N 2.90052°W		Early 19th century	A house and an attached cottage. The house is stuccoed with a slate roof, in two storeys with a symmetrical three-bay front. In the centre is a Tuscan porch, and the windows are sashes. At the rear is a wing, and a cottage that is roughcast; this has two storeys, one bay, and mullioned windows.	II
Heysham Head House; 54.04381°N 2.90319°W	—	Early to mid 19th century	A sandstone house with an embattled parapet and a hipped slate roof. It has a rectangular plan and two storeys. The east front has three bays. On the front is a single-storey porch with round corner turrets and an embattled parapet. The windows are sashes with Gothick glazing.	II
Garden walls, Heysham Head House; 54.04355°N 2.90260°W	—	Early to mid 19th century	The walls are on three sides of a rose garden. They are in sandstone with curved corners. On the west side are three recesses for seats. Opposite the porch of the house are steps flanked by niches.	II
Lodge, Heysham Head House; 54.04543°N 2.90135°W		Early to mid 19th century	The lodge is roughcast with sandstone quoins, a hipped roof, and an embattled parapet. It has two storeys and three bays. In the centre is an elliptical archway, and the windows are mullioned with chamfered surrounds and hood moulds.	II
Walls, Heysham Head House; 54.04342°N 2.90307°W	—	Early to mid 19th century	The walls are in sandstone, and contain a number of features. These include a Tudor arched gateway, a mullioned window, a flight of stone steps, and niches with statues. The north wall has an arcade of three arches carried on columns with Doric capitals.	II
Penhale Court; 54.03932°N 2.89604°W	—	Mid 19th century	A sandstone house with a slate roof, in two storeys with attics, and with a symmetrical front of threebays. In the centre is a Tuscan porch and a doorway with a moulded architrave, and this is flanked by single-storey canted bay windows. The other windows are top-hung casements giving the appearance of sash windows.	II
Churchyard wall, St Peter's Church; 54.04731°N 2.90224°W	—	Mid 19th century (probable)	The sandstone churchyard walls contain some earlier fragments. These include two sets of quoins, a blocked window, and blind arrowslits in Gothic style.	II
Carr Garth; 54.04669°N 2.89966°W	—	Mid to late 19th century	A sandstone house with a slate roof, in two storeys with a five-bay front. The windows are mullioned and contain casements, some original and some modern. The doorway has a chamfered surround. At the rear is a parallel range and a projecting wing.	II
Wall and gate piers, Carr Garth; 54.04687°N 2.89964°W	—	Mid to late 19th century (probable)	The walls and gate piers are in sandstone. The walls enclose two sides of the garden and have triangular coping. There are two gate piers in the west wall, they are rusticated, with a square plan, and have pyramidal caps.	II
Lodge, Heysham Hall; 54.04143°N 2.89636°W	—	1870	The lodge is in sandstone with a slate roof. It has a cruciform plan and is in two storeys. Its features include a mullioned window, bay windows, a two-storey porch with a coped parapet, a dated plaque, and gables with ball finials.	II
