= Heysham hogback =

Sculpture in Lancashire, England

Coordinates: 54.0474°N 2.9018°W

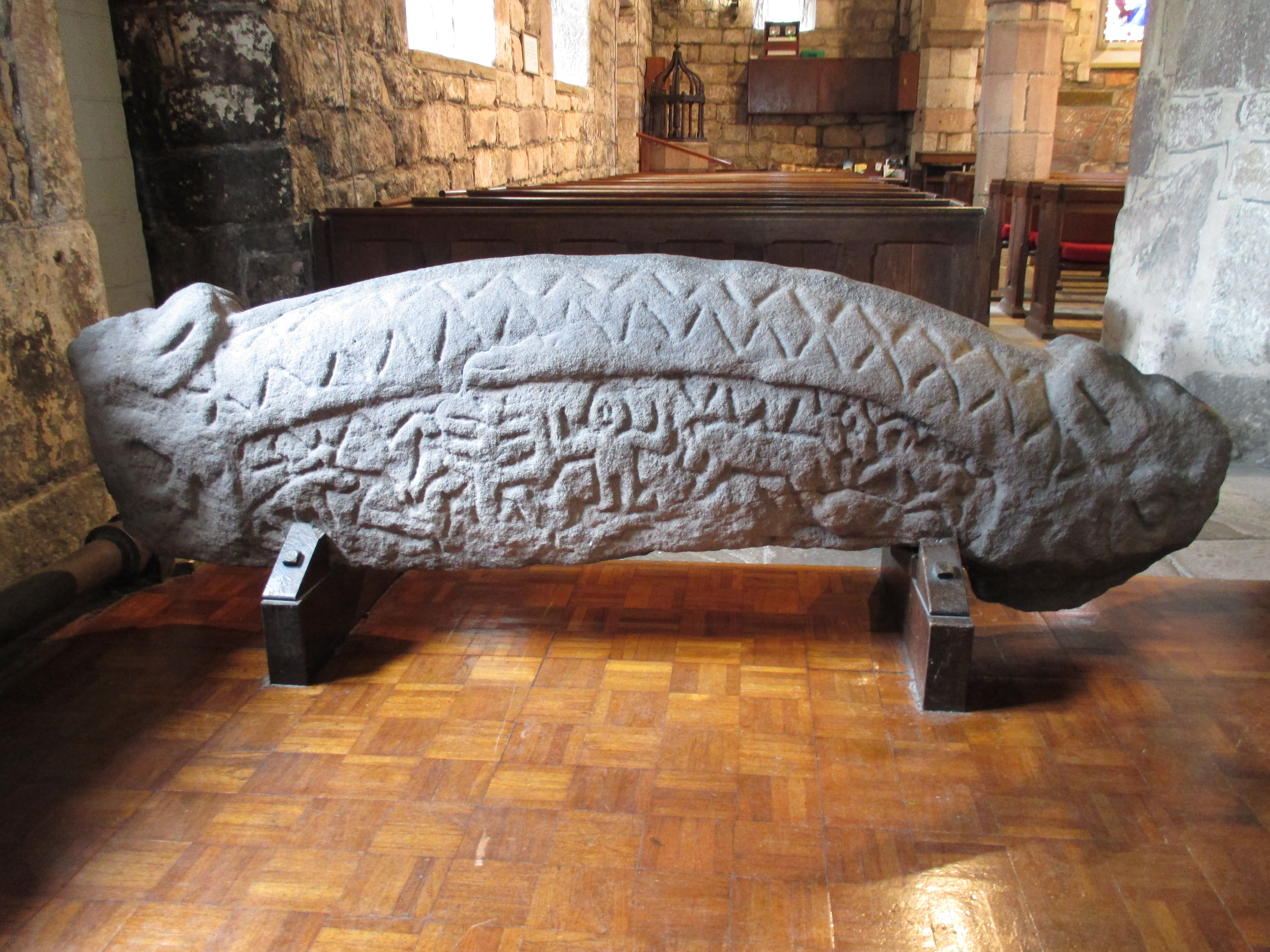
Face B

The Heysham hogback is an early medieval sculpted stone discovered around the beginning of the 19th century in the churchyard of St Peter's Church, Heysham, on the Lancashire coast, and now kept for protection inside the church. It is one of seventeen known early medieval stones in Heysham, a concatenation which once caused this site to be called "one of the most interesting in the country from the archaeological point of view". It is a product of the 10th-century Norse culture of the British Isles of which the precise purpose is not certainly known, though it may be a grave-marker. The carvings on the stone have been the subject of much dispute, different scholars interpreting them as showing a hunting scene, the patriarch Adam, the Norse hero Sigurd, the end of the world in Norse myth, or as being intended to blend both Christian and pagan themes. It has been called "perhaps the best example of its kind in the country".

== History ==
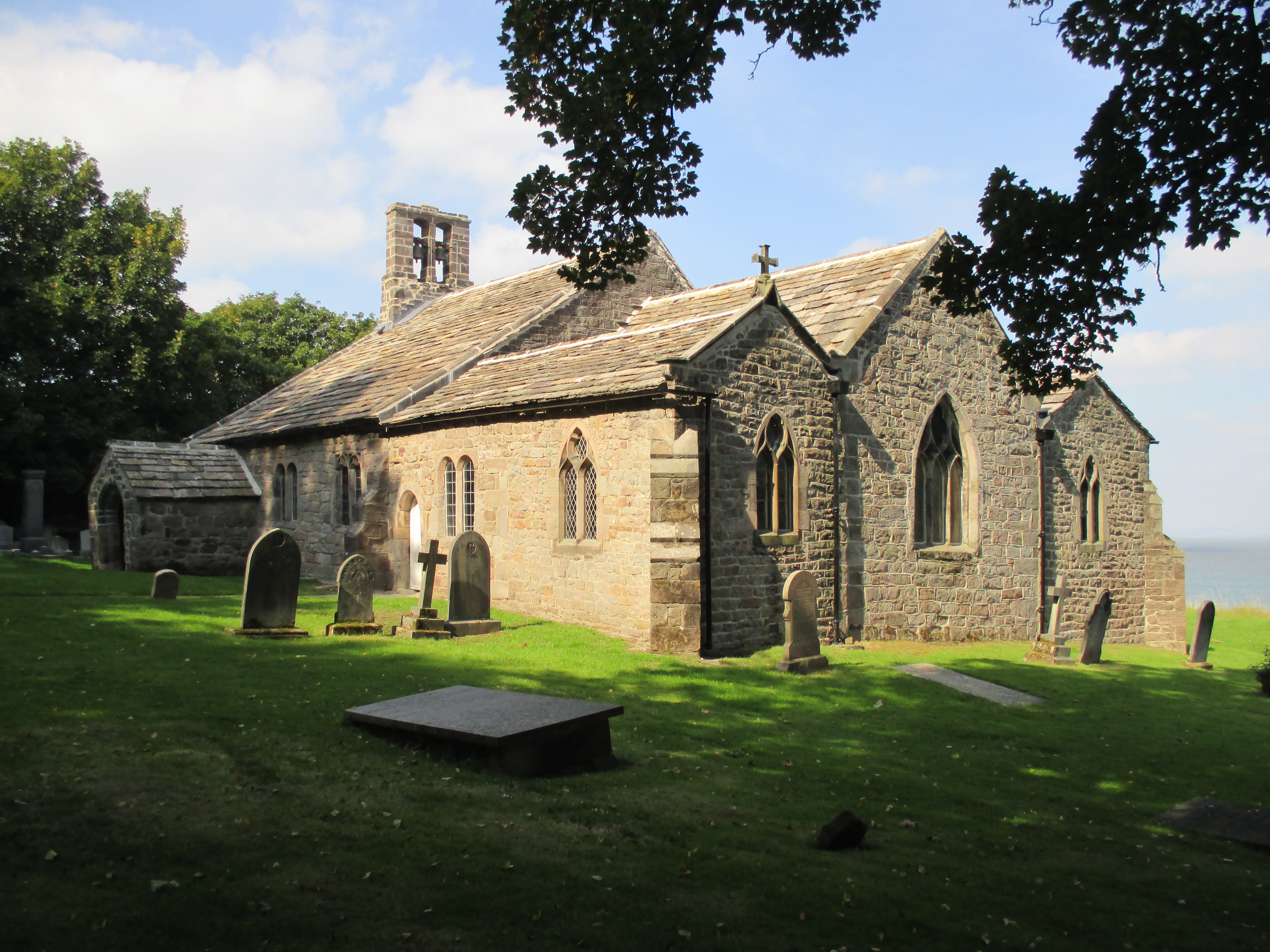
St Peter's Church, Heysham

The Heysham hogback is, like other hogbacks, a grave-marker, monument or perhaps cenotaph, dating from the 10th century and probably from the period 920–950. The man it commemorates is thought to have been a high-status individual connected with the Hiberno-Norse communities of Cumbria or Yorkshire, and its position on the coast suggests that he was a trader.

The first documentary record of the hogback is a mention in the 1811 edition of An Historical and Descriptive Account of the Town of Lancaster, published by Christopher Clark, of its discovery in St Peter's churchyard. The 1807 edition of this work does not mention it, from which it has been argued that it must have been unearthed between those two years, but this inference has been disputed. The same work claims that "at the time of its discovery, there was found deposited under it, the remains of a human skeleton, and also, a piece of iron, which had apparently been the head of a spear". This, if true, would make it the only hogback found in association with human remains or grave goods. A much later account in Edward L. Cutts's A Manual for the Study of the Sepulchral Slabs and Crosses of the Middle Ages (1849) surmises that it was found in the adjoining St Patrick's Chapel.

It was kept in the open air in St Peter's churchyard where it suffered erosion from the weather and from the many local children who, over the years, played at taking rides on it. In 1961 it was taken into the church, where it remains.

== Physical description ==
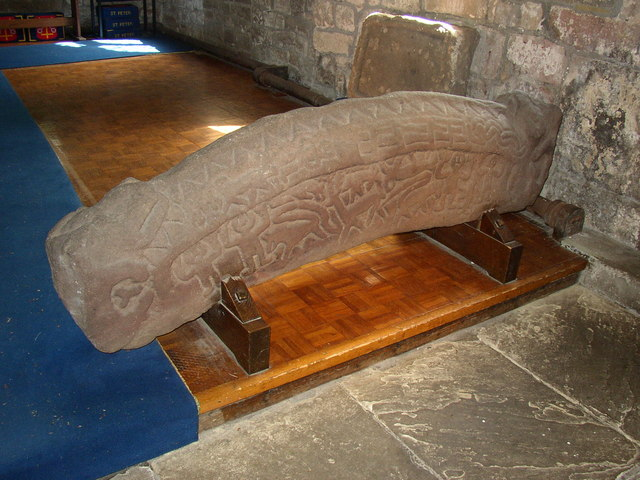
Face A

The hogback's length is 205.8 cm (81.0 in), its width varies between 17.8 cm (7.0 in) and 20.3 cm (8.0 in), and its height between 33.0 cm (13.0 in) and 39.4 cm (15.5 in). It is made of Ward's Stone sandstone, a pale brown millstone grit of the Silsden Formation which could have originated anywhere on the Morecambe Bay coast between Heysham and Bolton-le-Sands. It is in good condition except on the ridge, which shows signs of wear.

== The carvings ==
The hogback is carved on all sides with figures. At each of the two ends is a beast with a head disproportionately large for its body-size and, unusually, with four legs – on most hogbacks only two are shown. Face A is topped by a row of tegulae, i.e. tile shapes, below which is a roof area featuring amid abstract decoration a recumbent human figure, curly-tailed animal and a twisting snake-like shape. The lower "wall" section is framed by four human figures, two on each side, with hands raised in the orans position; between the two humans on the right is a beast, possibly a dog, in a vertical position. In the middle of the "wall" area, between the two groups of human figures, are five beasts, three of which are at "ground" level; one of these is identifiable as a stag with antlers. Above "ground" level are two more beasts, one, perhaps a dog, standing on the stag's back and the other in an inverted position above one of the "ground"-level beasts. Face B has, above, two rows of tegulae. Beneath them, reading from left to right, are two beasts, one above the other, two large birds, a tree (?) with horizontal branches, a third bird, a human figure in the orans position, and on the furthest right two more beasts.

== Interpretation ==
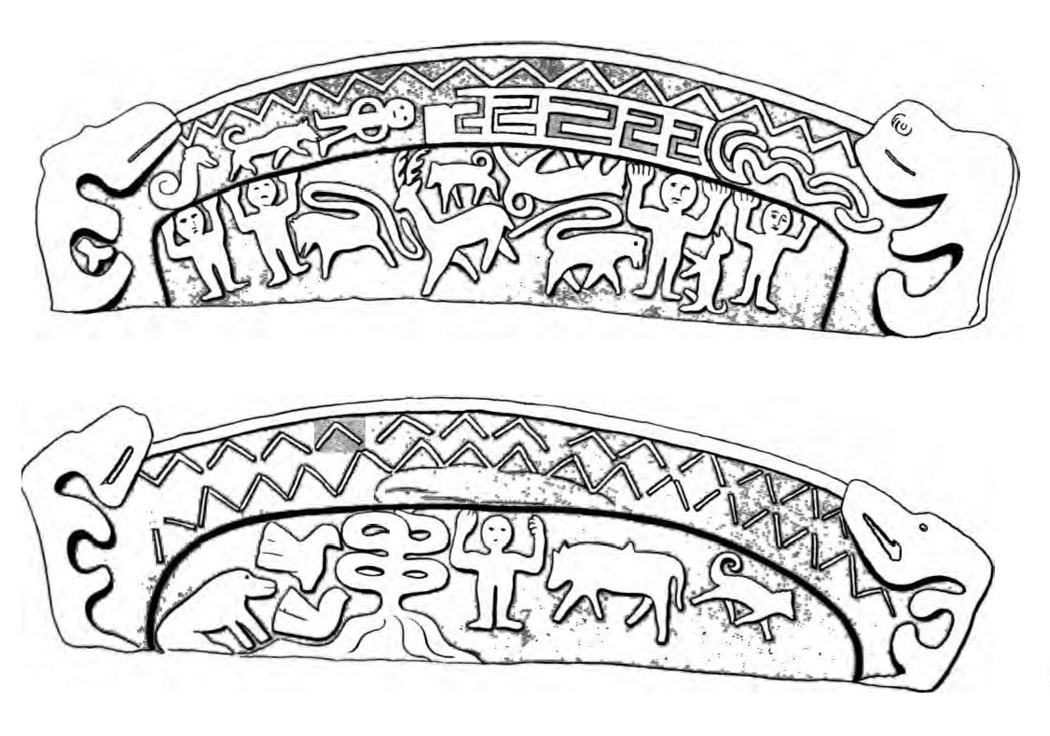
A "diagrammatic restoration" of the Heysham hogsback published in 1892. Face A above, face B below.

The very first published record of the Heysham hogback, in 1811, confessed that "it is not so easy to discover the Artist's meaning in the figures represented thereon". This has not stopped scholars from forming theories, some of which were presented to the Lancashire and Cheshire Antiquarian Society towards the end of the 19th century. The archaeologist George Forrest Browne wrote in 1887 that the scenes depicted could scarcely be anything but an animal hunt, pictured for its own sake rather than as a religious allegory. To this Thomas Lees objected that "The persons are represented less as hunters than as themselves hunted by wild beasts." His own view, given in 1891, was that the subject of the sculpture was the Death of Adam, a story found in certain Islamic legends and in Greek apocryphal Christian sources: the Apocalypse of Moses, the Gospel of Nicodemus, the Acts of Philip. The same year, Henry Colley March criticised this interpretation, the story of Adam's death being in his view too little-known in the early Middle Ages and capable of explaining too few of the figures on the hogback. He considered the scenes there a depiction of the story of Ragnarök, the end of the universe in Norse mythology, reinterpreted by a Christian artist to proclaim Christ the Conqueror and Christ the Redeemer.

Writing in 1950, H. R. Ellis Davidson found the Adamic interpretation far-fetched, preferring March's Ragnarök interpretation of face A, though she was more sceptical of its relevance to face B since it fails to explain several of the beasts. She concluded that March's theory explains the evidence more plausibly than any other. More recently, support has been expressed both for the Ragnarök theory and by others for an interpretation of the carvings as a version of the Biblical story of Adam's naming of the animals, a theme also explored by medieval Irish sculptors. Another new interpretation has emerged, supported by James Lang and Thor Ewing among others, which would see the carvings as being a portrayal of the legend of Sigurd and Regin, but proponents of this theory face the problem that several of the images normally found in British Sigurd sculptures are absent from the Heysham hogback. Rosemary Cramp took a compromise position, proposing that face A had a Christian subject and face B a pagan one, though she acknowledged that "it is equally possible that all of these strange motifs were capable of being interpreted in the light of both religions". Sue Margeson held an opinion similar to Browne's, seeing in the Heysham carvings no more than a simple hunting scene.

Andrew White, the curator of Lancaster Museum, has warned that "the only people who are certain about the subject of the Hogback are those who do not know anything about the genre", and the archaeologist B. J. N. Edwards summed up the state of the scholarship thus: "Despite a number of attempts to 'explain' the sculptures, none has yet been put forward which is really convincing, and it has to go down as a 'don't know'."
