= St Peter's Church, Heysham =

Coordinates: 54.0474°N 2.9019°W

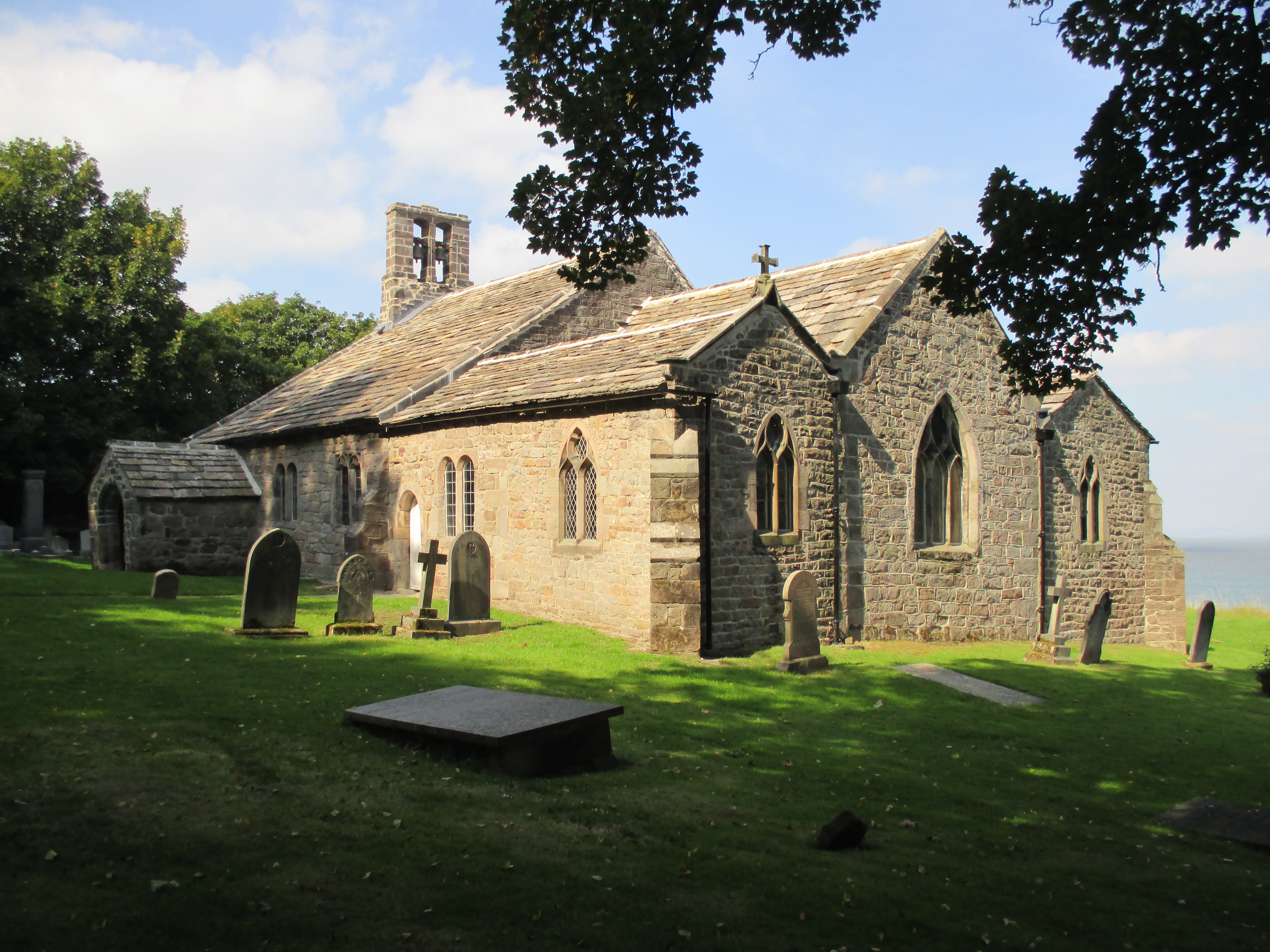
- St Peter's Church, Heysham

- Location in the City of Lancaster district
- OS grid reference: SD 410 616
- Location: Main Street, Heysham, Lancashire
- Country: England
- Denomination: Anglican
- Website: https://www.heyshamparish.org.uk/

History
- Status: Parish church
- Founded: 7th/8th century
- Dedication: St Peter

Architecture
- Functional status: Active
- Heritage designation: Grade I
- Designated: 29 February 1950
- Architect: E. G. Paley (restoration)
- Architectural type: Church
- Style: Anglo-Saxon, Norman, Gothic, Gothic Revival
- Completed: 1864

Specifications
- Capacity: 188
- Materials: Sandstone rubble Stone slate roofs

Administration
- Province: York
- Diocese: Blackburn
- Archdeaconry: Lancaster
- Deanery: Lancaster
- Parish: Heysham

Clergy
- Rector: Rev Mark Nelson

St Peter's Church is in the village of Heysham, Lancashire, England. It is recorded in the National Heritage List for England as a designated Grade I listed building. It is an active Anglican parish church in the deanery of Lancaster, the archdeaconry of Lancaster and the diocese of Blackburn.

== History ==
It is believed that a church was founded on this site in the 7th or 8th century. In 1080 it was recorded that the location was the site of an old Anglo-Saxon church. Some of the fabric of that church remains in the present church. The chancel was built around 1340–50 and the south aisle was added in the 15th century. The north aisle was added in 1864 and other extensions and restorations were carried out by the Lancaster architect E. G. Paley. At that time an Anglo-Saxon doorway was moved and rebuilt in the churchyard, and two galleries which had served as private pews with their own entrances were taken down.

== Architecture ==
The church is built in sandstone rubble with stone slate roofs. Its plan consists of a three-bay nave with north and south aisles under a continuous roof, a lower two-bay chancel with north and south aisles under pitched roofs, the south aisle containing a chapel, a south porch and a bellcote containing two bells on the west gable. The west front has a pair of buttresses between which is a blocked Anglo-Saxon round-headed doorway. Above this is a two-light 19th-century window. The east window of three lights dates from around 1300 as does the two-light window in the south wall of the chancel. Built into the chancel walls are coffin lids and the gravestone of a 17th-century vicar. The octagonal sandstone font probably dates from the 16th century. The chancel arch has early Norman capitals with rope mouldings. On the west wall is a medieval sepulchral slab with a floriated cross and sword.

== The Heysham hogback ==
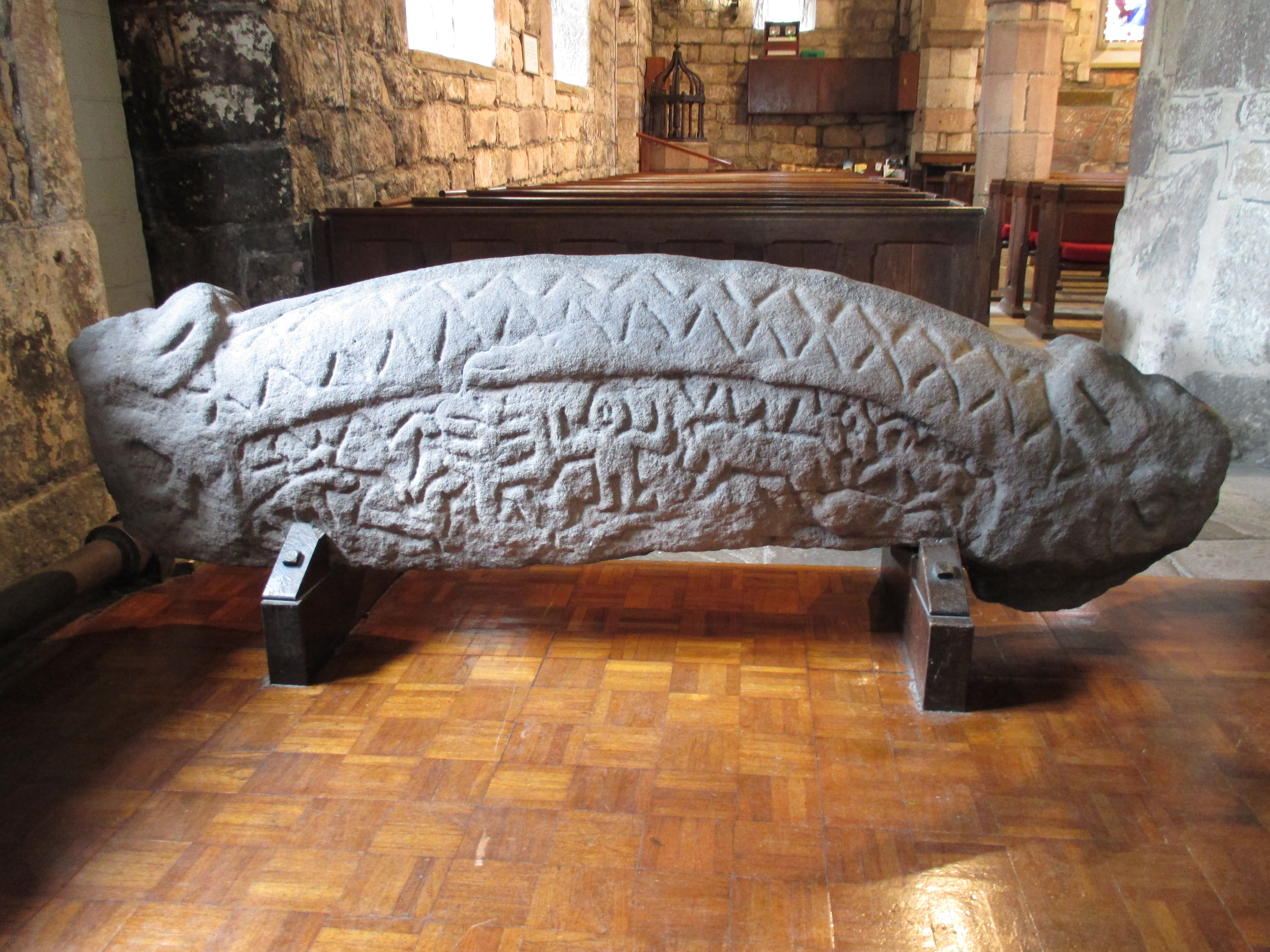
The hogback

In the south chancel aisle is an excellent 10th century Viking hogback stone which is covered in carvings of wolves, deer, and men on one side, and, on the other side, of a man next to a large tree with animals. It appears to be red sandstone and measures over six feet long, around a foot wide, and in the middle about 2 ft tall. Ewing (2003) reports a variety of interpretations of the images, including H. C. March's that the carvings are a representation of the poem Völuspá and the victory of Christianity over paganism. It also includes Edwards' (1998) claim that the meaning of the carvings is unknown.

== External features ==
In the churchyard is the rebuilt Anglo-Saxon sandstone archway moved from the church in the 19th century. It is listed Grade II, as is the walling to the west of the archway. Also listed Grade II is a sandstone sundial shaft dated 1696, and a medieval sandstone coffin. Also in the churchyard is the lower part of the decorated shaft of an Anglo-Saxon cross on a modern sandstone base. It is a scheduled monument. In addition the churchyard contains the war graves of eight Commonwealth service personnel of World War I, and three of World War II.

== See also ==
- Grade I listed buildings in Lancashire
- Grade I listed churches in Lancashire
- Scheduled monuments in Lancashire
- St Patrick's Chapel, Heysham – ruins 50 yards from St Peter's
- Listed buildings in Heysham
- List of ecclesiastical works by E. G. Paley

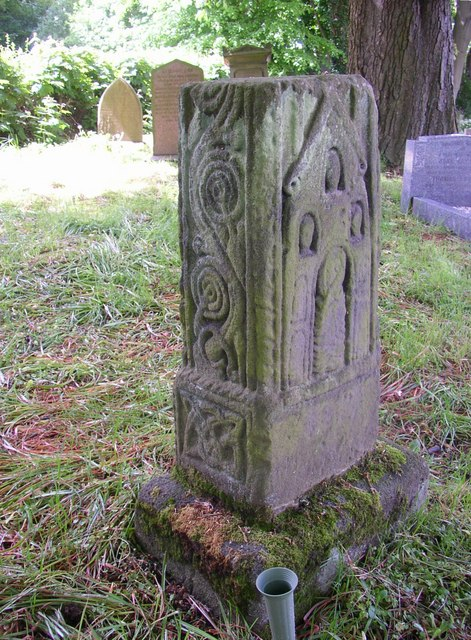
Anglo-Saxon cross base
