= Heysham =

Coastal village in Lancashire, England

Coordinates: 54.046°N 2.894°W

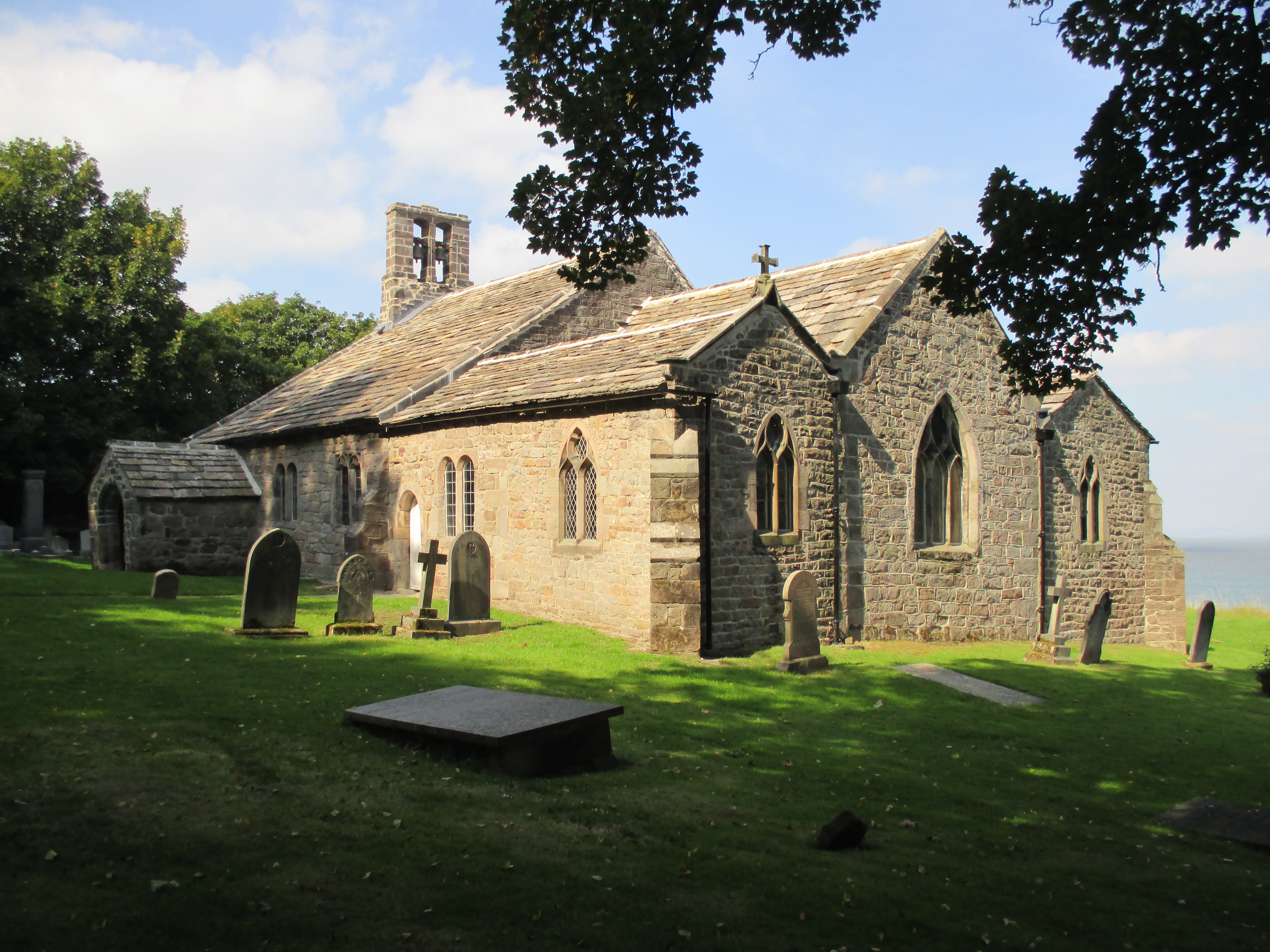
- St Peter's Church

- Location in the City of Lancaster district Location on Morecambe Bay Location within Lancashire
- Population: 17,016
- OS grid reference: SD415615
- District: Lancaster
- Shire county: Lancashire
- Region: North West
- Country: England
- Sovereign state: United Kingdom
- Post town: MORECAMBE
- Postcode district: LA3
- Dialling code: 01524
- Police: Lancashire
- Fire: Lancashire
- Ambulance: North West
- UK Parliament: Morecambe and Lunesdale

Heysham (/ˈhiːʃəm/ HEE-shəm) is a coastal village in the Lancaster district of Lancashire, England, overlooking Morecambe Bay. It is a ferry port, with services to the Isle of Man and Ireland, and the site of two nuclear power stations.

== History ==
Of historical interest are the stone-hewn graves in the ruins of the ancient St. Patrick's Chapel, close to St Peter's Church. They are thought to date from the 11th century, and are carved from solid rock. Local legend has it that St Patrick landed here after crossing from Ireland and established the chapel. However it has been established that the chapel was built around 300 years after Patrick's death, and is thus associated with early Celtic Christianity. These stone graves appear on the cover of the Black Sabbath CD, The Best of Black Sabbath.

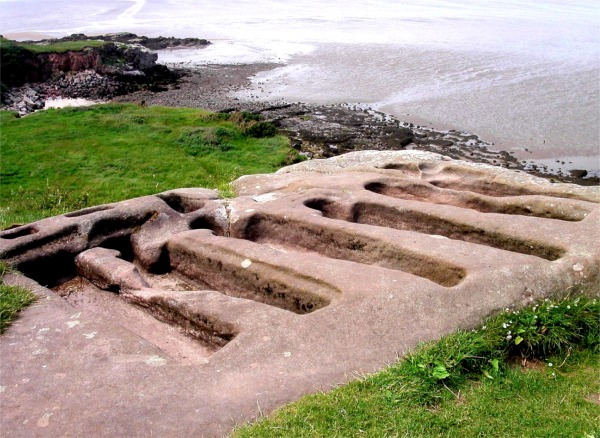
Stone-hewn graves overlooking Morecambe Bay

The grounds of St Peter's Church contain many Saxon and Viking era remains, and the church itself contains a Viking era hogback stone. The origins of these strange stone sculptures is the subject of much debate; they are found mainly in Northern England and Scotland, with a few in Wales, Ireland and Cornwall. Many are associated with the Cumbric British Kingdom of Strathclyde. Four figures on the hogback have been interpreted by scholars as the four dwarfs who hold up the sky in Nordic mythology, Norðri, Suðri, Austri and Vestri, although this is debated. Heysham also has one of only three sites in Britain and Ireland that contain a pre-Roman labyrinth carving; the others are at Tintagel, Cornwall and Hollywood, Co. Wicklow, Ireland.

Lancaster Museum holds artefacts from the area such as stone axe and hammer heads, some weighing up to 4 kg (9 lb), dating back to the New Stone Age. Many of these artefacts and their original location suggest that this was an ancient burial ground, or barrow; the area is still known locally as "The Barrows". The Barrows are the only sea-cliffs in Lancashire and contain, in a relatively small area, woodland, open grassland, sandy beaches and deep rock pools.

The artist J. M. W. Turner visited Heysham in the 1790s when travelling throughout Britain. On a visit in August 1816, he made sketches which formed the basis of his subsequent watercolour Heysham and Cumberland Mountains (British Museum); it depicts the village with the Lakeland backdrop across Morecambe Bay.

Heysham Heritage Centre is housed in the barn of a Longhouse in Main Street. The building is owned by the Heritage Trust for the North West, who also own the cottage part of the longhouse, 22 Main Street. The Heritage Centre is run by volunteers, most of whom belong to Heysham Heritage Association.

== Demography and governance ==
Administratively, Heysham is part of the City of Lancaster district and has three wards: Heysham Central (with a population of 4,397 in 2001, increasing to 4,478 at the 2011 Census), Heysham North (5,477 in 2001, decreasing to 5,274 at the 2011 Census) and Heysham South (6,262 in 2001, increasing to 7,264 at the 2011 Census). Together they had a population of 16,136 (2001 census), and 17,016 (2011 census). These include areas beyond the village of Heysham itself, which has a population of about 6,500.

Heysham North ward is within the area covered by Morecambe Town Council.

From 1899 to 1928, Heysham was administered by Heysham Urban District Council, from 1928 to 1974 by Morecambe and Heysham Municipal Borough Council, and since 1974 by Lancaster City Council.

== Community ==
Heysham is the terminus of the Stanlow–Heysham oil pipeline at the site of the former Heysham Refinery, and of a gas pipeline that originates in the Morecambe gas fields in the Irish Sea.

== Industry ==
Heysham oil refinery was located between Heysham and Middleton and operated from 1941 to 1976.

== Transport ==
Heysham Port started operation in 1904. There is a ferry service to the Isle of Man, as well as freight to Ireland and services for the eastern Irish Sea and Morecambe Bay gas fields. A SeaCat service to Belfast started in 1999.

Some ferries connect with trains from Heysham Port railway station to Lancaster via the Morecambe Branch Line.

As of March 2026 buses are run by Stagecoach in Lancaster.

The Bay Gateway dual carriageway opened in October 2016, connecting Heysham directly to the M6 motorway.

== Nature and wildlife ==
The Lancashire Wildlife Trust manages a 3-hectare (7.4-acre) nature reserve near to the nuclear power stations. Whitethroats breed on the scrubland. Nearby, on the sea shore is a patch of rock known as Red Nab where waders and gulls roost and congregate. Two warm water outfalls from the power stations enrich the food supply for migratory seabirds such as little gulls and Mediterranean gulls. Winter visitors include kittiwakes and purple sandpipers.

== Notable people ==
- Gertrude Partington Albright (1874–1959), an American artist of portrait etchings and Cubism-influenced California landscapes. She taught at the California School of Fine Arts for nearly thirty years.
- Lizzi Collinge (born c. 1980), politician, MP for Morecambe and Lunesdale since 2024.

=== Sport ===
- Mark Edmondson (born 1979), former rugby league footballer who played 119 games for St Helens R.F.C.
- David Perkins (born 1982), footballer who played 710 games, including 178 for Morecambe

== Gallery ==
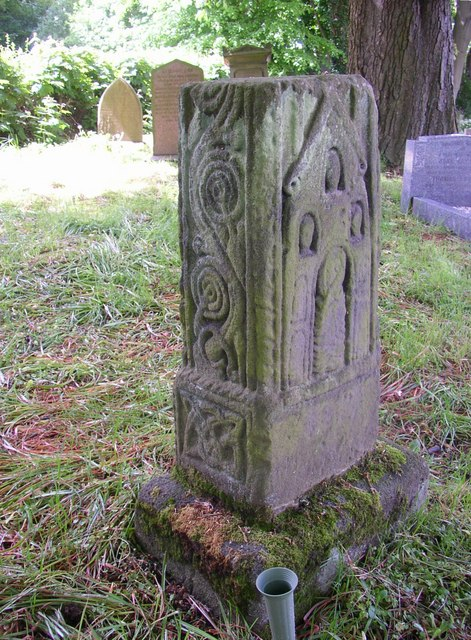
Anglo-Saxon carved stone cross base

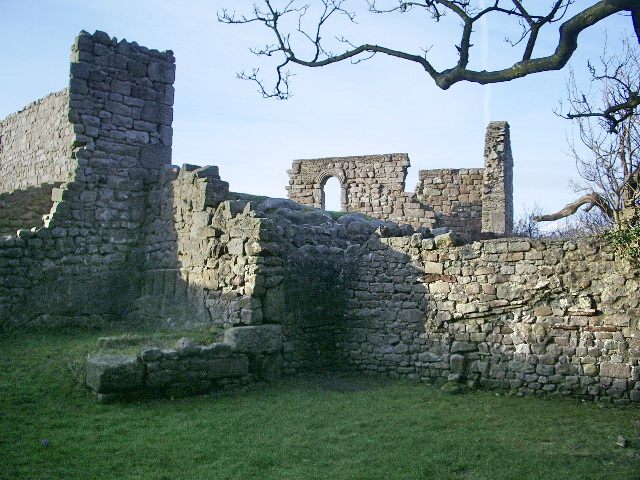
St Patrick's Chapel

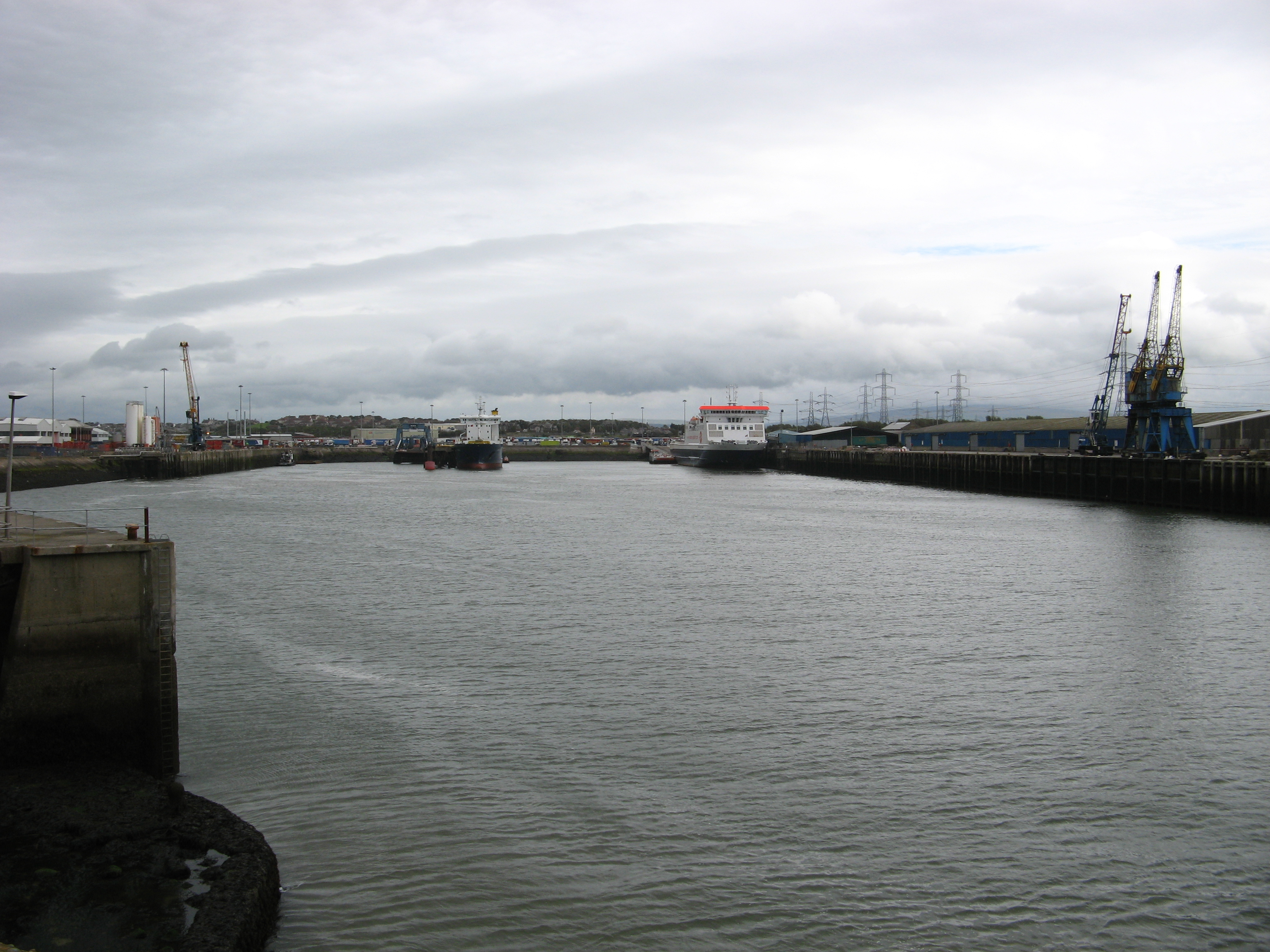
Heysham Harbour

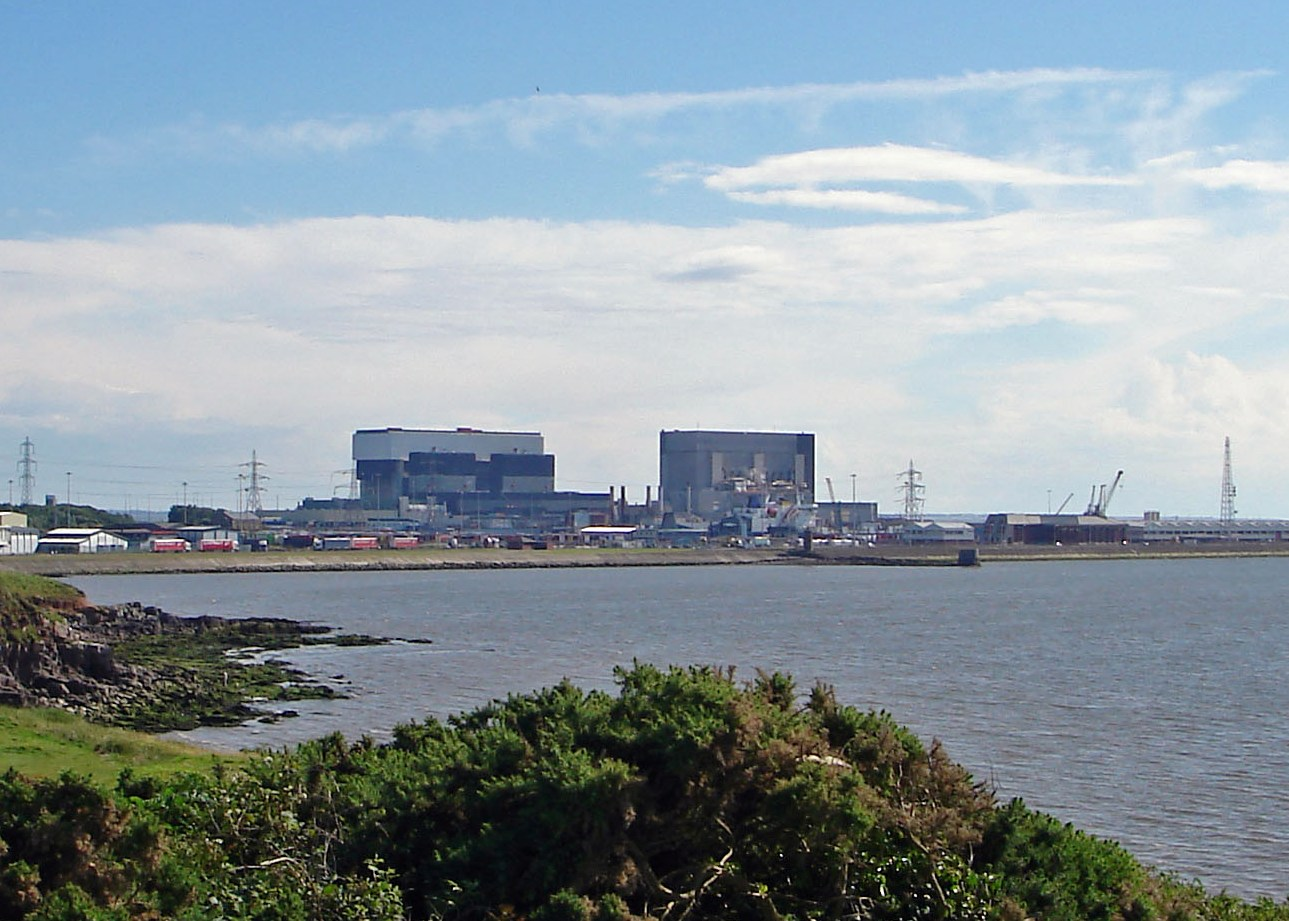
Heysham nuclear power station

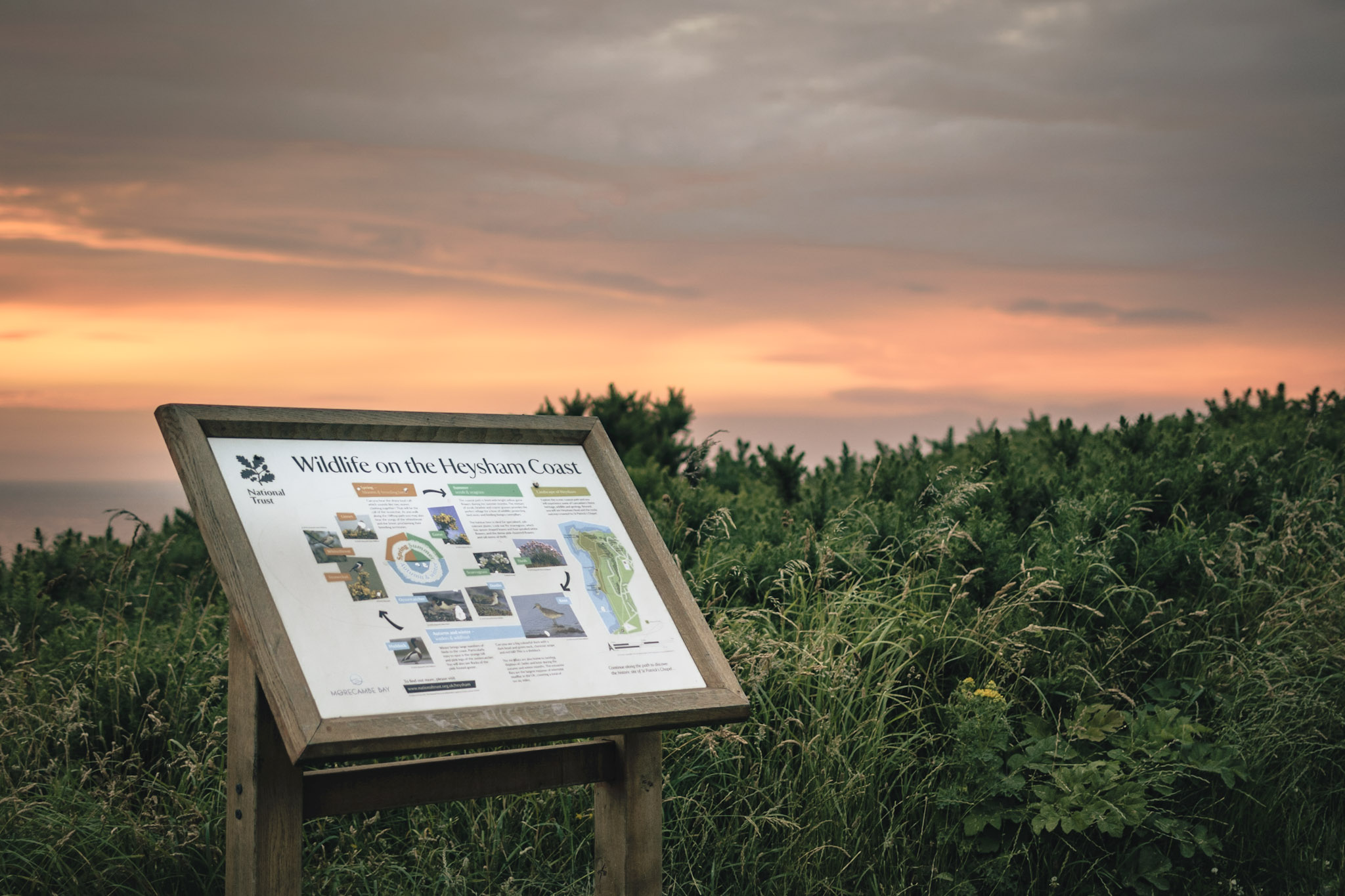
Sunset across 'The Barrows' on Heysham Nature Reserve

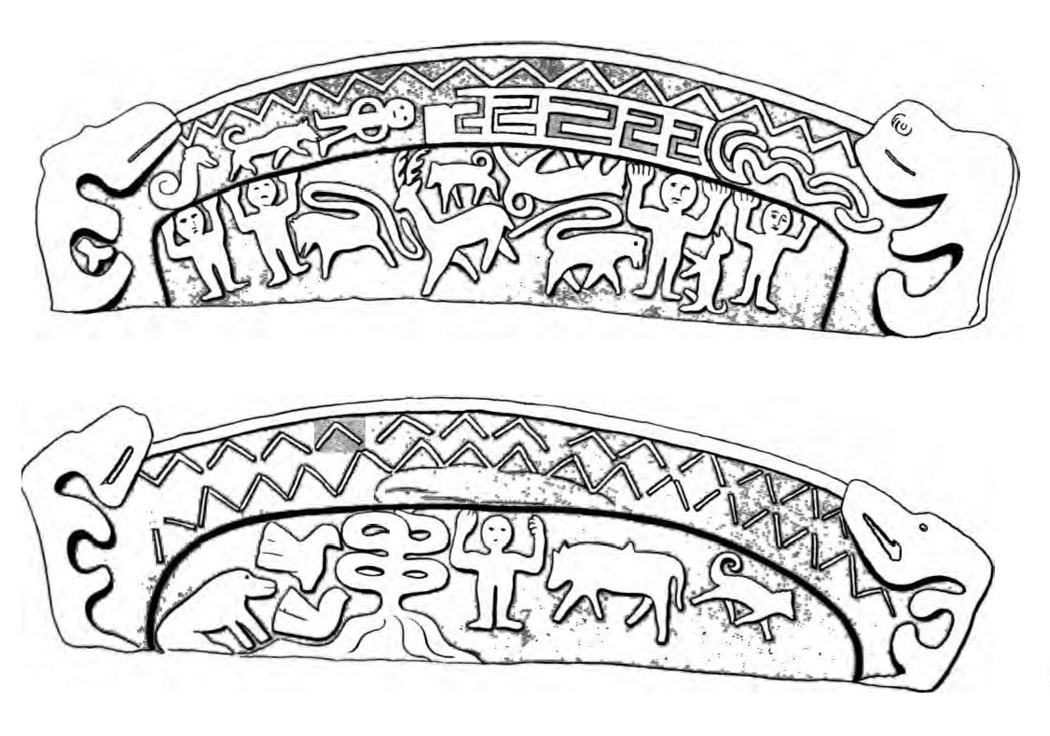
Faces of the hogback stone

== See also ==
- Listed buildings in Heysham
