= The Best of Black Sabbath =

Greatest hits album by Black Sabbath
- Released: 5 June 2000
- Recorded: 1969–1983
- Genres: Heavy metal; blues rock
- Length: 158:24
- Labels: Sanctuary; Castle Communications/Metal-Is
- Producers: Black Sabbath; Rodger Bain; Patrick Meehan; Mike Butcher; Martin Birch; Robin Black

Black Sabbath chronology
Reunion (1998)	The Best of Black Sabbath (2000)	Past Lives (2002)

The Best of Black Sabbath is a compilation album by the English heavy metal band Black Sabbath, released in 2000 on the Sanctuary Records label. Its 32 songs are presented chronologically from the band's first 11 studio albums, spanning the years 1970 to 1983. Black Sabbath's classic six-album run, from their debut Black Sabbath (1970) to Sabotage (1975), is represented by three to six songs from each album. Original vocalist Ozzy Osbourne's subsequent final two albums with the band, Technical Ecstasy (1976) and Never Say Die! (1978), are represented by one and two songs, respectively. Replacement Ronnie James Dio's early 1980s stint fronting the band on two albums is acknowledged with the title track of Heaven and Hell (1980) and a track from The Mob Rules (1981). The compilation closes with a song from the band's attempted rebirth, Born Again (1983), former Deep Purple vocalist Ian Gillan's sole album with the band. The Best of Black Sabbath does not include any later material with vocalists Glenn Hughes (1986's Seventh Star), Tony Martin (1986–96) or the returning Dio (1992's Dehumanizer).

As this compilation was released by a record label not associated with Black Sabbath or their management, it is not considered an official Black Sabbath release, and isn't in their official catalogue. There have been roughly half a dozen compilations released throughout Black Sabbath's career titled The Best of Black Sabbath. None of them are official band releases.

The compilation was released on double CD, quadruple LP and double cassette formats.

== Artwork ==
Pictured in the foreground on the compilation's front cover are four water-filled stone-hewn graves. Dating back to the 11th century, they are located at St Patrick's Chapel, Heysham, Lancashire, North West England, overlooking Morecambe Bay. Superimposed onto one of the graves is a silhouette of a winged figure, the Black Sabbath mascot known as "Henry", a devil/demon or fallen angel used in various merchandise. In the background of the scene the sun is setting, so apparently it is at dusk. It has a "The Best of Black Sabbath" title which appears in a Greek style font. On the back of the booklet (which contains extensive liner notes, penned by Hugh Gilmour, and credits) there is a silhouette of band member Geezer Butler playing bass guitar in the moonlight.

== Critical reception ==
Professional ratings
Review scores
Source	Rating
AllMusic	4.5/5 stars

In a review of The Best of Black Sabbath for AllMusic, Greg Prato wrote that it was "undoubtedly one of the best [Black Sabbath] collections to surface", saying that "What makes [the compilation] such an appealing one is that it manages to include all the favorites, as well as a multitude of oft-overlooked (but just as strong and classic) album cuts." He concluded the review by opining that "Few Sabbath compilations manage to cover all the bases like Sanctuary's 'Best of Black Sabbath' does."

== Track listing ==
All tracks written by Tony Iommi, Geezer Butler, Ozzy Osbourne and Bill Ward, except where noted.

Double CD version

Disc One
No.	Title	Writer(s)	Original album	Length
1.	"Black Sabbath"		Black Sabbath (1970)	6:19
2.	"The Wizard"		Black Sabbath	4:23
3.	"N.I.B."		Black Sabbath	6:05
4.	"Evil Woman (Don't Play Your Games with Me)"	Dick Wagner; Dick Wiegand; Larry Wiegand	Black Sabbath	3:20
5.	"Wicked World"		Black Sabbath	4:45
6.	"War Pigs"		Paranoid (1970)	7:56
7.	"Paranoid"		Paranoid	2:49
8.	"Planet Caravan"		Paranoid	4:26
9.	"Iron Man"		Paranoid	5:56
10.	"Electric Funeral"		Paranoid	4:47
11.	"Fairies Wear Boots"		Paranoid	6:13
12.	"Sweet Leaf"		Master of Reality (1971)	5:04
13.	"Embryo"	Iommi	Master of Reality	0:28
14.	"Children of the Grave"		Master of Reality	5:15
15.	"Lord of This World"		Master of Reality	5:26
16.	"Into the Void"		Master of Reality	6:10

Disc Two
No.	Title	Writer(s)	Original album	Length
1.	"Tomorrow's Dream"		Vol. 4 (1972)	3:08
2.	"Supernaut"		Vol. 4	4:43
3.	"Snowblind"		Vol. 4	5:27
4.	"Sabbath Bloody Sabbath"		Sabbath Bloody Sabbath (1973)	5:44
5.	"Killing Yourself to Live"		Sabbath Bloody Sabbath	5:38
6.	"Spiral Architect"		Sabbath Bloody Sabbath	5:31
7.	"Hole in the Sky"		Sabotage (1975)	3:59
8.	"Don't Start (Too Late)"		Sabotage	0:47
9.	"Symptom of the Universe"		Sabotage	6:30
10.	"Am I Going Insane (Radio)"		Sabotage	4:17
11.	"Dirty Women"		Technical Ecstasy (1976)	7:09
12.	"Never Say Die"		Never Say Die! (1978)	3:49
13.	"A Hard Road"		Never Say Die!	6:03
14.	"Heaven and Hell"	Ronnie James Dio; Butler; Ward; Iommi	Heaven and Hell (1980)	6:53
15.	"Turn Up the Night"	Dio; Butler; Iommi	Mob Rules (1981)	3:40
16.	"The Dark/Zero the Hero" (Edited version)	Ian Gillan; Butler; Ward; Iommi	Born Again (1983)	5:44

== Personnel ==
1969–1979 Disc One tracks 1–16; Disc Two tracks 1–13

The albums that this line-up is featured on are Black Sabbath, Paranoid, Master of Reality, Vol. 4, Sabbath Bloody Sabbath, Sabotage, Technical Ecstasy, and Never Say Die!.

- Ozzy Osbourne – vocals, harmonica (Disc One track 2), synthesiser (Disc Two track 5)
- Tony Iommi – guitars, piano, synthesiser, cough (Disk One track 12), bagpipes (Disk Two track 6)
- Geezer Butler – bass, fuzz bass (Disk Two Track 4), noise (disk Two track 6)
- Bill Ward – drums, congas (Disk One track 8), timpani (Disk Two track 6)
- Rodger Bain – producer (Black Sabbath, Paranoid, and Master of Reality)
- Black Sabbath – producer (Vol. 4, Sabbath Bloody Sabbath, Sabotage, Technical Ecstasy, Never Say Die!)
- Patrick Meehan – co-producer (Vol. 4)
- Mike Butcher – co-producer (Sabotage, Technical Ecstasy, Never Say Die!)

1980 Disc Two track 14

The album that this line-up is featured on is Heaven and Hell.

- Ronnie James Dio – vocals
- Tony Iommi – guitars
- Geezer Butler – bass
- Bill Ward – drums
- Martin Birch – producer

1981–1982 Disc Two track 15

The album that this line-up is featured on is Mob Rules.

- Ronnie James Dio – vocals
- Tony Iommi – guitars
- Geezer Butler – bass
- Vinny Appice – drums
- Martin Birch – producer

1983–1984 Disc Two track 16

The album that this line-up is featured on is Born Again.

- Ian Gillan – vocals
- Tony Iommi – guitars
- Geezer Butler – bass
- Bill Ward – drums
- Black Sabbath – producer
- Robin Black – co-producer

== Charts ==
Chart (2000–2002)	Peak position
Australian Albums (ARIA)	41
Danish Albums (Hitlisten)	25
European Albums Chart	78
Finnish Albums (Suomen virallinen lista)	13
New Zealand Albums (RMNZ)	38
Norwegian Albums (VG-lista)	6
Scottish Albums (Official Charts)	28
Swedish Albums (Sverigetopplistan)	12
UK Albums (Official Charts)	24
UK Independent Albums (Official Charts)	6
UK Rock & Metal Albums (Official Charts)	2

== Certifications ==
Region	Certification	Certified units/sales
Australia (ARIA)	Platinum	70,000^{^}
United Kingdom (BPI)	Gold	100,000^{^}
^{^} Shipments figures based on certification alone.
