= St Patrick's Chapel, Heysham =

Ruined church in Lancashire, England

Coordinates: 54.04747°N 2.90269°W

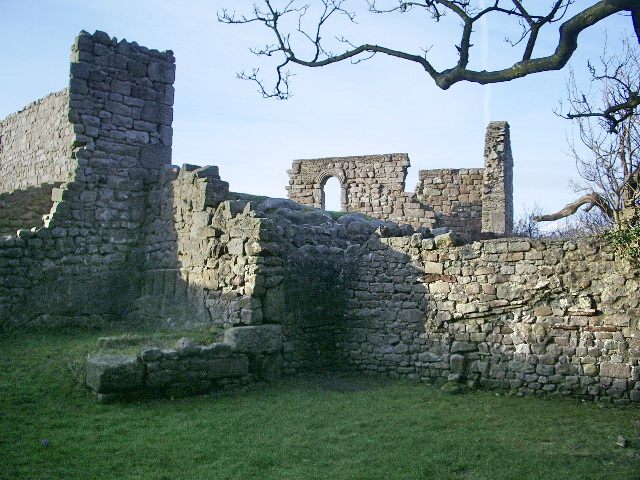
St Patrick's Chapel

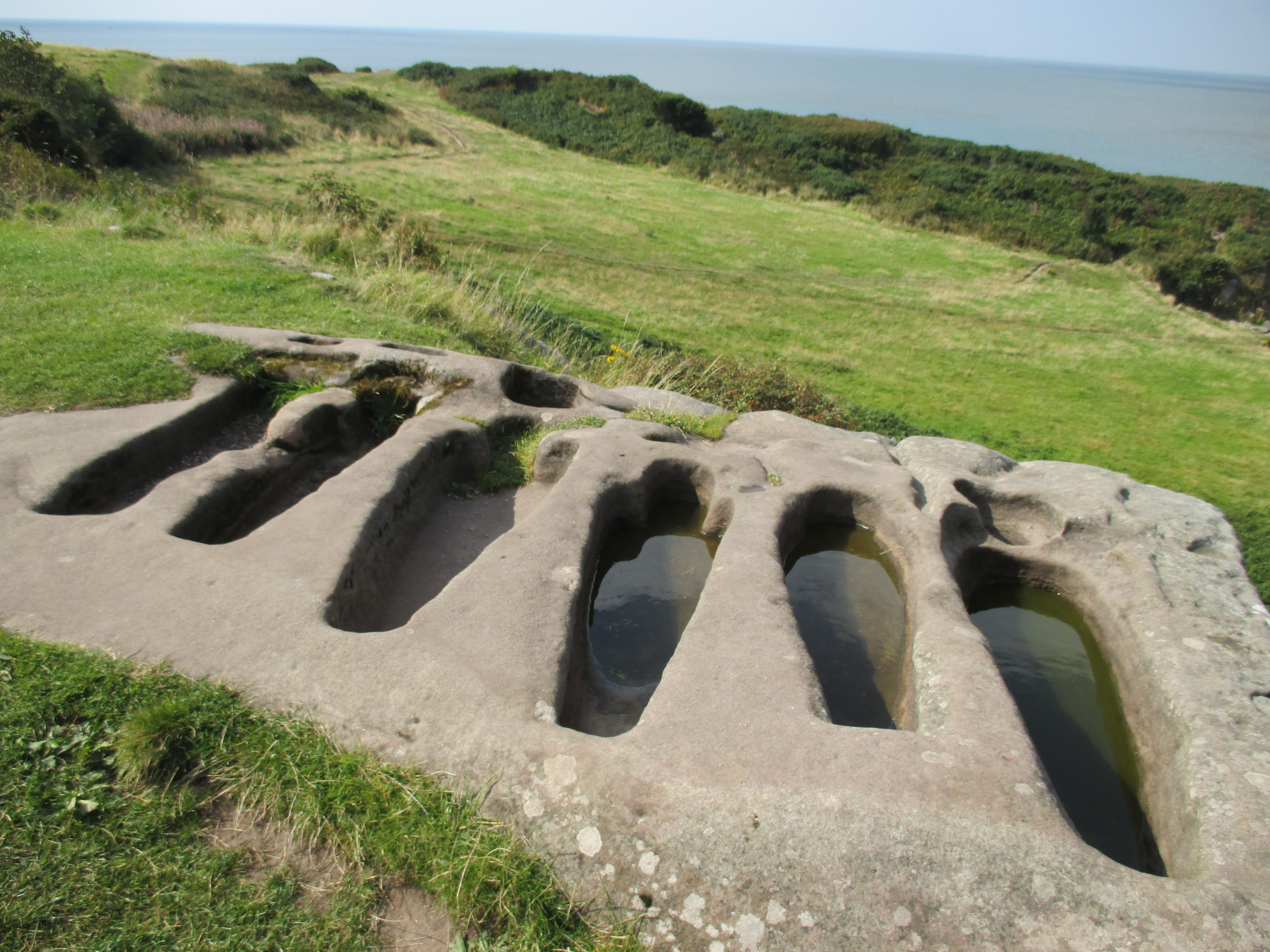
The group of six rock-cut tombs

St Patrick's Chapel is a ruined building that stands on a headland above St Peter's Church, in Heysham, Lancashire, England (grid reference SD409616). It is recorded in the National Heritage List for England as a designated Grade I listed building, and is a Scheduled Ancient Monument.

== Description ==
The ruin dates from the 8th or 9th century, and is built of sandstone rubble. The plan is a plain slightly tapering rectangle measuring 27 feet 6 inches (8 m) by 9 feet (3 m). Consolidation work was carried out in 1903 using stone tiles. Most of the south wall, the east gable wall, and the east part of the north wall are still present. The south wall contains a doorway with long-and-short jambs and an arch with concentric grooves.

Near the chapel is a group of six rock-cut tombs from the 11th century and a separate group of two rock-cut tombs. Each group is listed at Grade I, and each tomb has an associated socket probably intended for a timber cross. They featured on the cover of Black Sabbath's 2000 album The Best of Black Sabbath.

== Archaeology ==
In 1977 an excavation took place in and to the south of the chapel, which dated the site to the late 6th or early 7th century. This links the site to early Celtic Christianity when local people spoke native British. The buried skeletons uncovered were dated as no earlier than the 10th century. A further excavation took place in April 1993 on land below the stone coffins. No human bones were found but more than 1,200 artefacts were recovered, which showed that the site had been occupied about 12,000 years ago.

== See also ==
- Grade I listed churches in Lancashire
- Grade I listed buildings in Lancashire
- Scheduled monuments in Lancashire
- Listed buildings in Heysham
