= Church of St Peter and St Paul, Ormskirk =

Coordinates: 53.5692°N 2.8877°W

Church of St Peter and St Paul
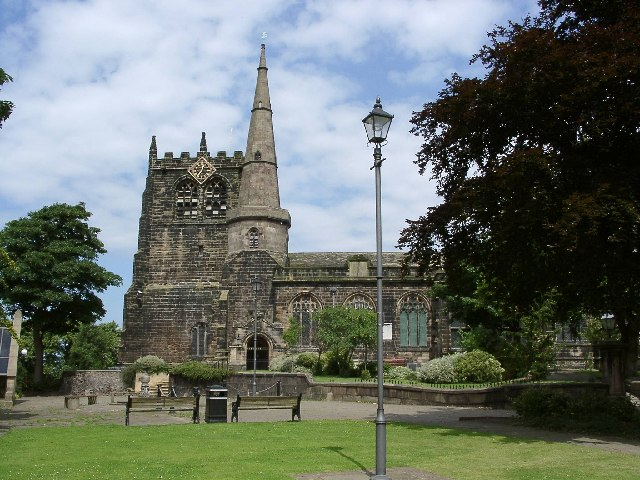

- Location in West Lancashire
- OS grid reference: SD 41306 08436
- Location: Ormskirk, Lancashire
- Country: England
- Denomination: Anglican

History
- Status: Parish church

Architecture
- Functional status: Active
- Heritage designation: Grade II*
- Designated: 11 May 1953

Administration
- Province: York
- Diocese: Liverpool
- Archdeaconry: Wigan & West Lancashire
- Deanery: Ormskirk

The Church of St Peter and St Paul is in the market town of Ormskirk, Lancashire, England. Dating from no later than the 12th century, it is one of only three churches in England to have both a tower and spire, and the only one to have them both at the same end of the church. It is an active Anglican parish church in the Diocese of Liverpool. The church is recorded in the National Heritage List for England as a designated Grade II* listed building.

== History ==
The exact date of the foundation of a church in Ormskirk is unclear, although it is likely that there was a church on the site of the present one in Saxon time. The Anglican parish of Ormskirk encompassed the settlements of Lathom, Burscough, Bickerstaffe, Scarisbrick and Skelmersdale. Parts of the present church existed in the 12th century, although the building has been altered and added to over successive centuries. The earliest part of the building is the north wall of the chancel, which dates from c. 1170 and contains a heavily restored Norman window. On the south of the chancel are two arches dating from c.1280, which formerly led into a chapel of the same date. The sixteenth-century Derby Chapel now occupies the same site.

The next surviving feature is the 15th-century steeple, though the spire was rebuilt in both 1790 and 1832. The Scarisbrick Chapel to the south-west of the chancel is probably 15th century, and the large west tower was built c.1540–50. This tower was built to house four bells from Burscough Priory, which had been suppressed c.1536 as part of Henry VIII's dissolution of the monasteries. Ormskirk is one of only three churches in England to have both a tower and a spire. (Note: The other churches with both a western tower and a central spire are in Wiltshire; St Mary's Church in Purton and St Andrew's Church in Wanborough.) Scars on the interior east walls of the steeple and tower show the original width of the nave and aisles; the current south arcade is further north than the original one, which was approximately in line with the north wall of the steeple.

The final Gothic work in the church is the Derby Chapel, built in the second half of the sixteenth century. In 1729 the nave was reconstructed in the neoclassical style, including the arcades. This work was almost entirely destroyed between 1877 and 1891 during an extensive restoration by the Lancaster architects Paley and Austin. The north arcade was entirely rebuilt, the nave arcades reconstructed in the Gothic style, and the windows of the south aisle replaced. The firm also refloored, re-roofed and reseated the church, installed a new heating system, and removed the galleries. Many of the features and details of the church are consequently Victorian.

== Architecture ==
=== Exterior ===
The church is situated on a raised piece of land in the north-west of the town. Mostly in the Perpendicular Gothic style, it is constructed of coursed squared sandstone, with stone slate roofs. It has a nave, with aisles to the north and south. The steeple is built at the west end of the south aisle. It is one of a distinctive group of four local steeples which move from a square tower to an octagonal spire by means of a broached octagonal belfry. (Note: The others are St Cuthbert, Halsall, St Michael, Aughton, and St Wilfrid, Standish, though the latter is nineteenth-century.) The bell louvres are Decorated Gothic, and the whole structure is approximately 109 feet (33 m) high. The large square tower is approximately 84 feet (26 m) high and 40 feet (12 m) square; it has three unequal stages and diagonal buttresses. The upper-most stage has a crenellated parapet and crocketed pinnacles. The tower has arched three-light belfry windows with stone louvres and uncusped intersecting tracery, a characteristic of local 16th century gothic. The gothic windows of the nave aisles are a result of Paley and Austin's restoration, though the sundial, plinth, and parapet are still classical.

To the north of the building is the chancel and vestry. The Scarisbrick Chapel is to the south, and the Derby Chapel to the south-east. The chapels can be distinguished from each other externally by the difference in their window tracery.

In his Passages from the English Notebooks of 1876, Nathaniel Hawthorne commented that the church "has not exactly a venerable aspect, being too good in repair, and much restored in various parts".

=== Interior and fittings ===
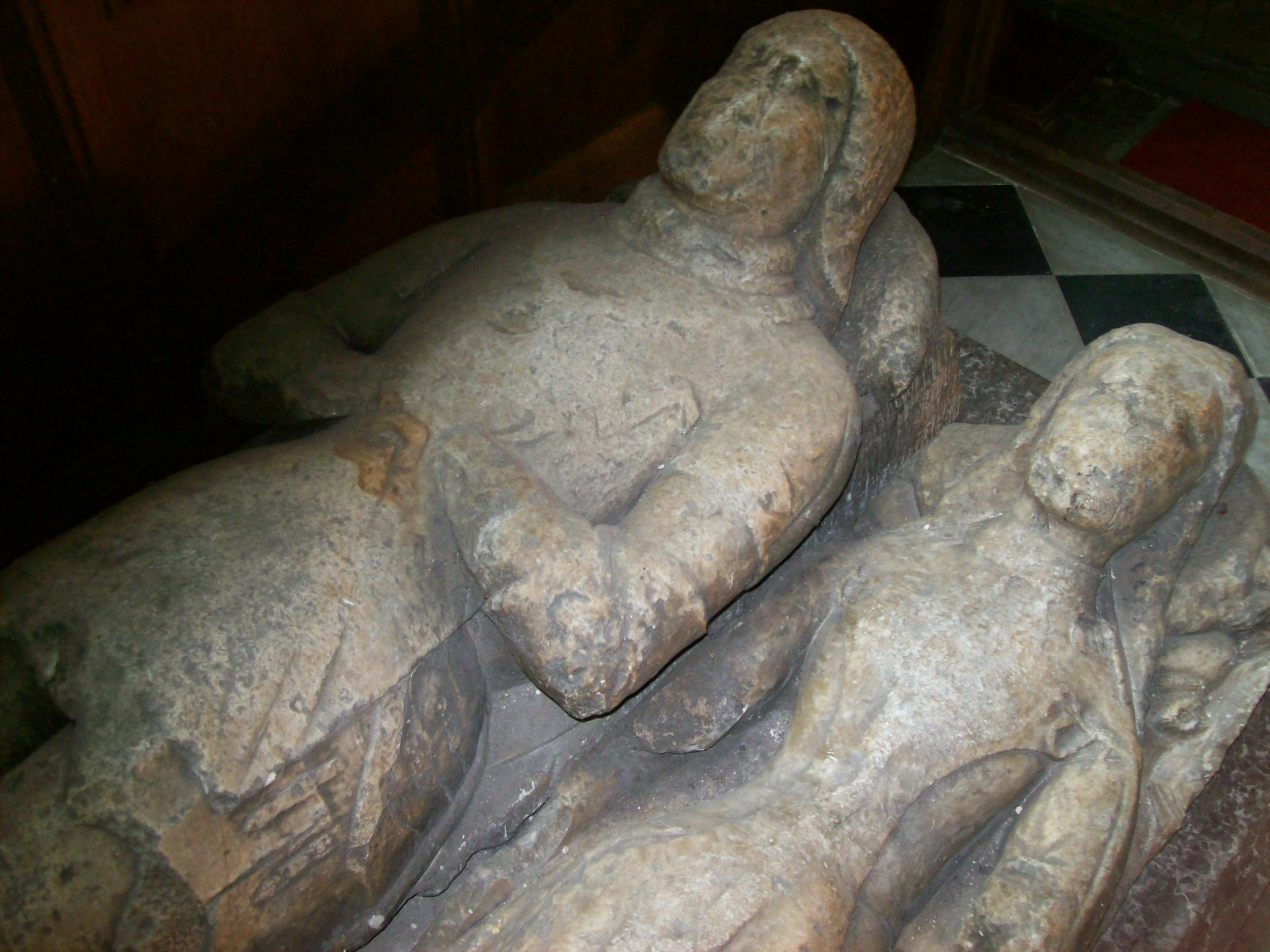
Two of the effigies in the church

The nave's ceiling is of wood and has carved hammerbeam trusses. The five-bay aisle arcades have moulded piers and two-centred arches. Between the steeple and the south aisle there is a chamfered arch. The vestry has in its western wall, an unglazed window that opens into the north aisle. It has a square head and original iron stanchions and saddle bars.

The Derby Chapel is enclosed to the north and west by a 17th-century wooden screen with high balusters and wrought iron fleur-de-lis cresting. The chapel also contains three alabaster Derby effigies (probably to Thomas Stanley, 1st Earl of Derby and his two wives) and two tomb chests. The Scarisbrick Chapel contains a hatchment and a wall monument. James Stanley, 7th Earl of Derby is also buried at the church.

The church has a ring of eight bells hung for change ringing, all cast in 1948 by John Taylor & Co of Loughborough. It also houses a bell cast in 1576 by Henry Oldfield of Nottingham, but this is no longer in use.

== Other burials ==
- Edward Stanley, 3rd Earl of Derby, in the Derby Chapel
- Henry Stanley, 4th Earl of Derby, in the Derby Chapel
- Ferdinando Stanley, 5th Earl of Derby, in the Derby Chapel
- William Stanley, 6th Earl of Derby, in the Derby Chapel
- Charles Stanley, 8th Earl of Derby, in the Derby Chapel
- William Stanley, 9th Earl of Derby, in the Derby Chapel
- James Stanley, 10th Earl of Derby, in the Derby Chapel
- Edward Stanley, 11th Earl of Derby, in the Derby Chapel

== External features ==
The churchyard contains the war graves of 15 Commonwealth service personnel of World War I, and 12 of World War II. Also buried here is Second Boer War Victoria Cross recipient William Edward Heaton (1875–1941).

== See also ==
- Grade II* listed buildings in Lancashire
- Listed buildings in Ormskirk
- List of ecclesiastical works by Paley and Austin
