= St Mary's Church, Purton =

Coordinates: 51.5833°N 1.8616°W

St Mary's, Purton
- Church of St Mary the Virgin
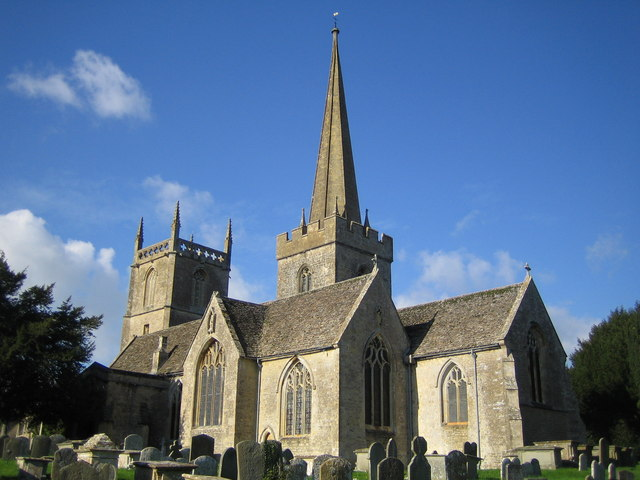

- Location in Wiltshire
- OS grid reference: SU 09684 87173
- Location: Purton, Wiltshire
- Country: England
- Denomination: Anglican
- Website: www.stmaryspurton.org.uk

History
- Status: Parish church

Architecture
- Functional status: Active
- Heritage designation: Grade I
- Designated: 17 January 1955

Administration
- Province: Canterbury
- Diocese: Bristol
- Archdeaconry: Malmesbury
- Deanery: Swindon

St Mary's Church in the village of Purton in north Wiltshire, England, is an active Church of England parish church in the Diocese of Bristol. A large building begun in the 13th century and one of only three churches in England to have both a western tower and a central spire, it has been designated as a Grade I listed building by English Heritage.

== Location ==
Purton is about 4 miles (6 km) north-west of the large town of Swindon, and a similar distance south of Cricklade. Nikolaus Pevsner describes the church as "beautifully placed"; it stands separate from and to the south of the present-day village, next to the 16th-century manor house.

== History ==
Malmesbury Abbey may have built a church on its Purton estate before the Norman Conquest, although no church is recorded in the Domesday survey of 1086. A church at Purton was listed among the abbey's possessions in 1151, and was appropriated by the abbey in 1276; at that time a vicarage had recently been built. The quality of the construction and interior adornment of the church may reflect the wealth of Malmesbury Abbey.

The crudely carved capital of the east respond of the south arcade may be from the 12th century. The nave was built in the early 13th century, and in the next century the crossing tower, transepts and south-east chapel were added and the arcades rebuilt, wider and higher, making the nave unusually tall. The chancel dates from the late 13th century. The west tower, called "ambitious" by Pevsner, is 15th-century; the upper stage and slender octagonal spire over the crossing may be 14th-century or 15th.

Restoration was carried out in 1872 by William Butterfield, when three walls of the chancel were rebuilt. At this time a skeleton was discovered in a wall of the north transept.

== Architecture ==
The church is constructed of coursed rubble limestone, with roofs of slate and lead. Its plan consists of a three-bay nave with aisles, a tower to the west and a transept. Above the crossing is a steeple. There is a chancel, and a porch to the south with an upper storey heated by a fireplace.

The west tower, which has the entrance to the church, has angled buttresses and three stages; the upper stage has three-light belfry louvres, with perforated stone screens. The tower has crocketed pinnacles at its corners and a stair turret to the north corner. There are a number of niches, and in 1973 figures by Simon Verity were installed in niches on the north and south sides.

The central steeple has two-light belfry louvres and a crenellated parapet. The spire is octagonal. St Mary's is one of only three churches in England to have both a western tower and a central spire. (Note: The other churches with both a western tower and a central spire are St Andrew's Church in Wanborough, Wiltshire and the Church of St Peter and St Paul in Ormskirk, Lancashire.)

The church houses a ring of eight bells hung for change ringing and a Sanctus bell. The first and second bells (the lightest) were cast in 1989, and the seventh in 1916 by John Taylor & Co of Loughborough; the third and fifth by Gillett & Johnston of Croydon in 1924 and 1923 respectively; the fourth by Robert Wells II in 1793; the sixth by Joseph Carter in 1598, the largest bell known to have been cast by this founder; and the tenor (heaviest) by Abel Rudhall of Gloucester in 1738. Rudhall also made the Sanctus bell, cast in 1760.

The windows are three- and four-light, in the Perpendicular style, mostly dating from the 15th century. The window in the north aisle is reticulated and the east window in the chapel to the south is curvilinear. The chancel has two-light casement windows.

== Interior ==
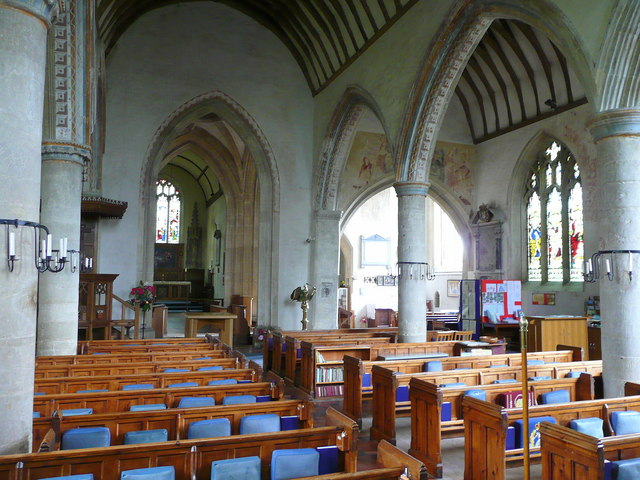
Interior of the church

While the exterior of the building is largely Perpendicular in style, Pevsner writes that the church is "very different inside from what the outside indicates". Both inside and outside, the church has many niches and corbels where statuettes would have been placed, some with elaborate canopies. The east wall of the north transept has two 14th-century carved heads.

The plain octagonal font is 13th-century. In the chancel is an Early English piscina (a basin near the altar). The chapel south of the chancel contains a decorated piscina.

Coloured patterns on the arcade arches were restored in 1872. Throughout the church are fragments of medieval wall paintings. On the south wall of the south chapel (the Lady Chapel) is a 14th-century painting of the Death of Mary. The reredos has a 17th-century Flemish painting of the Last Supper, given by Mary, dowager Countess of Shaftesbury in 1782. There are fragments of old stained glass in the windows of the north aisle, and many more were assembled in 1927 in the south window of the south chapel. The 1883 glass in the chancel is by Clayton and Bell.

== Monuments ==
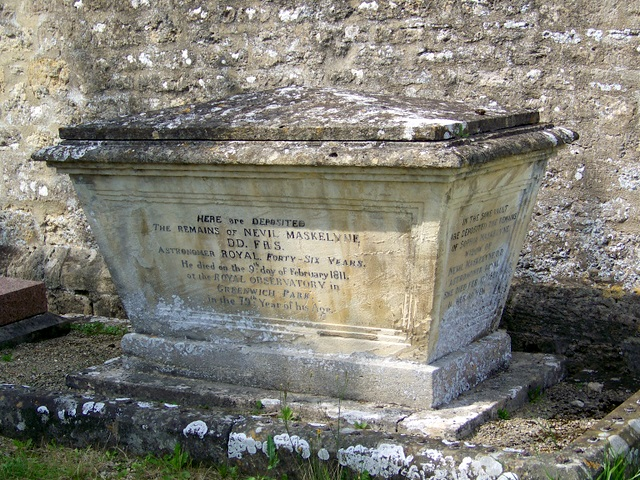
Tomb of Nevil Maskelyne (1732–1811), Astronomer Royal

The church is the burial place of several members of the Maskelyne family, landowners since the 15th century. Among the wall monuments in the church, are three to Maskelynes in the south transept: Nevil Maskelyne MP (1679, black and white marble with cherubs); Nevil Maskelyne, the fifth Astronomer Royal (1811, grey marble); and Anthony Maskelyne, barrister (1879, alabaster). The limestone chest tomb of the Astronomer Royal is outside the south transept.

== Records ==
The surviving parish registers date from 1558 for marriages and burials, 1564 for baptisms; there are gaps between 1641 and 1647 which coincide more or less with the disruptions of the Civil War.
