= Horpit =

Hamlet in Wiltshire, England

Coordinates: 51.556°N 1.695°W

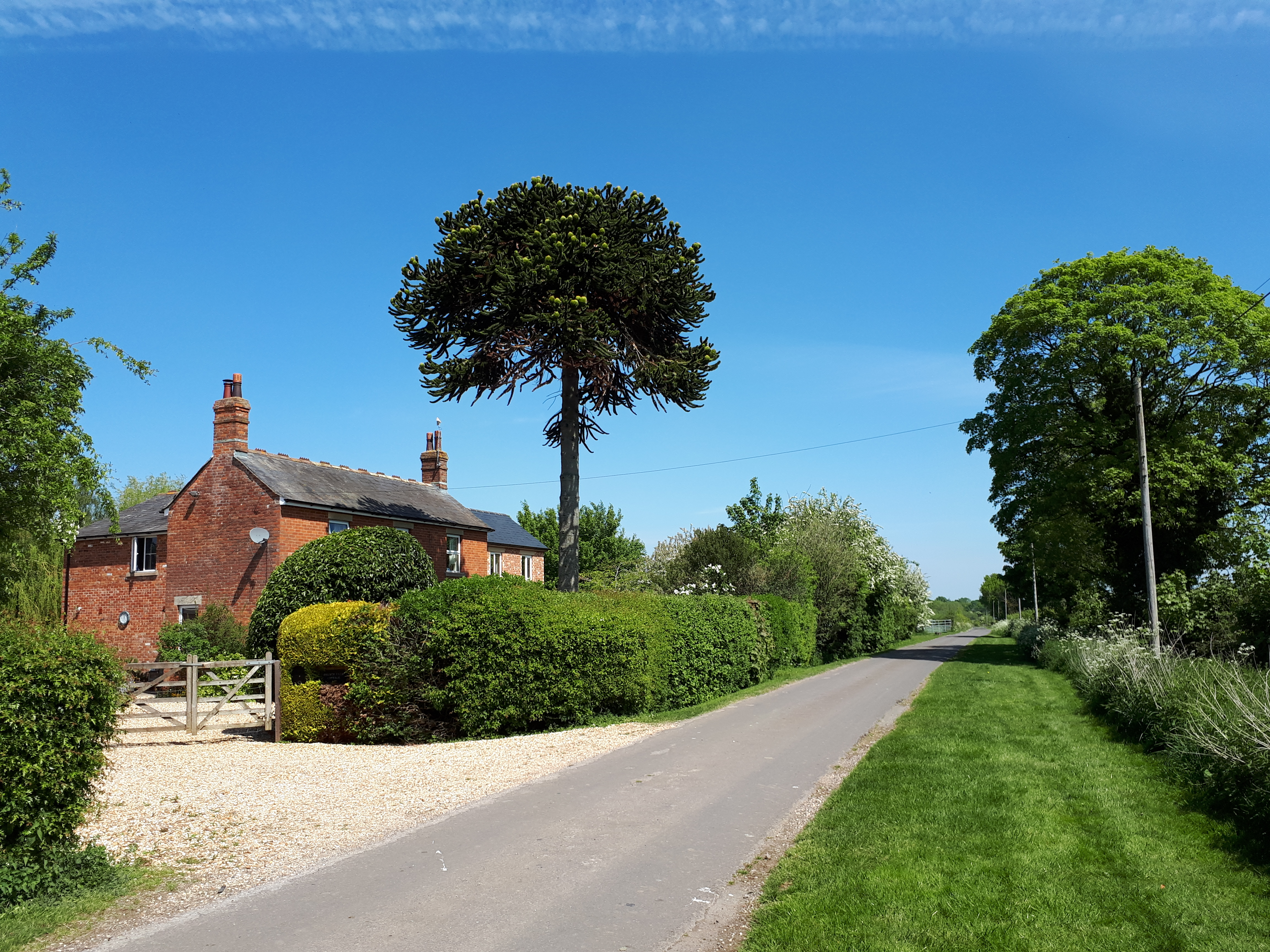
Breach Farm Cottage in Horpit

Horpit is an agricultural hamlet in the parish of Wanborough in the north-eastern corner of Wiltshire county, England.

Horpit lies in the clay vale to the northwest of the Marlborough Downs.
