= Old Town Hall, Ormskirk =

Building in Ormskirk, Lancashire, England

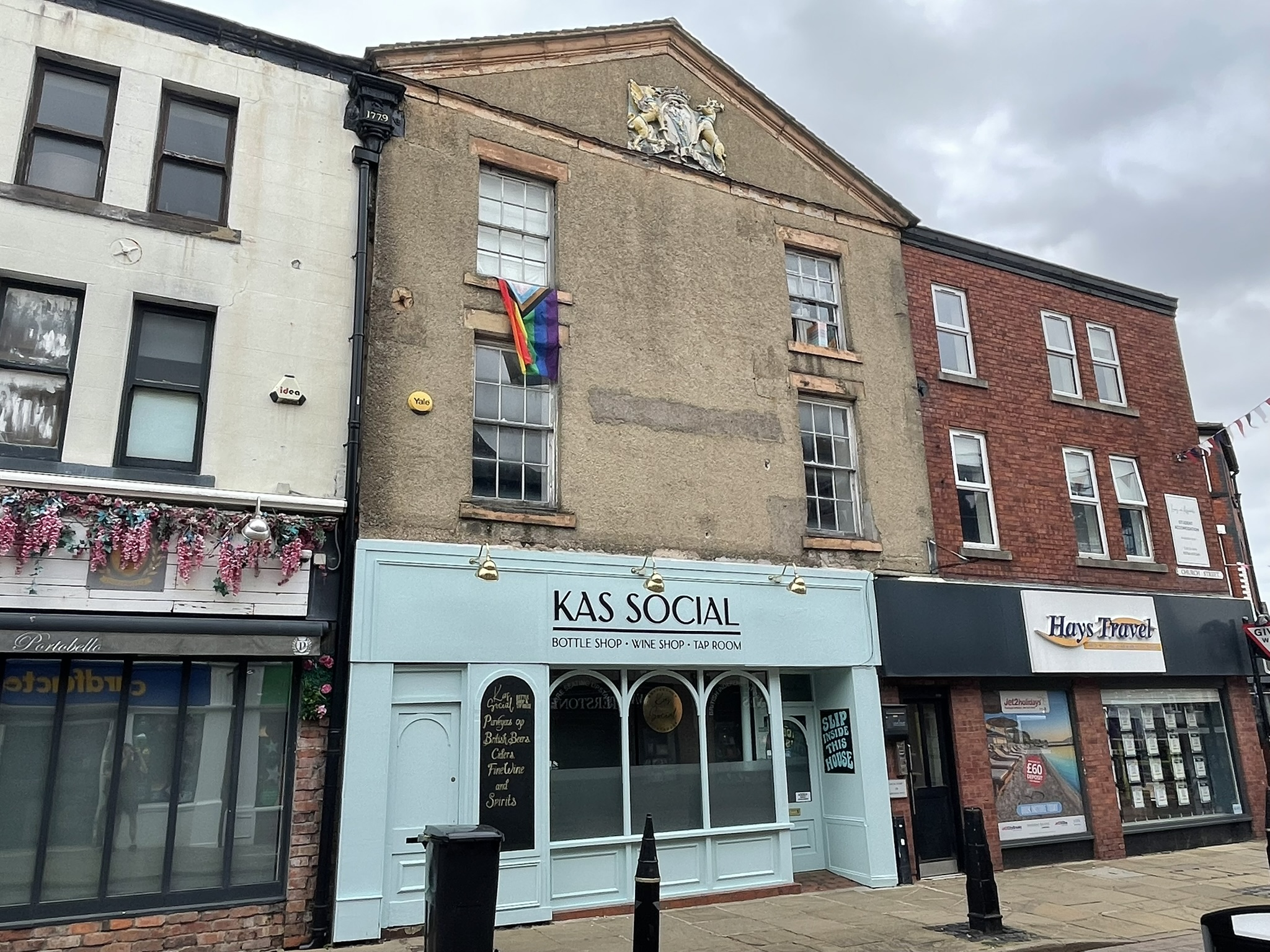
- The building in July 2025

- Shown in Lancashire
- 53°34′03″N 2°53′10″W
- Location: Ormskirk, Lancashire

History
- Built: 1779

Site notes
- Architectural style: Neoclassical style

Listed Building – Grade II
- Official name: 2 Church Street
- Designated: 11 August 1972
- Reference no.: 1297311

The Old Town Hall is a former municipal building at 2 Church Street in Ormskirk, a town in Lancashire, England. The building, which was the meeting place of the court leet, has since been converted for retail use. It is a Grade II listed building.

== History ==
The building was commissioned to replace an earlier structure. The site chosen, which is now 2 Church Street, was land which was donated by the lord of the manor, Edward Smith-Stanley, 12th Earl of Derby, whose seat was at Knowsley Hall. It was designed in the neoclassical style, built in brick with a cement render finish and was completed in 1779. The design involved a symmetrical main frontage of two bays facing onto Church Street. Initially, the upper floors contained formal rooms where the manor court and the court leet met, while the ground floor housed butchers' shops and a meal house, with slaughterhouses to the rear. The building was altered internally in the 19th century, when the windows were also changed. During this period, the building contained an events space with a stage and orchestra pit.

The administration of the town was vested in the court leet, which acted on behalf of the lord of the manor, until the mid-19th century. However, following significant population growth, largely associated with status of Ormskirk as a market town, a local board of health was established in Ormskirk in 1850. The local board of health established its offices in the Exchange Rooms in Railway Road, while the Ormskirk Urban District Council, which replaced the local board of health in 1894, established its offices in the old Bank at the top of Burscough Street.

The old town hall was therefore converted for alternative use and by the 1880s, it was being used as a drill hall by two companies of the 13th Lancashire Rifle Volunteers, which evolved to become the 3rd Volunteer Battalion, The King's Regiment (Liverpool). The regiment continued to use the old town hall until the civic hall in Southport Road was completed in 1899.

The building was subsequently converted for retail use and a shop front was inserted on the ground floor. The building was Grade II listed in 1972. By the early 21st century, the ground floor was occupied by a firm of estate agents, Farrell Heyworth. In 2022, the ground and first floors were converted for use as the Kas Social taproom and bottle shop.

== Architecture ==
The three-storey building is constructed of rendered brick, with a tiled roof. The street front has a pediment displaying the coat of arms of Edward Smith-Stanley. The arms were carved in Liverpool and transported along the recently opened Leeds and Liverpool Canal to near the site. There are two 19th-century windows on each of the upper floors, and a drainpipe head with the initials ED for the Earl of Derby, and the date 1779.

== See also ==
- Listed buildings in Ormskirk
