= Burscough Priory Academy =

Coordinates: 53.6013°N 2.8476°W

- Burscough, Lancashire, L40 7RZ; England

Information
- Type: Academy
- Motto: E Pluribus Unum ("Out of Many, One")
- Established: June 1958
- Local authority: Lancashire
- Trust: Endeavour Learning Trust
- Department for Education URN: 146282 Tables
- Ofsted: Reports
- CEO: L Gwinnett
- Head teacher: L MacLaren
- Staff: 75
- Age: 11 to 16
- Enrolment: 700
- Website: http://www.burscoughprioryacademy.org/

Burscough Priory Academy is an Academy in Burscough, Lancashire, England. It officially opened on 10 June 1958 as Burscough County Secondary School under the Headship of Brian Stone, and cost just over £120,000 to build. The then Edward Stanley, 18th Earl of Derby (1918–1994) presided over the ceremony. At the time of opening, the school's staff of 10 teachers looked after 222 pupils.

The school's motto E Pluribus Unum (Out of Many, One), which is also the motto of the United States, was thought to be appropriate as the new school was created from several all-age schools from around the area. The academy's intake is around 700 students and caters for 11-to 16-year-olds, with 90 members of staff.

== History ==
=== Planning and construction ===
Several years prior to construction, a report commissioned by the Divisional Executive Education Committee accepted that Burscough had a "good case" for a secondary modern school "in the very early future". Skelmersdale also proposed a need for a new secondary modern school too, however existing provision in the area meant that the need in that area was not considered as pressing. Burscough's case was also considered a higher priority due to the situation at Skelmersdale having been alleviated upon them taking over Mission School, despite trustees being reassured that the takeover would not hinder hopes of a new school. A secondary modern for Burscough, with a proposed three-form entry, was put top of the list in Lancashire's building programme for the year 1954 to 1955.

Residents of Burscough in 1954 had expressed concern at the lack of educational facilities in the area and the surrounding outlying districts. Proposals to build the school had been included in the 1955-1956 building programme but in 1954, were relegated to the "reserve list". Despite this, proposals to build a new school in Burscough later passed and it was originally to be named Ormskirk Burscough County Secondary School, until protests by council representatives were successful in having the "Ormskirk" dropped from the title. Mr W A Dean, divisional education officer, explained the standard practice in prefixing "Ormskirk" to all schools located in the urban district. The eventual decision not to include Ormskirk in the school's name was the original recommendation approved by the Divisional Executive. Councillor Truscott expressed that the matter was of "great issue", particularly as the school was something the village had never had before. The original school was designed to educate a maximum of 300 students, but numbers rose to 450 before any extensions were added.

=== Operation ===
The school, which cost £120,000 to build, was designed to accommodate around 300 pupils and originally occupied 13 acres (53,000 m^{2}) of space, of which just over 8 acres (32,000 m^{2}) was developed into playing fields and sport facilities. The school building comprised a two-storey building with 8 classrooms and 6 practical rooms, amongst changing rooms, a kitchen and hall-gymnasium. It was among the first schools in Lancashire to be built under a new scheme designed to reorganise secondary education in rural locations. The first headteacher was Mr Brian H. Stone, then aged 33 who had previously served as a deputy headteacher at Huyton Secondary Modern School, having been there since 1950. The school, which had been open for instruction since January 1958, was officially opened in June 1958 by Lord Derby.

By 1961, the school was overcrowded and considerations were made with regards to catering provision, in particular limiting a school lunch offering only to those who lived farthest away. Efforts to secure additional classrooms had failed due to budget cuts by the government in the education service, with the stage and dining room among spaces in the school that were repurposed as classrooms. Headmaster Brian Stone noted at a prize-giving ceremony that cuts to education funding meant they had not been able to secure "the much needed extra classrooms". However in the following year, the school put out a tender for the construction of two additional classrooms, also to include alterations to some existing buildings.

In 1967, there were plans to convert the school into a junior comprehensive school to cater for 11-14 year olds, which would have marked the end for the school as a secondary school. The proposals caused concern around the area, particularly at the prospect of children in Burscough needing to travel to Ormskirk, with over 1,200 Burscough parents signing a petition. Burscough councillor T. Tyrer noted that the "break in education at the age of 14" was not desirable and that the school was, at that time, less than ten years old with the necessary facilities and equipment to cater children up to the age of 16. A committee meeting in October 1967 had voted in favour of the school becoming a comprehensive school that could cater for students up to the age of 13 as an interim measure, with the expectation that from 14, students transfer to schools in Ormskirk. Other considerations were to convert the site into a primary school, while it was understood that significant extensions would be necessary if the decision to become a comprehensive school up to the age of 16 was decided. The uncertainty in the school's future meant that warning were issued about teachers who may seek appointments elsewhere, particularly if conversion to a primary school, which would have required "many adaptions" and wasted equipment, were to be realised. A petition during the latter part of 1967 collected around 1,200 signatures from those opposed to closing the school in its then present form. The school was later threatened with closure in 1969 under plans for comprehensive education, until a late reprieve in November 1969 due to an increase in pupil numbers.

Although small in size in comparison to other secondary comprehensive schools in West Lancashire, the school has seen several expansions since its construction. As well as a ROSLA building being constructed in the early 1970s which facilitated the increase in capacity to 750 pupils, the school was also extended in 1976. It then became known as Burscough Priory High School. During this time the roll expanded to over 800 pupils with the comprehensive intake.

Brian Stone retired in July 1984 and Eric Cole took on the role of acting headteacher for the autumn term in 1984 until the appointment of Roger Leighton as headteacher in January 1985. Leighton, then aged 36, came from Oswaldtwistle's Rhyddings High School where he had been a deputy headteacher, although had previously worked at nearby Glenburn High School for seven years as the head of geography.

The school was later extended again with the construction of a Performing Arts building, in response to gaining specialist Science College status. The school converted to an academy, sponsored by Endeavour Learning Trust from September 2018.

== Buildings ==
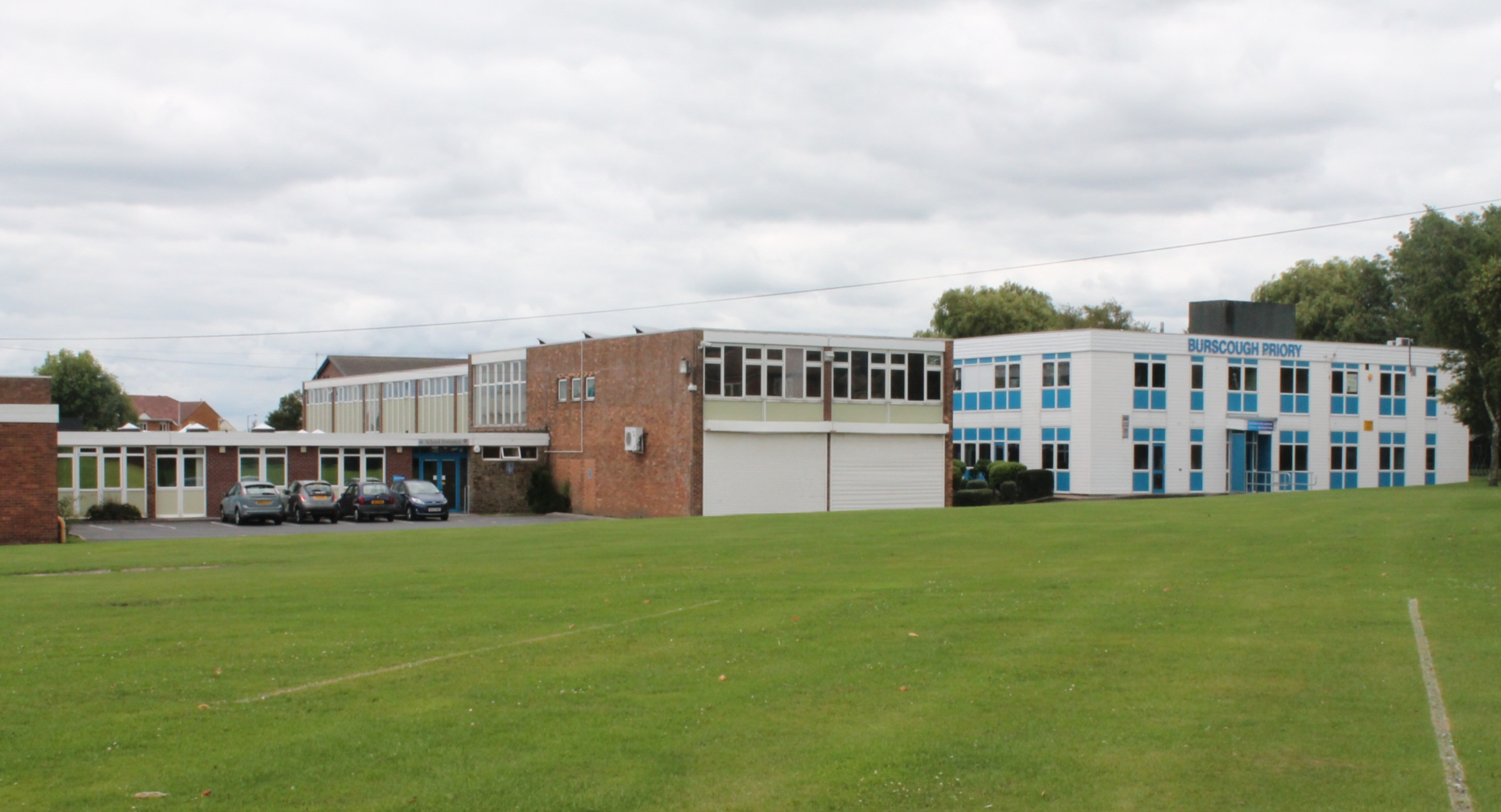
Burscough Priory Academy, pictured in 2013

The school's four buildings link to form a single school, split across two halves with a sheltered corridor providing an indoor connection between them.

=== Original building ===
The original building is where the modern school entrance and main corridors are, including classrooms on the upper floor. This was the original school until it was extended in 1972 and 1976 for the raising of school leaving age and for the comprehensive intake, respectively.

No extensive refurbishment has taken place in the original part of the school. A gymnasium was built during the 1970s, when headteacher Brian Stone had the option to build a swimming pool or a gymnasium, and chose the latter. The back of school also saw an extension of classrooms during the 1970s.

Lancashire County Council had suggested that recreational facilities planned to be included as part of the school's extensions programme in the early 1970s would only be on a "modest scale", despite a petition from angry Burscough residents who demanded better facilities.

=== The ROSLA Building ===
In 1972, a law was passed to increase the legal age at which a pupil could leave compulsory education from 15 to 16. As with many schools around the country, a ROSLA building was erected next the main school building, which is the first building seen upon entering the school premises. Upon opening in autumn 1972, it was described as having two laboratories, arts and crafts rooms and a fifth year centre.

Although intended to last for only around 15 years, the ROSLA building is still standing after 53–54 years. It accommodates the art and SEN departments, as well as a pastoral support centre on the ground floor with a smaller secondary cafeteria adjoined to it. Extensive refurbishment took place in 2016, with the removal of asbestos and a full redecoration.

=== Science and Performing Arts building ===
In September 2004, the school changed its name to Burscough Priory Science College to reflect gaining specialist school status in Science. The science and performing arts building was completed and in use in the same month, with the official opening occurring 8 months later on 25 May 2005, being named after the original headteacher as The Brian Stone Centre. It accommodates the newly built science laboratories on the ground floor, as well as the upper floor music & performing arts departments, comprising 2 large music rooms, several practice rooms and a drama studio.

This building was built on the location which housed the aging portable cabin classrooms.

== Solar panels ==
In 2008, Burscough Priory was one of 100 schools through the United Kingdom to have been chosen to receive solar panels worth £20000, half funded by the Co-op's £1m Green Energy for Schools Scheme. An LCD in the school entrance displays the total energy generated by the panels since installation (including real-time generation) and also the amount of greenhouse gases which have been prevented from entering the atmosphere.

== Conversion to Academy ==
The DfE confirmed in late August 2018 that the conversion from Burscough Priory Science College to Burscough Priory Academy was finalised for 1 September 2018. This confirmed that the school would be joining and be sponsored by Endeavour Learning Trust.

== Headmasters/headmistresses ==
- 1958-1984: Brian Stone was the first headteacher at the school, then called Burscough County Secondary School, having been head of the mathematics department at Huyton-with-Roby County Secondary School. He had a staff of 10 teachers and the total number of pupils on roll was 222. Stone retired in July 1984 after 26 years as headteacher, and has since died. The New Science and Performing arts building was officially named the "Brian Stone Centre" in memory of Brian.

Stone served in the R.A.F. during World War II as a radio mechanic. He graduated with a BSc at Nottingham University, gaining his teaching diploma in 1951. He was 33 years old when appointed to the position of headteacher.

- 1985-2009: Roger Leighton became the second headteacher at Burscough Priory High School in January 1985, and oversaw the school being awarded specialist status in Science in June 2004 and once again changing its name to Burscough Priory Science College. Roger retired in the summer of 2009, having served as headteacher for 24 years.
- 2020–present: Since the departure of Roger Leighton in 2009, various headteachers have led the school. The most recent is Mrs L MacLaren, appointed in January 2020.

== Notable former pupils ==
- Craig Winrow, former Olympic and Commonwealth middle-distance runner

== See also ==
- Burscough
- Burscough Priory
- Specialist school
