= Burscough Priory =

Priory in Lancashire, England

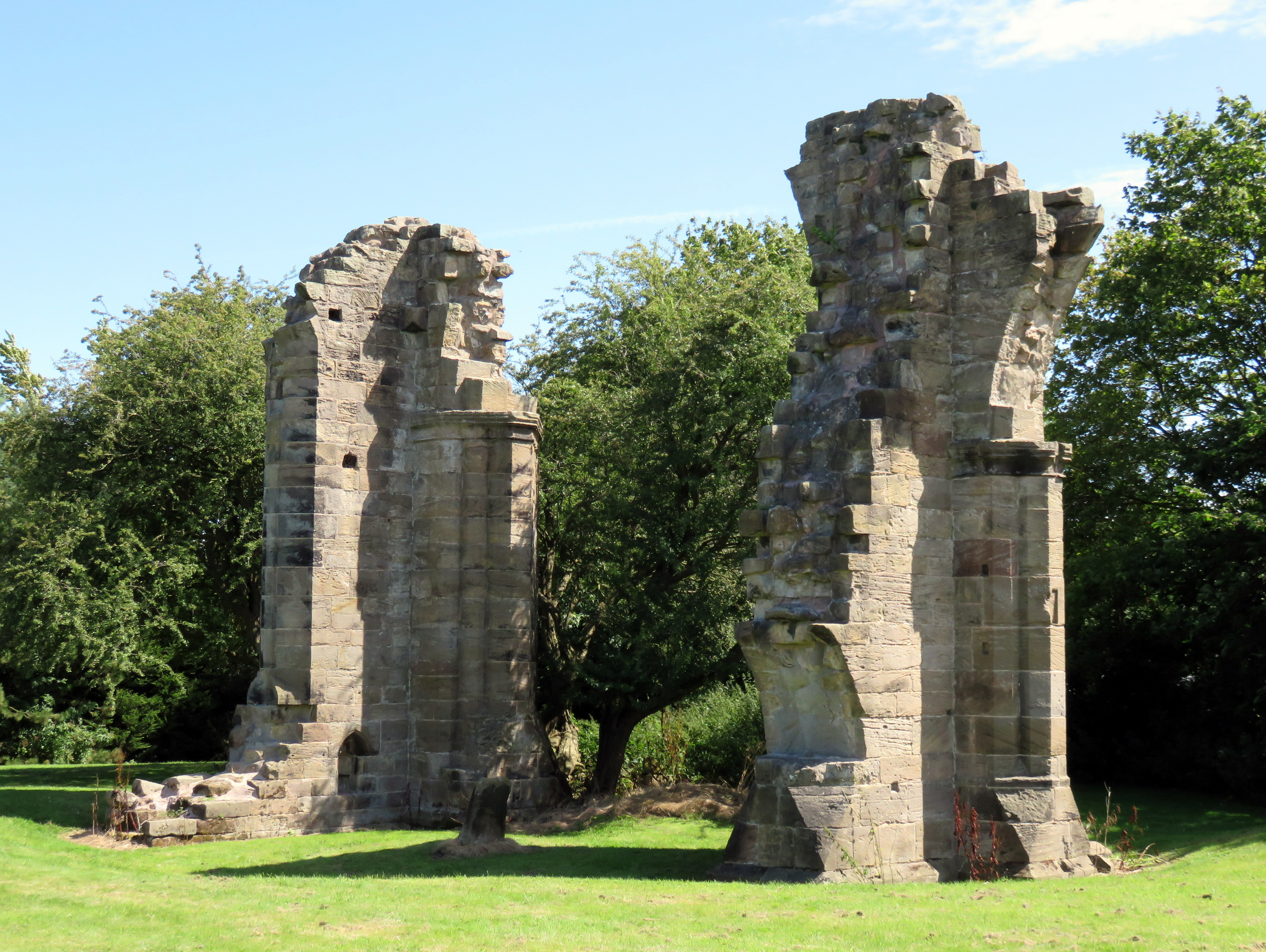
- Ruins of Burscough Priory

- Location within the Borough of West Lancashire

Monastery information
- Order: Augustinian
- Established: c. 1190
- Disestablished: 1536
- Dedication: St Nicholas

People
- Founder: Robert Fitz-Henry

Site
- Location: Burscough, Lancashire, England
- Coordinates: 53.5830°N 2.8563°W
- Grid reference: SD 43409 09944
- Visible remains: 2 piers and some foundations

Burscough Priory, at Burscough, Lancashire, England, was an Augustinian foundation, established in around 1190 and dissolved in around 1536. Some remains of the church survive.

== History ==
The priory was founded in c. 1190 by Robert Fitz-Henry, Lord of Lathom, for Augustinian canons. In 1390 the Lordship of the Manor and lands of Lathom passed to the Stanley family, several of whom were buried in the Priory, notably Sir Thomas Stanley, 1st Baron Stanley, K.G., of Lathom and Knowsley, in February 1459, his wife Joan in 1466, and their son Thomas Stanley, 1st Earl of Derby.

The priory was dedicated to St. Nicholas. There was an associated leper hospital. Fitz-Henry endowed it with land in Burscough, the entire adjoining township of Marton, the chapel of St. Leonard of Knowsley, all the mills on his demesne, and the patronage of three parish churches—at Ormskirk, Huyton, and Flixton. The ownership of Flixton however proved problematic. From the 1330s until the dissolution, the vicar of Ormskirk was always one of the canons of the priory. A royal charter that was granted by Edward I of England in 1286 to the monks at Burscough Priory permitted a regular market nearby in Ormskirk.

=== Dissolution ===
As a priory with an income of less than £200, it was dissolved under the act of February 1536. At the time of its surrender the religious community consisted of only five canons, including the prior. The Earl of Derby made attempts to save the church, in which many of his family had been buried, but they came to nothing and upon dissolution, many bodies were moved to Ormskirk which ever since has been the burial place of the Stanleys.

Following the dissolution eight bells from the Priory were moved to Ormskirk Parish Church, where a tower had to be built specially, as the existing steeple could not support them. The remaining bells were removed to Croston church. The tenor bell at the Ormskirk Church (the third bell from the Priory) has a Latin inscription which translates as "J.S. de Burscough, Esq., and E. my wife, made [this bell] in honour of the Trinity. R.B. 1497". It also bears the symbols of the rose, portcullis and Fleur-de-lis which suggests that the bell was presented in honour of a visit from Henry VII as these were some of his favourite badges.

The Priory gives its name to the local high school Burscough Priory Academy, which has an enrollment of around 700 pupils of ages 11–16 years.

== Other burials ==
- Sir John Stanley (died 1414)
- John I Stanley of the Isle of Man
- Joan Goushill Stanley, daughter of Elizabeth Fitzalan, Duchess of Norfolk
- Thomas Stanley, 1st Baron Stanley
- Thomas Stanley, 1st Earl of Derby

== Architecture ==
According to a survey of the ruins made in 1886, the church was cruciform in plan with a presbytery (chancel) 42 feet (13 m) by 24 feet (7.3 m), a central tower 22 feet 6 inches (6.86 m) square; north transept and south transepts, and nave 100 feet (30 m)by 24 feet 6 inches (7.47 m) with a north aisle. On the south side of the nave was a cloister 67 feet (20 m) square. The seal used on the surrender deed of the priory shows a view of the monastic buildings.

The parts still standing above ground consist of the two piers which originally supported the north side of the crossing tower of the church. They survive to some height above the springing of the crossing arches, although the voussoirs of the arches themselves have been removed. There are fragmentary walls projecting from the eastern pier to the north and east, while the other incorporates a small trefoil-headed recess or aumbry. These remains probably date from the late 13th century.

== See also ==
- Grade I listed buildings in Lancashire
- Scheduled monuments in Lancashire
- Listed buildings in Ormskirk
