= St Andrew's Church, Wanborough =

Coordinates: 51.5416°N 1.7019°W

St Andrew's, Wanborough
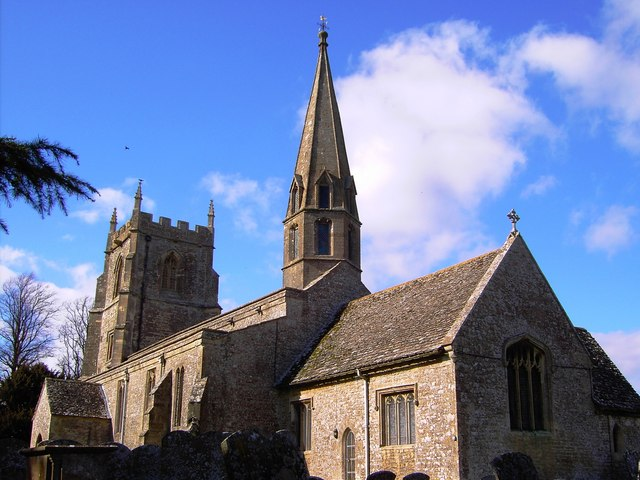

- Location in Wiltshire
- OS grid reference: SU 20772 82568
- Location: Wanborough, Wiltshire
- Country: England
- Denomination: Anglican

History
- Status: Parish church

Architecture
- Functional status: Active
- Heritage designation: Grade I listed building
- Designated: 26 January 1955

Administration
- Province: Canterbury
- Diocese: Bristol
- Deanery: Swindon

St Andrew's Church is in the village of Wanborough in north Wiltshire, England. It is an active Anglican parish church in the Diocese of Bristol, one of only three churches in England to have both a western tower and a central spire. It has been designated a Grade I listed building.

== History ==
There has been a church at Wanborough since at least the 11th century. In 1091 it was granted by Saint Osmund to the Chapter of Salisbury. By the end of the 14th century, the advowson of Wanborough belonged to Amesbury Priory. In 1541, following the Dissolution of the Monasteries, the rectory and advowson were granted to the Dean and Chapter of Winchester. In 1908 the rights of advowson were transferred to the Lord Chancellor.

In the 14th century, the nave was rebuilt, along with the tower and spire above the crossing. A tower was added to the west in the 15th century; its construction began in 1435. A chancel and porch to the north were also added in the 15th century. Restoration work took place in 1887. When whitewash and plaster were removed from the inside walls, wall-paintings dating from the 15th century were revealed.

== Architecture ==
=== Exterior ===
The church sits on an elevated piece of land at Upper Wanborough. It is constructed of chalk-stone rubble with stone tile roofs. Its plan consists of a four-bay nave with aisles, and porches to the north and south; a very short transept is apparent internally. The tower to the west has three stages and is crenellated. Above its west window, the tower has a canopied niche. Its windows have Somerset tracery. There is a smaller hexagonal tower with a spire to the east of the nave. St Andrew's is one of only three churches in England to have both a western tower and a central spire. (Note: The other churches with both a western tower and a central spire are St Mary's Church in Purton, Wiltshire and the Church of St Peter and St Paul in Ormskirk, Lancashire.) The chancel has two bays and a small door to the north. The porch to the south is gabled with flanking pinnacles with crocketed finials.

=== Interior and fittings ===
Inside the church there are pointed arcades and quatrefoil piers. The north wall of the nave still has one of the paintings discovered in the 19th century, situated to the left of the north door. It depicts Christ's Entry into Jerusalem. There are monuments to Thomas and Edith Polton who both died in 1418. The porch to the south contains 14th-century stone effigies.

The church houses a ring of eight bells hung for change ringing, and a separate service bell. The first and second (lightest) bells of the ring were cast in 1997 by John Taylor & Co of Loughborough; as were in 1949 the third, seventh and eighth; and in 1950 the fifth; the fourth was cast in 1730 by John Cor, and is regarded as a fine example of a bell from this era; the sixth was cast in 1662 by William Purdue III. The service bell was cast in 1783 by Robert Wells II.
