= William Edward Heaton =

Recipient of the Victoria Cross

William Edward Heaton VC
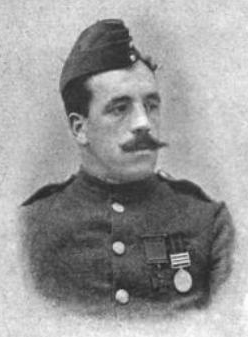
- Born: 2 January 1875; Ormskirk, Lancashire, England
- Died: 5 June 1941 (aged 66); Southport, Merseyside, England
- Burial place: Ormskirk Parish Churchyard
- Military career
- Allegiance: United Kingdom
- Branch: British Army
- Rank: Sergeant
- Units: The King's (Liverpool) Regiment
- Conflicts: Second Boer War; World War I
- Awards: Victoria Cross

William Edward Heaton VC (2 January 1875 – 5 June 1941) was an English recipient of the Victoria Cross, the highest and most prestigious award for gallantry in the face of the enemy that can be awarded to British and Commonwealth forces.

== Details ==
Heaton was 25 years old, and a private in the 1st Battalion, The King's (Liverpool) Regiment, British Army during the Second Boer War when the following deed took place at Geluk, South Africa for which he was awarded the VC:

On the 23rd August, 1900, the Company to which Private Heaton belonged, advancing in front of the general line held by the troops, became surrounded by the enemy and was suffering severely. At the request of the Officer Commanding, Private Heaton volunteered to take a message back to explain the position of the Company. He was successful, though at the imminent risk of his own life. Had it not been for Private Heaton's courage there can be little doubt that the remainder of the Company, which suffered very severely, would have had to surrender.

== Further information ==
He later achieved the rank of sergeant and served during World War I.

== The medal ==
His Victoria Cross is displayed at the Museum of the King's Regiment, Liverpool, England.
