= Ormskirk bus station =

Bus station in Ormskirk, England

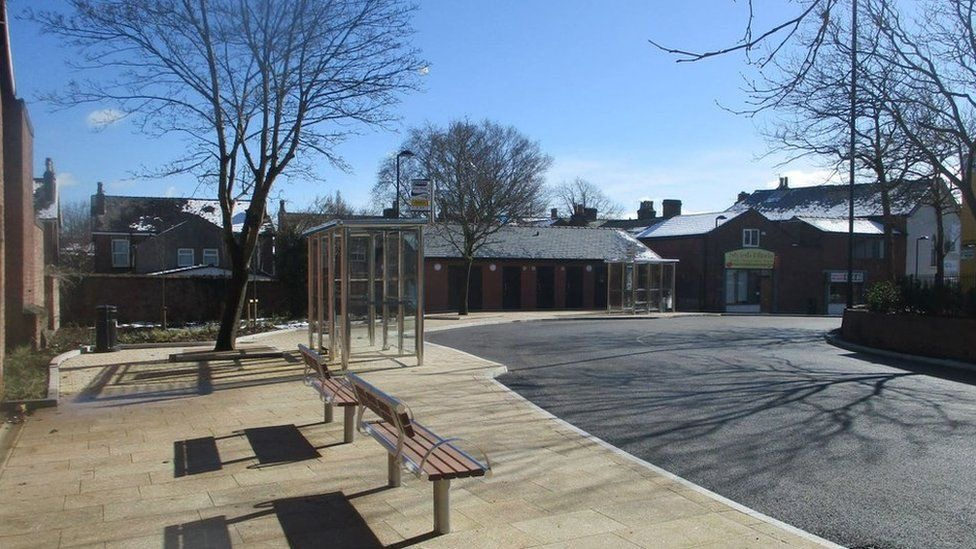
- The bus station in 2023

General information
- Location: Ormskirk; England
- Coordinates: 53.5671°N 2.8833°W
Location

Ormskirk bus station is a bus station in Ormskirk, England.

== Connections ==
The bus station is connected to Ormskirk railway station via a shared-use footpath and cycleway. Ormskirk bus station has connections to Southport, Liverpool, Wigan and Skelmersdale.

== History ==
In 2016, the council announced the Moor Street Gateway Project, which included the redevelopment of the bus station. There were proposals to build multistorey student accommodation above the rebuilt bus station, but these proposals were dropped in 2019. In July 2021, a planning application was submitted for the development of the bus station.

The rebuilt bus station opened on 13 March 2023.
