= Listed buildings in Ormskirk =

Ormskirk is a town in the West Lancashire district of Lancashire, England. The town, including the neighbouring village of Westhead and surrounding countryside, contains 68 buildings recorded in the National Heritage List for England as designated listed buildings. One is listed at Grade I, the highest of the three grades, three are at Grade II*, the middle grade, and the others are at Grade II, the lowest grade. The oldest listed buildings are a church and the remains of a priory. Many of the later listed buildings are houses and associated structures, and farmhouses and farm buildings. Other listed buildings include public houses, churches and associated structures, public buildings, buildings associated with the railway, a water tower, a drinking fountain, a water pumping house, a clock tower, a statue, war memorials, and a telephone kiosk.

== Key ==
Grade	Criteria
I	Buildings of exceptional interest, sometimes considered to be internationally important
II*	Particularly important buildings of more than special interest
II	Buildings of national importance and special interest

== Buildings ==
Name and location	Photograph	Date	Notes	Grade
Church of St Peter and St Paul; 53.56921°N 2.88764°W		12th century	Numerous alterations and additions were made during the following centuries, including the steeple towards the end of the 14th century, and the tower in the middle of the 16th century. In about 1739 the nave and aisles were rebuilt in Classical style, and in 1877–91 Paley and Austin undertook a considerable restoration in Gothic Revival style. The church is built in sandstone with stone-slate roofs. It consists of a nave with a west tower, a north aisle, a south aisle with a southwest steeple and the Scarisbrick chapel at the east end, and a chancel with a north vestry and the Derby chapel to the south. The tower is in three stages with a west doorway, and an embattled parapet with centre and corner pinnacles. The steeple has a tower with a square first stage, broaching to an octagonal stage that is surmounted by an octagonal spire.	II*
Burscough Priory; 53.58305°N 2.85629°W		c. 1190	The priory was founded by Augustinian canons, and is now a ruin. The ruins consist of two piers, the respond of the north arcade, and a stump of the chancel wall. The ruins are also a Scheduled Monument. (Note: Despite its name, the priory is not in the parish of Burscough but is in the unparished area of Ormskirk.)	I
Aughton Hall; 53.57486°N 2.90705°W		c. 1600	Originally a manor house, it was altered in 1670 and restored in the 20th century. Originally timber-framed, it is now in brick on a sandstone plinth. with composition tile roofs. The house has an L-shaped plan, with two four-bay wings at right angles. There are two storeys, and attics in the front range, which also has a plain doorway and a datestone. In the rear wing is a round-headed doorway. Inside the house is exposed timber-framing, and in the rear wing is a Tudor arched fireplace on each floor.	II
Chapel House; 53.56365°N 2.88327°W	—	Late 17th century	The house is roughcast on brick with a slate roof, and has three storeys and three bays. The doorway is round-headed, and the windows are irregularly-spaced sashes. At the rear of the house is a bow window.	II
Cornerstone; 53.56846°N 2.88581°W	—	Late 17th century	A building of unknown origin, altered in the early 19th century, and later converted into a restaurant. It is in sandstone with quoins and a stone-slate roof. The building has a cruciform plan with three north–south bays and two outshuts to the sides, and is in two storeys. Some of the windows are mullioned or mullioned and transomed. There is a doorway with a segmental head, and a first-floor doorway approached by steps.	II
Darbyshire's Farmhouse; 53.55726°N 2.84668°W	—	Late 17th century	The farmhouse was enlarged in the 18th century, and later the attached barn was converted for domestic use. The building is in brick on a sandstone plinth, and has a roof of composition tiles. There are two storeys and three bays, with a parallel range and an outshut at the rear. The doorway has a plain surround and a rectangular lintel, and the windows are casements. Inside the house is an inglenook and a bressumer.	II
Shippon and barn range, Cross Hall Farm; 53.56715°N 2.86330°W	—	1680s	The farm building was extended in the 18th century and subsequently altered. The original part is in sandstone with quoins, the extension is in brick, and the roof is of stone-slate. The building has four bays and two storeys. Openings include wagon entrances, shippon doorways (some with Tudor arched heads and large monolithic lintels}, ventilation slits (some blocked), and mullioned windows.	II
God's Providence Cottage; 53.56774°N 2.87218°W	—	1690	A sandstone cottage, partly rendered, with quoins and a slate roof. It has two storeys and a symmetrical two-bay front. The central doorway has an unusual surround of raised roll moulding, and above it is a datestone with a similar surround. The windows are casements, and those in the ground floor have massive lintels.	II
Lund's Farmhouse; 53.56173°N 2.84073°W	—	Late 17th or very early 18th century	The farmhouse was altered in the late 18th century. It is in brick with a stone-slate roof, and has two storeys and three bays with later additions to the rear. On the front is a doorway with a plain surround and a 20th-century glazed porch, and casement windows with raised sills and rectangular lintels.	II
Barn, White Rails Farm; 53.57287°N 2.89988°W		c. 1700	The barn is in brick, and has been altered. On the front are buttresses, a wagon entrance, windows, and blocked ventilation slits. The west gable wall has external steps leading to a first-floor loft window. (Note: Street View in March 2009 shows that the barn has been converted for domestic use.)	II
Windmill public house 53.56658°N 2.87984°W		c. 1700	Originally a house, later a public house, it is in brown brick with yellow brick dressings and a slate roof, and has three storeys. The doorway has a 20th-century wooden doorcase with fluted pilasters and a pediment. Some windows have been blocked, others are sashes. There is a two-storey rear extension with a stone-slate roof.	II
Buck i'th' Vine Inn; 53.56852°N 2.88534°W		Late 17th or early 18th century (probable)	The public house is in brick, partly on a stone plinth, with some sandstone dressings and a stone-slate roof. It has two storeys and a T-shaped plan, with a range facing the road and a wing at the left. Between the windows in the main range are buttresses, and in the angle between the main range and the wing is a porch. The windows are sashes. At the rear are extensions linking with a taller two-storey range.	II
White Rails Farmhouse and garden wall 53.57295°N 2.90021°W	—	Late 17th or early 18th century	A brick house on a stone plinth with a composition tile roof. It has two storeys and three bays, with a rear wing. On the front is a two-storey gabled porch with a square-headed doorway and a casement window above. The other windows on the front are horizontal sliding sashes. To the right is a garden wall, mainly in brick with some sandstone, and with rounded coping.	II
86 and 88 Chapel Street; 53.56418°N 2.88334°W	—	1703	Possibly originally a farmhouse, and later divided into two dwellings, the building is in roughcast brick with a slate roof. It has two storeys and extensions at the rear. The windows are sashes, those on the upper floor being horizontal sliding sashes. Also in the upper floor is a datestone. At the rear is a casement window with the remains of a former mullioned window.	II
27 Church Street; 53.56800°N 2.88693°W	—	Early 18th century	A shop with offices above in brick with a slate roof, it has three storeys and three bays. In the ground floor is a shop front with a wagon entry on the right. In the upper floors are sash windows, and at the rear are later extensions.	II
29, 29A, 31 and 31A Moor Street; 53.56715°N 2.88449°W	—	Early 18th century	A pair of shops with living accommodation above, in brick, partly rendered and with a slate roof. They are in a U-shaped plan with a wagon entry between the shops. There are two storeys with attics, and three bays, with shop fronts on the ground floor. No. 29 has two casement windows in the first floor and one in the attic, with raised sills and wedge lintels, and No. 31 has one altered window in each floor.	II
Bath Lodge; 53.57648°N 2.86910°W		Early to mid-18th century	Originally possibly a folly or a hunting lodge. The building is in brick with rendered dressings and a stone-slate roof, and is in Gothick style. It has a rectangular plan with symmetrical sides of three bays, and has embattled gable parapets. There is a doorway in the southwest front flanked by oculi, and all the sides are decorated with motifs that include bands, some of which are saw-tooth, blank arches, blind oculi, and tracery in differing styles. The lodge was converted for domestic use around 2010 and was featured on the Channel 4 series The Restoration Man.	II*
Sundial; 53.56908°N 2.88786°W	—	18th century	The sundial is in the churchyard of the Church of St Peter and St Paul. It is in sandstone and stands on a base two square steps. The sundial consists of a vase pedestal with four consoles to its foot, a globe in the centre, a fluted collar, and a carved cap.	II
43 Burscough Street; 53.56877°N 2.88509°W		Mid to late 18th century	Originally a house, later used as an office, it is in brick on a rendered plinth, with sandstone dressings and a hipped roof, and is in Georgian style. There is a rectangular plan, with a semicircular stair turret and extensions to the rear. The house has three storeys with cellars and attics, and a symmetrical front of five bays, the central three bays projecting slightly forward under a pediment. There is a first-floor band, a moulded cornice and a blocking course. The central round-headed doorway has an Ionic doorcase with engaged columns, a lintel above which is an inscribed plaque, a semicircular fanlight, and an open pediment. In the middle floor is an arcade of blind round-headed arches. Most of the windows are sashes.	II
Blythe Meadow; 53.58366°N 2.86872°W	—	Mid to late 18th century	Originally a farmhouse, the house is in brick with sandstone dressings and a stone-slate roof. There are two storeys and a symmetrical front of two bays. The central doorway has a pedimented architrave with flat pilasters and a pulvinated frieze. The windows have wedge lintels with pseudo-voussoirs. The glazing has been altered, and there are extensive additions at the rear.	II
Leas Farmhouse; 53.57465°N 2.85153°W	—	Mid to late 18th century (probable)	The farmhouse is in brick with sandstone dressings and a slate roof. It is in two storeys with a symmetrical three-bay front. In the centre is a two-storey porch with a round-headed doorway. The windows are casements with raised sills and wedge lintels. At the rear are sliding sash windows.	II
Mawdesleys Farmhouse with barn 53.56393°N 2.85121°W	—	Mid to late 18th century (probable)	The farmhouse and attached farm are in brick. The house has a slate roof, it is in two storeys, and has two bays with an extension to the rear. It has a central lean-to porch and casement windows with segmental heads; the windows in the rear extension are sliding sashes. The barn has a roof of stone-slate, is in two bays, and its former wagon entrance has been removed.	II
Deans Farmhouse; 53.56329°N 2.84443°W	—	1768	The house is in roughcast on brick, and has a stone-slate roof. There are two storeys with an attic, and a symmetrical front of two bays. The central doorway has a segmental head, and the windows, also with segmental heads, all contain 20th-century casements. In the middle of the upper floor is a datestone. There is a small attic window in the right gable wall.	II
Barn, Lund's Farm; 53.56157°N 2.84054°W	—	Late 18th century	A brick barn with a stone-slate roof in three bays. In the centre is a large wagon entrance with a semi-elliptical head, and in the walls are ventilation slits in diamond patterns. In the right return is a blocked doorway with a segmental head, and at the rear is a square-headed wagon doorway.	II
Town End House; 53.56399°N 2.89174°W	—	Late 18th century (probable)	The house is in brick with two storeys, and has a rectangular plan with an angled rear wing at the right end. The doorway has a pedimented surround. The doorways are top-hung casements imitating sashes. They all have raised sills, and the windows in the ground floor also have wedge lintels. At the rear is a stair window.	II
2 Church Street; 53.56760°N 2.88615°W	—	1779	Originally the Town Hall, later used as a shop with offices. It is roughcast on brick, and has a tile roof, in three storeys and with two bays. The building is at right angles to the road, and has a rectangular plan. In the ground floor is a shop front, and above are two windows in each floor with altered glazing. At the top is a pedimented gable containing a large painted coat of arms.	II
Wimbrick House; 53.56089°N 2.89606°W	—	1783	Originally a farmhouse, the house is in brick, and has a rectangular plan with a small service wing to the rear. There are two storeys with attics and cellars, and three bays. The doorway is round-headed, and has a pediment, an architrave with pilasters and rosettes in the entablature, and a fanlight. The windows are sashes. The rear wing has one storey with a porch in the angle. Inside the house is a stone spiral staircase running from the cellar to the upper floor.	II
12 Church Street; 53.56798°N 2.88655°W	—	Late 18th or early 19th century	A brick shop with sandstone dressings, a slate roof, and red ridge tiles. There are three storeys and three bays. In the ground floor is a shop front and a wagon entrance with a segmental head and stone jambs and a cobbled pathway. The windows in the upper storeys are sashes, those in the middle floor having wedge lintels. At the rear is an extension with loading doors.	II
50 Moor Street; 53.56673°N 2.88274°W	—	Late 18th or early 19th century (probable)	A brick house with sandstone dressings and a composition tile roof. There are two storeys and a symmetrical front of two bays, and the windows are sashes. Above the windows and the central doorway are wedge lintels.	II
52 and 54 Moor Street; 53.56673°N 2.88256°W	—	c. 1800	Originally a row of three cottages, later converted into two dwellings. They are in brick with sandstone dressings and a composition tile roof, and have two storeys. In the ground floor are three doorways with plain surrounds and three horizontal sliding sash windows, all with wedge lintels. The upper floor has a fixed window above each doorway and a horizontal sliding sash window above each ground floor window. All the windows have raised sills.	II
58 Moor Street; 53.56673°N 2.88228°W	—	c. 1800	Originally a handloom weaving workshop, and later used for other purposes, the building is in brick with a composition tile roof. There are two storeys and nine bays. In the ground floor are an altered window and doorway, and six windows with segmental heads. In the upper floor are nine horizontal sliding sash windows.	II
Former barn, Buck i'th' Vine public house 53.56866°N 2.88563°W		c. 1800	The former barn has been incorporated into the public house. It is in brick and has two storeys. There are opposing wagon entrances and a doorway with a loading door above.	II
26–50 Chapel Street; 53.56519°N 2.88364°W	—	Early 19th century	A row of 13 brick cottages, some rendered, some pebbledashed, with slate roofs. They have two storeys and each cottage has one bay. The row contains a through-lobby and a wagon entrance. Some doorways are round-headed, others have flat heads; some cottages have retained their sash windows, and others have been altered.	II
The Rookery; 53.56673°N 2.89486°W	—	Early 19th century (probable)	The house is pebbledashed on brick with cement dressings, a sandstone porch, and a hipped slate roof. There are two storeys and three bays, and the house has a plinth, rusticated quoins, and a parapet. The gabled porch has a Tudor arched doorway and a parapet with an upstand on the apex. The inner doorway has fluted pilasters and a frieze. The windows are three-light casements with quoined surrounds and hood moulds. On the right return is a two-storey canted bay window, and in the left return is a single-storey bow window.	II
Ormskirk Division Agricultural Club; 53.56961°N 2.88460°W		1830	Built as The Dispensary, it has since been used for other purposes. It has a sandstone front, with brick at the sides and rear, and a stone-slate roof with a skylight. The building is in Greek Revival style, and is set back from the road, with a forecourt containing a flight of steps. The building has one storey and three bays, the central bay being occupied by a portico with four Doric columns, corner pilasters, an entablature with a cornice, and a pediment. The doorway has a moulded architrave and a fanlight. Flanking the portico are sash windows.	II
33 Burscough Street; 53.56840°N 2.88537°W	—	Early to mid-19th century	A house, later used as a shop, in brick with a sandstone plinth and dressings, and with a concrete tile roof. It has three storeys and two bays, and a short extension at the rear. The ground floor has been remodelled, and in the upper floors there are sash windows, those in the middle floor with wedge lintels. At the rear are steps up to the top floor, and the windows have been altered.	II
91 and 93 Burscough Street; 53.57023°N 2.88395°W		Early to mid-19th century	Originally a house and attached chapel, later used for other purposes, they are in brick with sandstone dressings and composition tile roofs. The former house has three storeys and cellars and a symmetrical three-bay front. The central doorway is round-headed and has an open pediment, pilasters, an entablature including urns, and a fanlight. Most of the windows are sashes. The former chapel is in a single storey, with a central round-headed doorway that has an architrave with a keystone and a fanlight. It is flanked by sash windows with wedge lintels.	II
52 and 54 Chapel Street; 53.56491°N 2.88367°W	—	Early to mid-19th century	A pair of brick cottages with sandstone dressings and a slate roof, and with three storeys. No. 52 is painted and No. 54 is rendered. The doorways are in the outer corners, and to the left of No. 54 is a round-headed lobby entrance. Each cottage has one window on each floor. The windows of No. 52 have altered glazing, and those of No. 54 are sashes.	II
56–66 Chapel Street; 53.56474°N 2.88368°W	—	Early to mid-19th century	A row of six brick cottages with a slate roof, No. 66 being canted forwards. They have two storeys, and each cottage has one bay. There is a lobby entrance between Nos. 64 and 66. The windows are sashes with flat-arched heads, apart from those of No. 66, which has wedge lintels.	II
68–78 Chapel Street; 53.56450°N 2.88354°W	—	Early to mid-19th century	A row of six brick houses with sandstone dressings and a slate roof. They have two storeys and each house has one bay. The doorways are paired and have wedge lintels, and the windows are sashes.	II
Ormskirk railway station, (west side); 53.56935°N 2.88140°W	—	1846–48 (probable)	The station building was constructed for the Liverpool, Ormskirk and Preston Railway, and has since been used for other purposes. It is in sandstone with a slate roof, and has an irregular plan. On the platform face is a former entrance with a lintel that is carried by a cast iron column, other doorways, and mullioned and transomed cross windows.	II
Derby Street Railway bridge 53.56841°N 2.88214°W	—	1846–48 (probable)	The bridge was built for the Liverpool, Ormskirk and Preston Railway, and carries Derby Street over the railway. It is built in sandstone, with red brick in the soffits. The bridge consists of three segmental arches on rectangular piers with impost bands. There are stepped rusticated voussoirs, and a parapet with flat coping.	II
Moor Street Railway bridge and cutting 53.56692°N 2.88371°W	—	1846–48 (probable)	The bridge was built for the Liverpool, Ormskirk and Preston Railway, and carries Moor Street over the railway. The bridge and cutting walls are in sandstone. The walls are about 130 metres (430 ft) long, and are ramped up to meet the bridge, which has a single stilted segmental arch. The walls and bridge have a moulded band, and parapets with rounded coping.	II
21 Church Street; 53.56779°N 2.88673°W	—	19th century	A rebuild of an earlier house, it is in roughcast brick with a slate roof. There are three storeys and three bays. In the ground floor is a shop front. The middle floor contains three windows with quoins, two of which are sashes, and the other has been altered. The top floor has two windows, one a sash window and the other a casement.	II
36 Derby Street; 53.56840°N 2.88288°W		Mid-19th century	Originally a hotel, later used as a restaurant, it is in brick with sandstone dressings, and a slate roof. It stands on a corner site, and has three storeys and cellars, with four bays on Derby Street, five bays on Railway Road, and a canted bay on the corner. The doorway on Derby Street has a round head, an architrave of fluted Doric semi-columns with an entablature, and a fanlight. On the Railway Road front is a doorway with pilasters and a fanlight. Most of the windows are sashes, and others are blind.	II
The Elms with garden wall 53.56882°N 2.88394°W	—	Mid-19th century	A brick house with some sandstone dressings and a hipped roof. It has two storeys and an L-shaped plan, with a main range and a projecting wing to the left. In the main range is a round-headed doorway with a keystone, and a recessed porch with a moulded wooden doorcase. Above the doorway is a small round-headed window. To the right of the doorway is a three-light window, and to the left, in the wing, is a canted bay window. In the upper floor are top-hung casement windows imitating sashes, and the wing has a pedimented gable. The garden wall is in sandstone with rounded coping, and is about 1.5 metres (4 ft 11 in) high.	II
5A Derby Street; 53.56875°N 2.88380°W	—	c. 1850	An office in brick with sandstone dressings, rusticated quoins, and a hipped roof, in Italianate style. It has a single storey and a symmetrical three-bay front. The central doorway has banded columns, an entablature, and a cornice. It is flanked by round-headed windows that have architraves with keystones. There are two similar windows in the right return with a doorway between them.	II
St Anne's Church; 53.56269°N 2.89292°W		1851	A Roman Catholic church by Weightman and Hadfield, it is in sandstone with a slate roof, and is in Decorated style. The church consists of a nave with a clerestory, aisles, a chancel with chapels, and a tower at the liturgical west end. The tower has angle buttresses, a stair turret, a west doorway with a moulded surround, a niche with an ogival head containing a statue, an embattled parapet, and a pyramidal roof.	II
St James' Church; 53.55826°N 2.85243°W		1851	The church was designed by Sydney Smirke in Geometric style. It is in sandstone with slate roofs, and consists of a nave, a south aisle, a chancel with a south vestry, and a southwest steeple. The steeple has a three-stage tower, a south doorway, and a broach spire with two tiers of lucarnes.	II
Old Vicarage; 53.55818°N 2.85127°W	—	c. 1851	The former vicarage to St James' Church is in sandstone with a slate roof. There are two storeys with attics and four bays, the left bay is gabled, and on the right is a gabled wing. In the wing is a porch with a segmental-pointed arched doorway. The windows are mullioned or mullioned and transomed. In the right return is a single-storey rectangular bay window.	II
Water Tower on Tower Hill; 53.56953°N 2.87243°W		1853–54	The water tower is in sandstone with a slate roof. It has a square plan, and is in Romanesque style. There are two Romanesque arches on each side, a plain frieze with grotesques at the corners, corbels with machicolations, and a pyramidal roof.	II*
Drinking fountain 53.56841°N 2.88257°W	—	1858	The drinking fountain is built into the parapet of a railway bridge. It is in sandstone and contains a pink semicircular marble bowl. Behind the bowl is a dated panel and above this is an inscribed plaque and a pitched upstand.	II
Magistrates' Court; 53.56872°N 2.88345°W		1860	The building is in sandstone, and has a rectangular plan with later extensions at the rear. There are two storeys and a symmetrical front of six bays. The second and fifth bays project forward under a shallow pediment and contain doorway (one of which has been converted into a window). The doorcases have banded columns and pilasters, and each has an entablature with a cornice and a frieze. The windows are sashes, those in the ground floor with round heads, and those in the upper floor with moulded architraves.	II
Ormskirk railway station, (east side); 53.56926°N 2.88119°W		c. 1860–70	The building on the east side of the station includes the booking hall and offices. It is in brick with a slate roof, and is in Italianate style. The building has a rectangular plan and is in one storey and 15 bays. The central two bays of the entrance front project forward and have a gabled parapet. The front has an arcade of blank arches and contains doorways and sash windows. The platform front also has doorways and sash windows, and a canted bay window. There is a seven-bay canopy carried on 15 cast iron columns that carry brackets containing a circular ornament in the spandrels.	II
Railway Hotel; 53.56854°N 2.88267°W		Mid to late 19th century	A public house and attached shop in brick with a slate roof. There are two storeys, and each part has two bays. The shop, on the left, has a three-light shop window and a doorway, both with pilasters, and another door to the right. In the upper floor are a sash window and a window with altered glazing, both with raised sills and wedge lintels. The hotel has a symmetrical front, with a central pedimented doorway flanked by windows with altered glazing. In the upper floor are two sash windows, with a large signboard between them.	II
Water Pumping House; 53.57104°N 2.89559°W	—	1870	The water pumping house is in red brick with sandstone dressings and slate roofs, and is in Jacobean style. It has a T-shaped plan with a main range and a double-pile range on the east side. The main range has a basement and a single tall storey. The entrance front has corner pilasters with quoins, a moulded cornice, a large shaped gable, and a square-headed doorway that has an architrave with an arcaded entablature containing an inscribed shield. There are more shaped gables along the sides, and the windows have eight lights and are mullioned and transomed. The other range has one storey, a corbel table, a cornice, shaped gables, and large round-headed archways.	II
Lodge, Water Pumping House; 53.57133°N 2.89566°W	—	c. 1870	The lodge is in brick with sandstone dressings and a slate roof. It is in Elizabethan style, with 2 1/2 storeys, and has a T-shaped plan consisting of a main two-bay range, a cross wing to the right, and a single-bay extension to the left. In the angle is a single-story gabled porch with a round-headed doorway. To the left is a mullioned window with a half-dormer above. In the cross wing is a canted bay window.	II
Water fountain 53.56509°N 2.88237°W	—	Late 19th century	The fountain is in Victoria Park, and is in cast iron. It has a moulded base, and a stem of four engaged columns carrying a bowl with floral decoration. Four curved stems rise from the rim of the bowl to form a canopy surmounted by a decorated finial.	II
Clock Tower; 53.56731°N 2.88599°W		1876	The tower is in yellow sandstone with dressings of red sandstone, it is in Gothic style, and is about 3 metres (9.8 ft) square. It has a chamfered plinth, and a base containing an arched doorway on the north side and blank arches on the other sides. The eastern arch contains an inscribed plaque, and the southern arch the semicircular bowl of a former drinking fountain. On the base is a tall tower with lancets, and at the top are clock faces, an embattled parapet, an arcaded belfry, and a two-stage pinnacle.	II
Emmanuel Church; 53.56814°N 2.88182°W		1878	A Methodist church designed by Peter Balmer, it is in yellow sandstone with red sandstone dressings and a slate roof. The church is in gothic style, and consists of a nave, a tower, and a staircase wing. The entrance front is gabled, and contains an arched doorway, and a four-light window with Geometrical tracery. The staircase wing to the left also contains a doorway. The tower, to the right, has three stages, with lancet windows and corner pinnacles. Inside the church is a gallery on three sides.	II
Beaconsfield Monument; 53.56697°N 2.88395°W		1884	The statue of Benjamin Disraeli is in limestone and stands on a sandstone pedestal. The pedestal is square, about 3 metres (9.8 ft) high, with a moulded base and cornice, and there is an inscribed panel on the side. The figure of Disraeli is standing and holding a scroll.	II
St James' School with master's house 53.56247°N 2.84346°W		1889	The school and house are in sandstone with a slate roof, and are in Gothic style. They have a T-shaped plan, with the school to the left having a cross wing, and the house attached to the right. The school has one storey, with two-light windows and a Tudor arched doorway in the main range, and a three-light window in the gable wall of the wing. The house has two storeys, two gabled bays, and sash windows.	II
Lychgate, St James' Church; 53.55801°N 2.85248°W		1890s	The lychgate stands at the entrance to the churchyard. It has high sandstone walls with timber-framing carrying a wide hipped stone-slate roof. Inside is a shoulder-high coffin rest.	II
Boer War Memorial; 53.56493°N 2.88233°W		c. 1905	The memorial is in Victoria Park, and is in sandstone with bronze plaques. It commemorates the men who fought, as well as those who were lost, in the Boer War. The memorial has a square base with square corner piers about 1 metre (3 ft 3 in) high, and a square plinth surmounted by an obelisk. The base is carved with floral patterns in Art Nouveau style, and there are inscribed plaques on the base and on the plinth.	II
War Memorial; 53.56283°N 2.89330°W		c. 1920	The war memorial stands in front of St Anne's Church. It is in white stone and consists of an obelisk on two steps. There is an inscription on the front of the obelisk, and towards its top is a carving in sandstone of Christ on the cross and a fallen soldier. There are flanking walls ending in dedication stones inscribed with the names of the fallen.	II
Ormskirk Comrades War Memorial; 53.56740°N 2.88861°W		1921	The war memorial originally stood by the Comrades of the Great War Club on Southport Road, and was moved to Coronation Park in 2012. It is mainly in sandstone, with a bottom step in granite. The memorial consists of a three-stepped base, a square pedestal, and a tapering obelisk 1.6 metres (5 ft 3 in) high. Carved on the obelisk are a palm branch and a laurel wreath in relief, and on the pedestal are inscriptions relating to both World Wars.	II
Telephone kiosk 53.56852°N 2.88346°W	—	1935	A K6 type telephone kiosk, designed by Giles Gilbert Scott. Constructed in cast iron with a square plan and a dome, it has three unperforated crowns in the top panels.	II
Old Brewhouse; 53.56863°N 2.88545°W	—	Uncertain	Situated in the courtyard behind the Buck i' th' Vine Inn, the former brewhouse and attached bottling house are in brick with slate roofs. They have two storeys and there are two gables. The windows have segmental heads, and in the brewhouse are also a doorway and a loading door.	II

== Notes and references ==
=== Sources ===
- Pollard, Richard; Pevsner, Nikolaus (2006), Lancashire: Liverpool and the South-West, The Buildings of England, New Haven and London: Yale University Press, ISBN 0-300-10910-5
- Historic England, "Church of St Peter and St Paul, Burscough (1221160)", National Heritage List for England
- Historic England, "Remains of Burscough Priory (1196625)", National Heritage List for England
- Historic England, "Burscough Augustinian Priory (1021355)", National Heritage List for England
- Historic England, "Aughton Hall, Ormskirk (1290667)", National Heritage List for England
- Historic England, "Chapel House, Ormskirk (1197056)", National Heritage List for England
- Historic England, "Cornerstone, Ormskirk (1197068)", National Heritage List for England
- Historic England, "Darbyshire's Farmhouse, Ormskirk (1210310)", National Heritage List for England
- Historic England, "Shippon-barn range approximately 200 metres northeast of Cross Hall Farmhouse (not included), Ormskirk (1197059)", National Heritage List for England
- Historic England, "God's Providence Cottage, Ormskirk (1290517)", National Heritage List for England
- Historic England, "Lund's Farmhouse, Ormskirk (1210376)", National Heritage List for England
- Historic England, "Barn approximately 6 metres east of White Rails Farmhouse, Ormskirk (1297538)", National Heritage List for England
- Historic England, "The Windmill Public House, Ormskirk (1290498)", National Heritage List for England
- Historic England, "Buck i' th' Vine Inn, Ormskirk (1221077)", National Heritage List for England
- Historic England, "White Rails Farmhouse and garden wall, Ormskirk (1221066)", National Heritage List for England
- Historic England, "Nos. 86 and 88 Chapel Street, Ormskirk (1197055)", National Heritage List for England
- Historic England, "No. 27 Church Street, Ormskirk (1297312)", National Heritage List for England
- Historic England, "Nos. 29, 29A, 31 and 31A Moor Street, Ormskirk (1297316)", National Heritage List for England
- Historic England, "Bath Lodge, Ormskirk (1221197)", National Heritage List for England
- Clarke, George (17 March 2010), "George Clarke and his fight to restore Britain's architectual [sic] treasures", The Telegraph
- Historic England, "Sundial approximately 4 metres south of porch of Church of St Peter and St Paul, Ormskirk (1197058)", National Heritage List for England
- Historic England, "43 Burscough Street, Ormskirk (1297539)", National Heritage List for England
- Historic England, "Blythe Meadow, Ormskirk (1197063)", National Heritage List for England
- Historic England, "Leas Farmhouse, Ormskirk (1210230)", National Heritage List for England
- Historic England, "Mawdesleys Farmhouse with attached barn, Ormskirk (1290502)", National Heritage List for England
- Historic England, "Deans Farmhouse, Ormskirk (1197070)", National Heritage List for England
- Historic England, "Barn approximately 5 metres east of Lund's Farmhouse, Ormskirk (1297321)", National Heritage List for England
- Historic England, "Town End House, Ormskirk (1210296)", National Heritage List for England
- Historic England, "No. 2 Church Street, Ormskirk (1297311)", National Heritage List for England
- Historic England, "Wimbrick House, Ormskirk (1297318)", National Heritage List for England
- Historic England, "No. 12 Church Street, Ormskirk (1197057)", National Heritage List for England
- Historic England, "No. 50 Moor Street, Ormskirk (1290551)", National Heritage List for England
- Historic England, "Nos. 52 and 54 Moor Street, Ormskirk (1197064)", National Heritage List for England
- Historic England, "No. 58 Moor Street, Ormskirk (1210253)", National Heritage List for England
- Historic England, "Former barn at west end of courtyard to rear of No. 35 Burscough Street, Buck i' th' Vine Inn, Ormskirk (1196627)", National Heritage List for England
- Historic England, "Nos. 26–50 Chapel Street, Ormskirk (1290648)", National Heritage List for England
- Historic England, "The Rookery, Ormskirk (1290646)", National Heritage List for England
- Historic England, "Ormskirk Division Agricultural Club, with forecourt and steps, Ormskirk (1221084)", National Heritage List for England
- Historic England, "No. 33 Burscough Street, Ormskirk (1196626)", National Heritage List for England
- Historic England, "Nos. 91 and 93 Burscough Street, Ormskirk (1196628)", National Heritage List for England
- Historic England, "Nos. 52 and 54 Chapel Street, Ormskirk (1297540)", National Heritage List for England
- Historic England, "Nos. 56–66 Chapel Street, Ormskirk (1290650)", National Heritage List for England
- Historic England, "Nos. 68–78 Chapel Street, Ormskirk (1196629)", National Heritage List for England
- Historic England, "Ormskirk Railway Station, building on west side of track (1210302)", National Heritage List for England
- Historic England, "Railway Bridge, Ormskirk (1290580)", National Heritage List for England
- Historic England, "Railway Bridge with cutting walls to north and south, Ormskirk (1290562)", National Heritage List for England
- Historic England, "No. 21 Church Street, Ormskirk (1290632)", National Heritage List for England
- Historic England, "No. 36 Derby Street, Ormskirk (1210185)", National Heritage List for England
- Historic England, "The Elms, with associated front garden wall, Ormskirk (1297313)", National Heritage List for England
- Historic England, "No. 5A Derby Street, Ormskirk (1290625)", National Heritage List for England
- Historic England, "Roman Catholic Church of St Anne, Ormskirk (1197066)", National Heritage List for England
- Historic England, "Church of St James, Ormskirk (1210368)", National Heritage List for England
- Historic England, "The Old Vicarage, Ormskirk (1297320)", National Heritage List for England
- Historic England, "Water Tower on Tower Hill, Ormskirk (1197069)", National Heritage List for England
- Historic England, "Drinking fountain in south-west corner of wall of railway bridge, Ormskirk (1197061)", National Heritage List for England
- Historic England, "Magistrates Courts, Ormskirk (1197060)", National Heritage List for England
- Historic England, "Ormskirk Railway Station, booking office etc on east side of track (1210315)", National Heritage List for England
- Historic England, "Railway Hotel, Ormskirk (1297314)", National Heritage List for England
- Historic England, "Water Pumping House, Ormskirk (1297315)", National Heritage List for England
- Historic England, "Lodge to Water Pumping House, Ormskirk (1210226)", National Heritage List for England
- Historic England, "Water Fountain in St Helens Road Park, Ormskirk (1245756)", National Heritage List for England
- Historic England, "Clock Tower, Ormskirk (1221073)", National Heritage List for England
- Historic England, "Emmanuel Methodist United Reformed Church, Ormskirk (1210209)", National Heritage List for England
- Historic England, "Beaconsfield Monument, Ormskirk (1297317)", National Heritage List for England
- Historic England, "St James Church of England School with attached masters house, Ormskirk (1297319)", National Heritage List for England
- Historic England, "Lychgate to Church of St James, Ormskirk (1210371)", National Heritage List for England
- Historic England, "Boer War Memorial in Victoria Park, Ormskirk (1197067)", National Heritage List for England
- Historic England, "War memorial, Ormskirk (1391772)", National Heritage List for England
- Historic England, "Ormskirk Comrades War memorial, Ormskirk (1445419)", National Heritage List for England
- Historic England, "K6 Telephone Kiosk opposite Magistrates Courts, Ormskirk (1290628)", National Heritage List for England
- Historic England, "The Old Brewhouse on north side of courtyard to rear of No.35 Burscough Street, Buck i' th' Vine, Ormskirk (1221080)", National Heritage List for England
- Historic England, Listed Buildings
