= Wanborough, Wiltshire =

Village in Wiltshire, England

Coordinates: 51.544°N 1.700°W

Wanborough
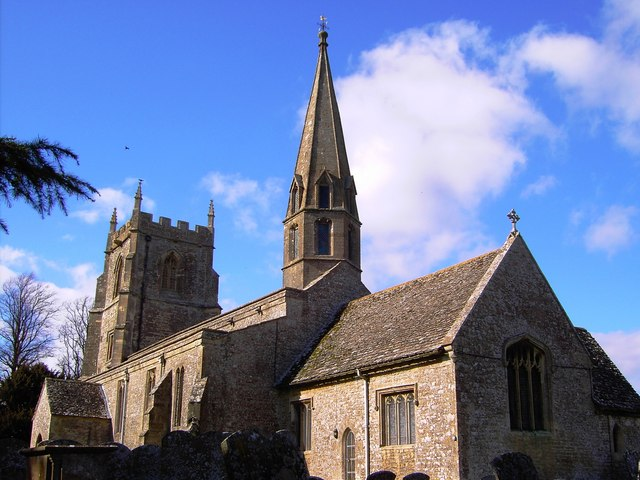
- St Andrew's parish church

- Location within Wiltshire
- Population: 1,951 (in 2021)
- OS grid reference: SU2082
- Civil parish: Wanborough
- Unitary authority: Swindon
- Ceremonial county: Wiltshire
- Region: South West
- Country: England
- Sovereign state: United Kingdom
- Post town: Swindon
- Postcode district: SN4
- Dialling code: 01793
- Police: Wiltshire
- Fire: Dorset and Wiltshire
- Ambulance: South Western
- UK Parliament: East Wiltshire
- Website: Parish Council

Wanborough is a large village and civil parish in the Borough of Swindon, Wiltshire, England. Situated about 4 miles (6.4 km) east-southeast of Swindon town centre, it contains two settlements: Lower Wanborough along the High Street, and Upper Wanborough on higher ground to the southwest.

The north of the parish includes a significant part of the New Eastern Villages development area, a planned large suburban expansion of east Swindon. The hamlets of Horpit (a short distance north of Wanborough) and Foxhill, 1.5 miles (2.4 km) to the southeast, also lie within the parish.

== History ==
There was a Roman settlement, Durocornovium, slightly northwest of the current village, at a road junction mentioned in the Antonine Itinerary. Being the last vicus on Ermin Way before the scarp slope of the Marlborough Downs, Durocornovium was a site where horses were watered before the steep climb off the Oxfordshire plain. Wanborough is just off the Ridgeway National Trail. Development in a strip along the road frontages characterised the village, which reached maximum development in the 4th century.

Wanborough has been suggested as the site of the fortress of Guinnion, the eighth of the twelve battles of Arthur listed by Nennius in Historia Brittonum

In three charters of the ninth century Wanborough is recorded as Wenbeorg. In the Domesday Book it is Wemberge, the 'm' being an evident mistake for 'n'.

The Anglo-Saxon Chronicle records that a battle was fought in 592 AD between Ceawlin, King of Wessex and the Britons, at a place called Woddesbeorge or Wodnesbeorge, ("Woden's borough"). This has given rise to considerable speculation as to whether the battle took place at Wanborough in Wessex, or in Staffordshire at Wednesbury (Wodnesbeorge, or "Woden's borough").

The antiquarian and historian W. H. Duignan stated in 1902: "Now it is impossible it can be Wanborough [...] 'Wen' [in Wenbeorg], in the ninth century, could not represent an original Woden. There is only one Wednesbury in England[...]and I suggest that the Woddesbeorge of three versions of the Chronicle is an error for Wodnesbeorge." Modern place-name scholarship tends to agree that the battle took place at Wednesbury. The alternative view is that the battle took place at Adam's Grave near Alton Barnes.

== Parish church ==
The Church of England parish church of Saint Andrew is unusual in having a spire at one end and a tower at the other. There are only three parish churches with this feature in the UK; the others are at nearby Purton and at Ormskirk, Lancashire.

== Amenities ==
The village has a primary school.

There is a monthly farmers' market in the village hall on the third Saturday of every month, except August where is replaced by the Wanborough Show.

== King Edward's Place ==
Towards the south of the parish is King Edward's Place, a country house once used as a private retreat for King Edward VII and his mistress Lillie Langtry. It was also the home of James "Jimmy" White (1877–1927), a financier, property developer, racehorse owner and speculator. After further use as a racehorse stud, conference centre and hotel, since 2010 the site has been operated by PGL Travel as a holiday camp for children, under the name PGL Liddington.
