= Ormskirk =

Market town in North West, England

Coordinates: 53.5665°N 2.8869°W

- Town
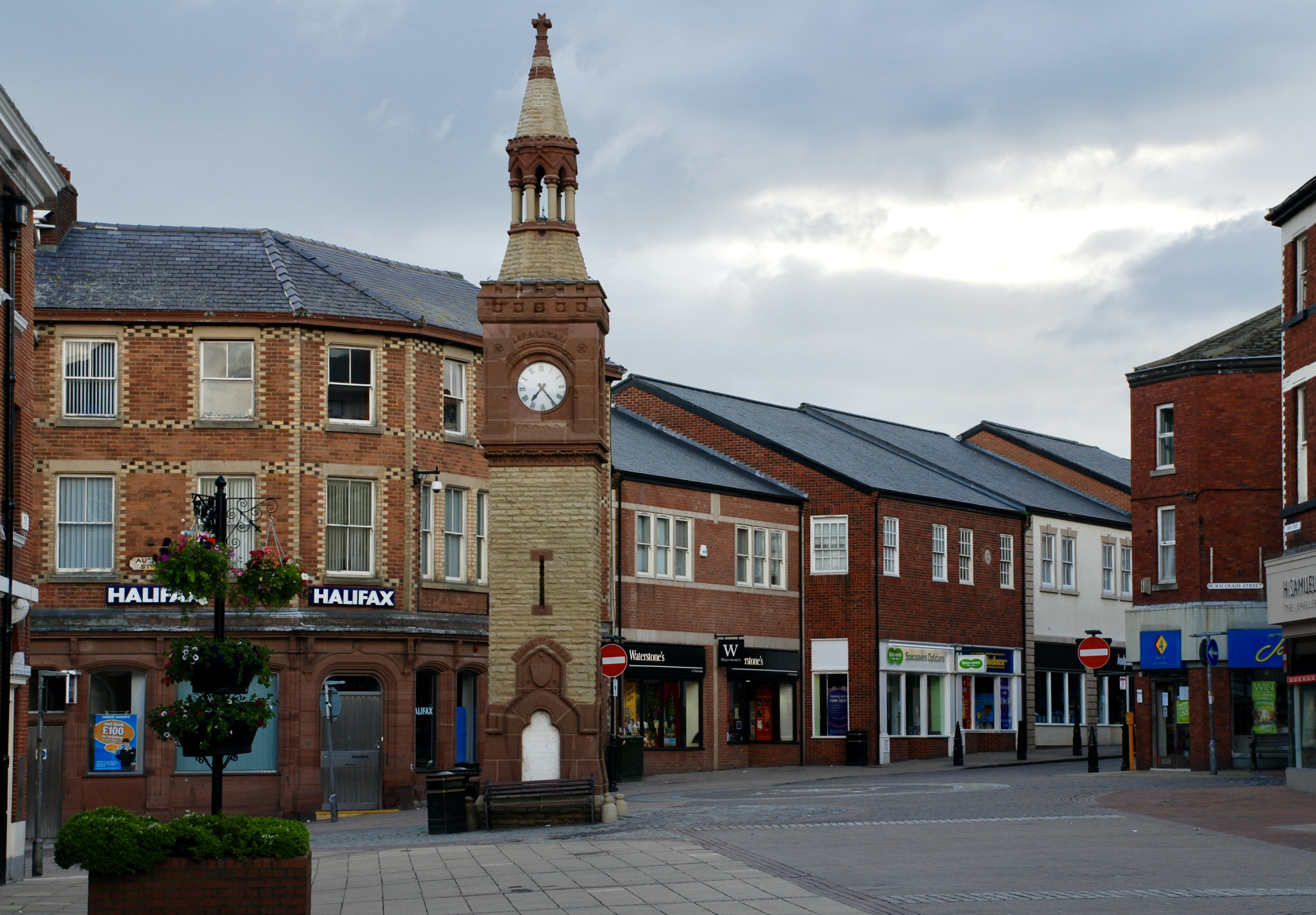
- Ormskirk town centre

- Shown within West Lancashire Location within Lancashire
- Population: 27,715 (2021 Census)
- OS grid reference: SD415085
- District: West Lancashire
- Shire county: Lancashire
- Region: North West
- Country: England
- Sovereign state: United Kingdom
- Post town: ORMSKIRK
- Postcode district: L39
- Dialling code: 01695
- Police: Lancashire
- Fire: Lancashire
- Ambulance: North West
- UK Parliament: West Lancashire

Ormskirk is a market town in the West Lancashire district of Lancashire, England. It is located approximately 13 miles (21 km) northeast of Liverpool and forms part of the wider Liverpool urban and commuting area. Ormskirk is known for its historic market, which dates from 1286, and for Ormskirk gingerbread. The town is served by Ormskirk railway station, with regular Merseyrail services to Liverpool Central and Northern Trains services to Preston. Ormskirk is also home to Edge Hill University.

== Geography ==
Ormskirk is approximately 13 miles (21 km) northeast of Liverpool and is situated in the West Lancashire district of Lancashire. The town is surrounded by a number of nearby towns and villages, with Burscough to the north, Skelmersdale to the east and Southport to the northwest. Aughton, Lathom and Scarisbrick are among the villages immediately surrounding Ormskirk, while Maghull and Formby lie to the southwest towards Liverpool.

Although administratively part of Lancashire, Ormskirk has strong links with Merseyside and the wider Liverpool City Region, particularly through employment, education, retail and transport. The town forms part of the wider economic area influenced by Liverpool and its surrounding towns, with commuting links between West Lancashire and Liverpool and neighbouring Sefton being significant. Ormskirk is also closely connected with the other principal settlements of West Lancashire, particularly Burscough and Skelmersdale, and serves as an important centre for the surrounding communities.

== Administration ==
Ormskirk is within the West Lancashire district of Lancashire, and is currently administered by West Lancashire Borough Council and Lancashire County Council. The town is the administrative centre of the West Lancashire district.

Local government reorganisation has been proposed for Lancashire, with the Government announcing in July 2026 a preferred model consisting of four new unitary authorities, including a proposed South Lancashire authority comprising Chorley, South Ribble and West Lancashire. However, in September 2026 the Government paused the reorganisation process and announced a review of the plans. The proposed unitary authorities and their boundaries therefore remain subject to further Government decisions and have not yet been implemented. West Lancashire Borough Council and the other existing councils are continuing to operate under the current arrangements.

The future administrative position of West Lancashire has also prompted discussion about its relationship with Merseyside and the wider Liverpool City Region. Although West Lancashire is part of Lancashire for local government purposes and is outside the Liverpool City Region Combined Authority, Ormskirk has strong geographical, transport, economic and social links with Liverpool and neighbouring Sefton. In particular, Ormskirk's proximity to Sefton and its direct Merseyrail connection to Liverpool Central have contributed to debate about whether West Lancashire's future administrative arrangements should reflect its links with Merseyside. Some local voices have argued for closer integration with Sefton and the Liverpool City Region, while others support retaining West Lancashire within Lancashire and the proposed South Lancashire arrangements. No final decision on the future structure has been made as of September 2026.

== History ==
The name Ormskirk is Scandinavian in origin and is derived from Old Norse Ormres kirkja: Ormr (which means snake in Old Norse), a personal name, and kirkja, church. Ormr may have been a Viking who settled here, became a Christian and founded the church but there are no other records or archaeological evidence to support this and Ormr's identity is unknown.

There is no reference to Ormskirk in the Domesday Book of 1086, but it has been suggested that it may have been part of Lathom at that time. In about 1189, the lord of Lathom granted the church of Ormskirk to Burscough Priory, which does suggest that Ormskirk had been subordinate to Lathom before that date.

An open market is held twice weekly, on Thursdays and Saturdays, in the pedestrianised centre of Ormskirk. The location was originally the junction of the main roads to Preston, Liverpool and Wigan, and was marked by a market cross going back to medieval times. During the 18th and 19th centuries the Cross, as the junction was known, was the location of a large lamp mounted on an obelisk with a circular drinking fountain for both people and animals around the base. This was moved to the junction of St Helens Road and Moor Street to make room for the erection of the clock tower in 1876.

The fountain was then moved again to opposite the Drill Hall down Southport Road in the 1890s when space was needed to site the Disraeli statue. The market was established by a royal charter that was granted by Edward I in 1286 to the monks of Burscough Priory. Thursday has been market day in Ormskirk since at least 1292. The King also granted a borough charter to Ormskirk at about the same time, but this seems to have become extinct by the end of the 15th century.

The Ormskirk Poor Law Union was established in 1837, covering 21 parishes and townships from Tarleton to Simonswood, and from Birkdale to Skelmersdale. Ormskirk Union Workhouse was built in 1853 on Wigan Road and later became Ormskirk District General Hospital.

With its weekly markets, the town became a focal point for local farmers and their agricultural workers, cottagers, cow-keepers etc. to trade their goods and obtain necessities from the markets and from the retail establishments which were established along with public houses and inns. An engineering industry, based on making and mending agricultural machinery also developed.

=== Ormskirk gingerbread ===
The town became known for its gingerbread over the years when local women would bake the gingerbread in their own homes and then take it to the staging inns to sell to passengers. When the railway arrived in the mid 19th century, the local gingerbread sellers found a new market. They were allowed to sell their product to passengers travelling through the railway station. One particular customer Edward, Prince of Wales, later Edward VII, enjoyed the local gingerbread so much he sent orders to the town. The baking of gingerbread became part of the retail history of the town, with several local bakers claiming to have the original gingerbread recipe. A well known local woman, Sally Woods, was a recognisable figure on the market selling her gingerbread.

=== Parish Church of St Peter and St Paul ===
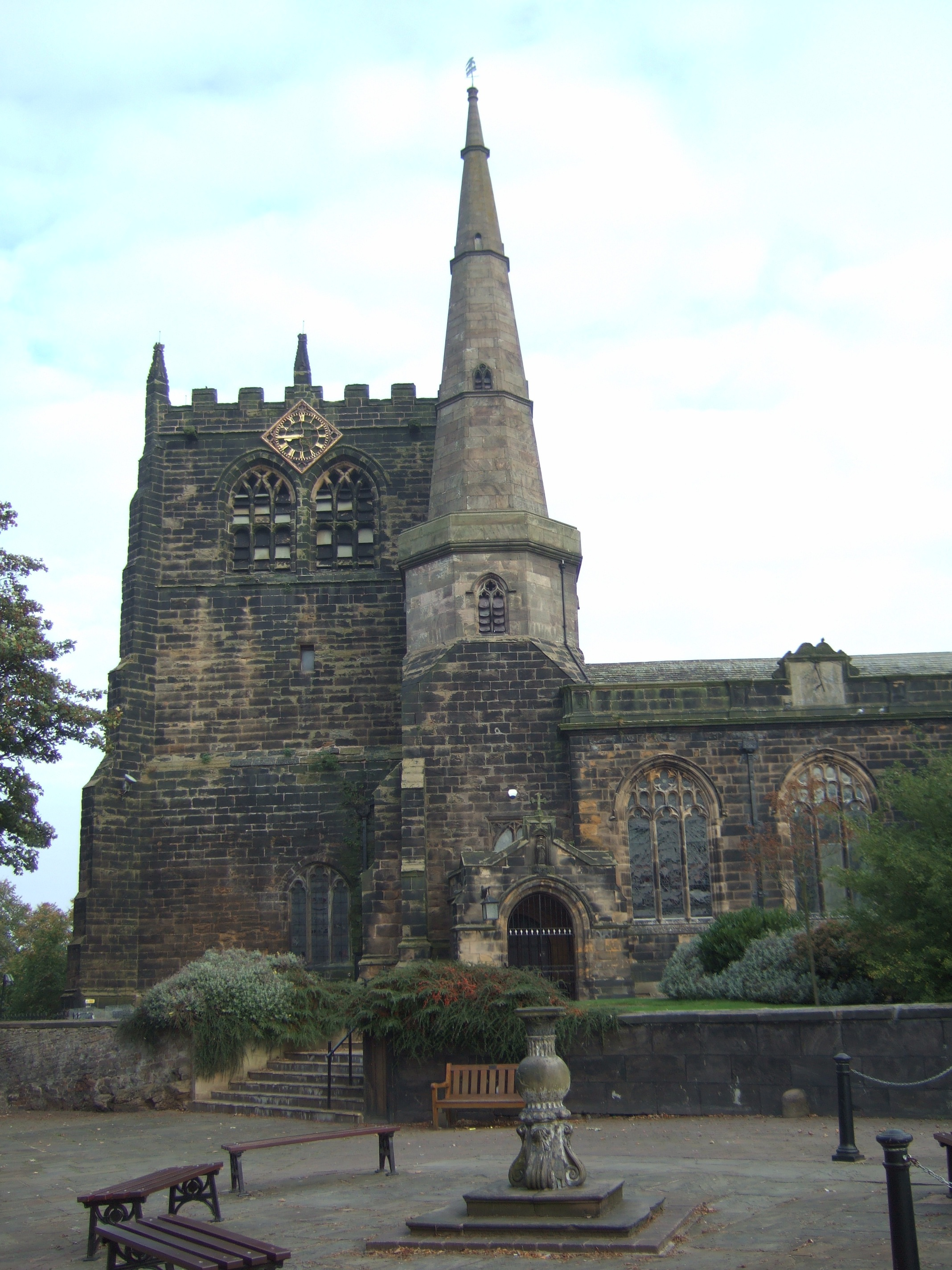
The distinctive tower and spire of Ormskirk Parish Church

The Parish Church of St Peter and St Paul is believed to be on the site of the original kirk, on a sandstone outcrop, and is the oldest building in the town. Its exact age is unknown; the building does contain some fragments of Norman architecture.

The parish church has many connections with the Earls of Derby and the Stanley family. Many family members are buried in the church's Derby Chapel, including Thomas Stanley, the first Earl, who caused Richard III to lose his crown by changing sides at the Battle of Bosworth in 1485, and the Royalist James Stanley, the seventh Earl, who was beheaded at Bolton in 1651 after the Civil War. His body is buried in one coffin and his head in a separate casket.

This is one of only three parish churches in England to have a tower and a separate spire, and is unique in that it has both at the same end of the building. (The other two are St Mary's Church, Purton and St Andrew's Church, Wanborough, both near Swindon, in Wiltshire). Legend has it that Orme had two sisters, one who wanted a tower, and one who wanted a spire, and to please them he built both.

The 'steeple' in fact dates from the early 15th century, but the original blew down in 1731 and was rebuilt between 1790 and 1832. The large west tower was added to the church around 1548 to house the bells of nearby Burscough Priory following the dissolution of the monasteries. One of these bells can still be seen in the church.

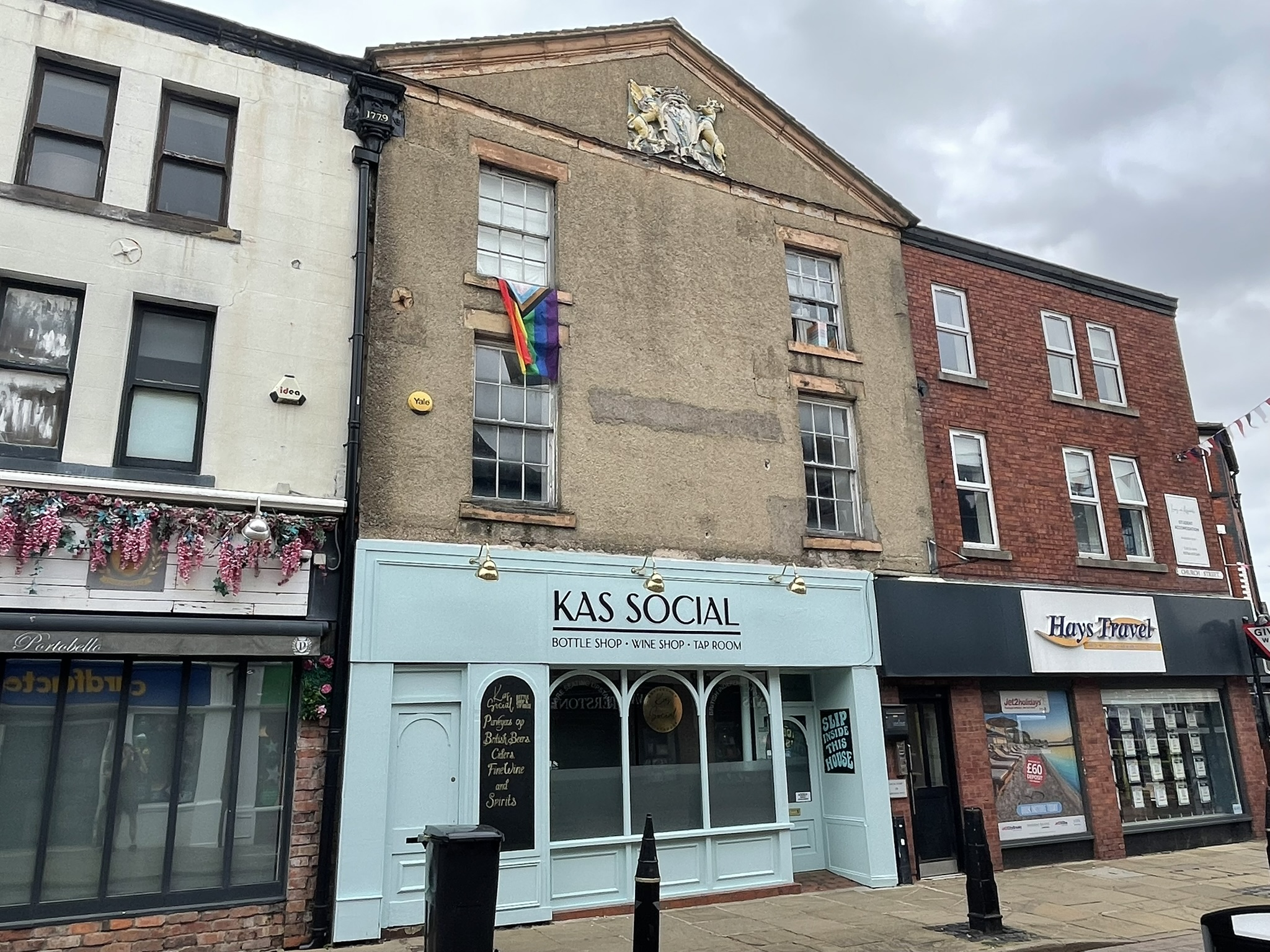
The Old Town Hall

The Old Town Hall was completed in 1779.

== Transport ==
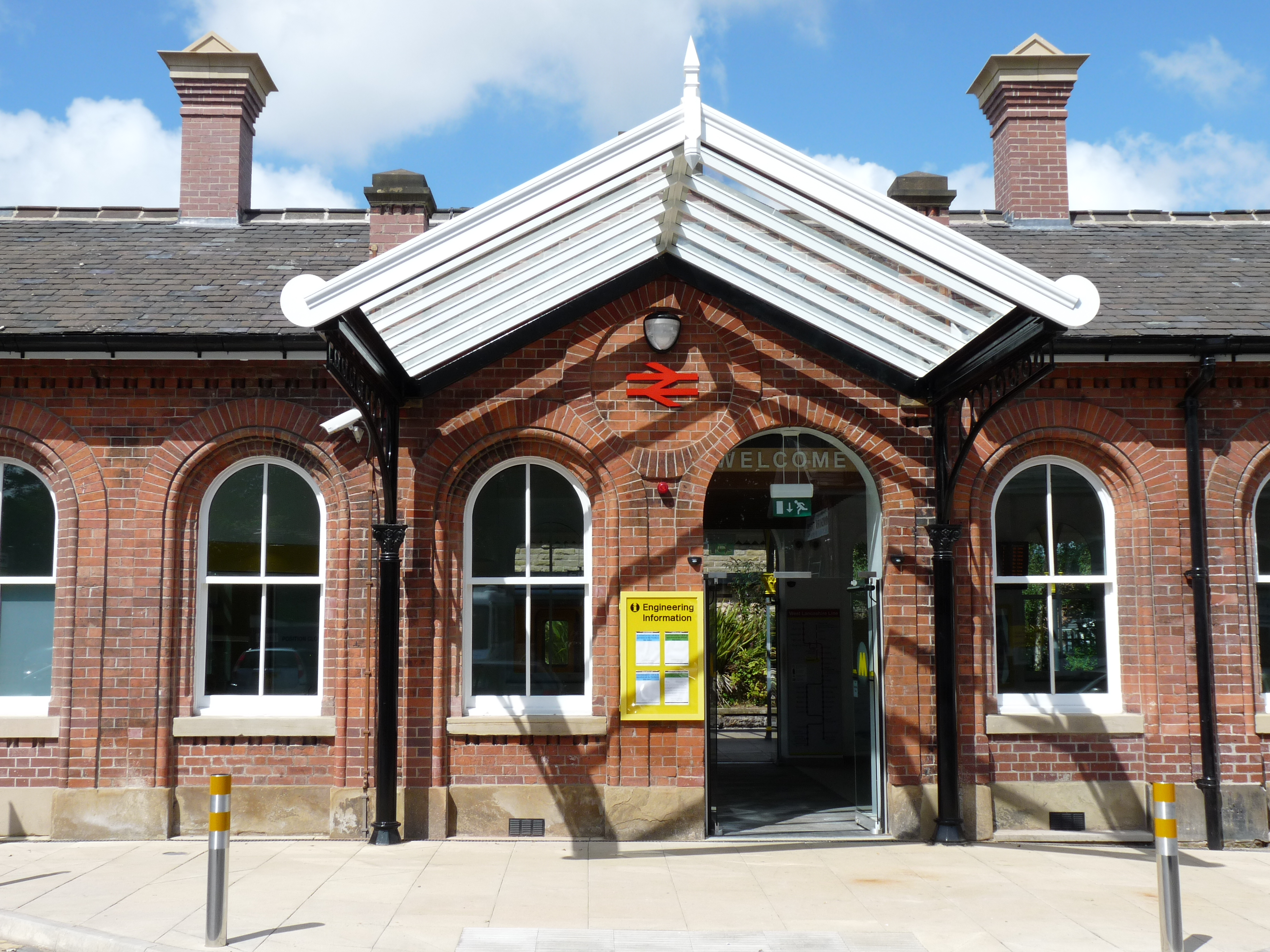
Ormskirk railway station.

The A59 is the main road, with Preston to the north and Liverpool to the south. The A570, from Southport, crosses the town from west to east and provides a link to the national motorway network at junction 3 of the M58, about three miles (five kilometres) from the town centre. It then continues to St Helens before reaching the M62 at Junction 7, Rainhill Stoops. The town has its own bus station, Ormskirk bus station.

The town's railway station, which was refurbished at a cost of £1 million in 2009, is a northern terminus of Merseyrail, and the line continues, with a change from electric to diesel multiple units, through to Preston, after the direct service was partitioned in 1970. This line was promoted by the Liverpool, Ormskirk and Preston Railway in August 1846, but was completed by the East Lancashire Railway. The route and Ormskirk station opened on 2 April 1849, the undertaking being merged into the Lancashire and Yorkshire Railway on 13 May 1859.

The Lancashire and Yorkshire Railway built the Skelmersdale Branch line to Skelmersdale and Rainford Junction, which opened on 1 March 1858. Passenger services ended on 5 November 1956, goods to Rainford Junction finished on 16 November 1961 and to Skelmersdale on 4 November 1963.

Buses are run by Stagecoach Cumbria and North Lancashire, Vision Bus, Huyton travel and Arriva Merseyside.

== Local economy ==
There is a Morrisons on Park Road, which was converted from a Safeway in 2005. The site was formerly home to the local gasworks, and the local Rover/Morris car dealership (Balmforths). The Two Saints is a modest retail park which opened in 2000 and contains a number of retailers including McDonald's, Argos, Mobility Store, Sports Direct, Aldi and a gym. In December 2013, when Blockbuster entered administration, its store at Two Saints closed. A Tesco Metro was located on Church Street, but it closed in April 2015.

An out of town business park, The Hattersley Centre, opened in February 2008, with a Home Bargains, Howdens, Tile Giant, Magnet, Jewson, Halfords (which closed in 2020) and a Plumbase. After Focus DIY went into administration, its store on the Hattersley Centre closed. An application for Asda to open in the unit was rejected in February 2011, after the application was submitted in August 2009. The centre was never fully occupied, and had been struggling since its completion. Netto closed down in August 2016, after the firm pulled out of the United Kingdom. The store had opened in November 2014. 2019 saw the Hattersley Centre expand with new units being built on adjacent unused land and occupied by Lidl and Toolstation. The expansion followed funding of £6.2M being secured from the Royal Bank of Scotland to clear the adjacent land and build new units.

One of the last significant manufacturing businesses remaining in Ormskirk were Atkinson & Kirby, who make hardwood floors and employed 80 people. They relocated in September 2015 after operating from Ormskirk for over 100 years. Businesses in the town are mainly professional and financial services, such as solicitors, estate agents, and accountants.

== Education ==
Ormskirk School (ages 11–18) is on Wigan Road in the east of the town, situated on a site formerly home to the demolished Cross Hall High School. The school is now part of the Endeavour Learning Trust. Ormskirk School is the result of a merger between Ormskirk Grammar School and Cross Hall High School. St Bede's Catholic High School (ages 11–16) is on St Anne's Road next to the A59 and Prescot Road, and opposite St Anne's Church. Edge Hill University is on the A570 St Helens Road heading east. West Lancashire College, a further education college, used to have a site in the town centre on Hants Lane but its students now have to travel to Skelmersdale. Ormskirk is also home to a public library.

== Media ==
The Ormskirk Advertiser, a Reach plc title, is the local newspaper; it shares a website with the Liverpool Echo. The town was formerly also served by the Champion, which closed in 2022. Sandgrounder Radio and Radio Heartbeat broadcast to patients at the Ormskirk District General Hospital.

== Parks and open spaces ==
The town has three main parks and a number of other smaller play areas and open spaces. The main parks are:-

- Victoria Park, named after Queen Victoria, is Ormskirk's oldest park, established towards the end of the 19th century. It contains a monument to local heroes of the Boer War and Crimean War. It is located on the triangle of land between Knowsley Road, St Helens Road and Ruff Lane.
- Coronation Park, a large park in the town centre on Park Road, which has children's play areas, skateboard area, games area for football and basketball, fitness equipment, duck pond, bowling green, bandstand and wildlife meadow. The Park was established in about 1905 by the former Ormskirk Urban District to commemorate the coronation of King Edward VII. In 2012 the Ormskirk War Memorial was relocated here from its original site in front of the former Comrades' Club on Southport Road.
- Ruff Wood, a countryside park on the edge of the town, on Ruff Lane.

== Notable people ==
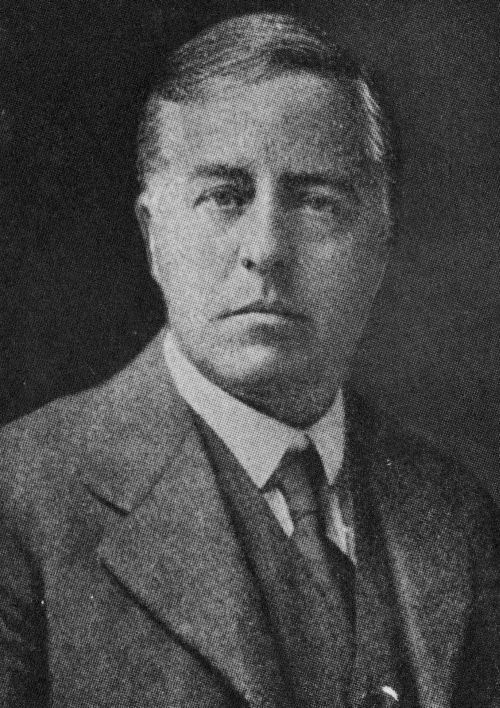
Sir James Jeans, ca.1930

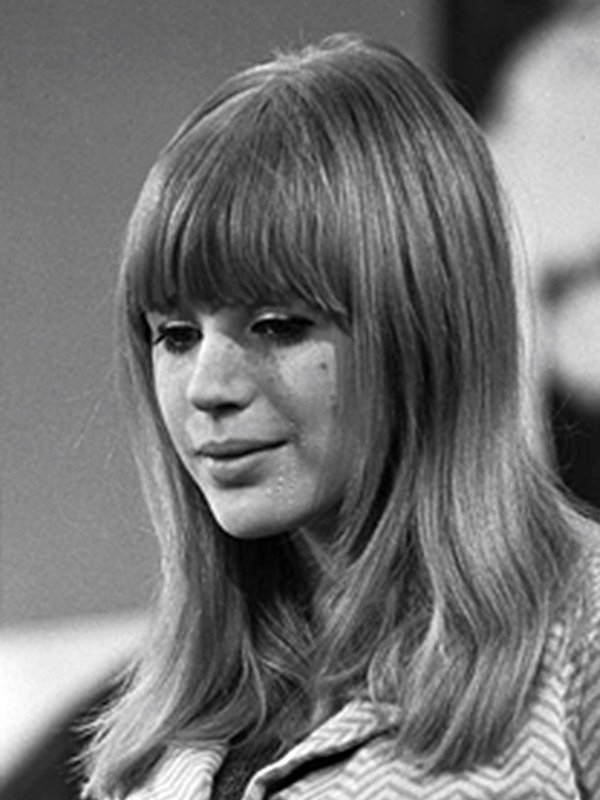
Marianne Faithfull, 1966

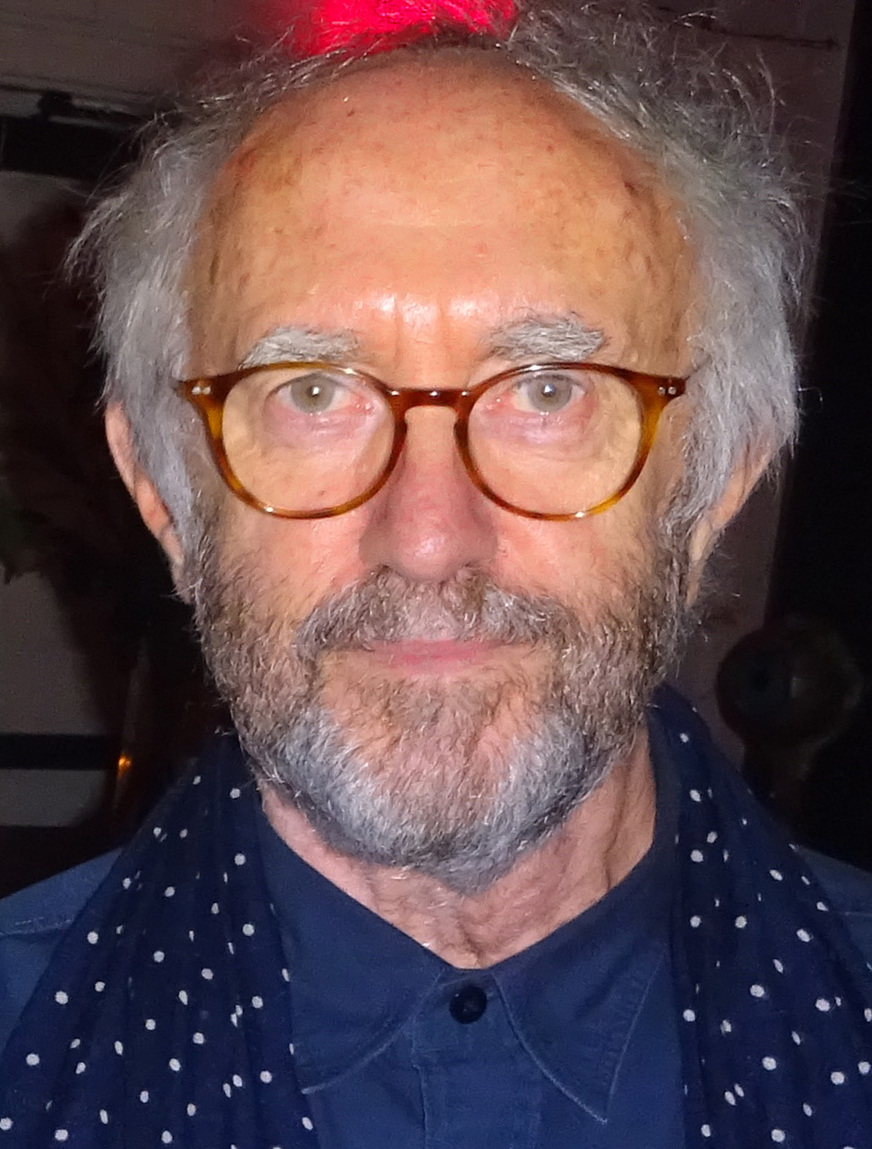
Sir Jonathan Pryce, 2016

See Category:People from Ormskirk

- John Souch (1593/4–1645), an English portrait painter.
- Charles Goore (1701–1783), an English merchant, and politician, who was twice Mayor of Liverpool.
- Joseph Brandreth (1745–1815), physician to Prince William Henry, Duke of Gloucester and Edinburgh
- William Thomas Lewis (ca.1748–1811), an English actor, known as "Gentleman" Lewis.
- William Moorcroft (1767–1825), veterinary surgeon, horse breeding expert and explorer.
- Alexander Goss (1814—1872), the second Archbishop of Liverpool.
- Robert Harkness (1816–1878), a British geologist and mineralogist.
- William Edward Heaton (1875–1941), recipient of the Victoria Cross, from The King's (Liverpool) Regiment
- Sir James Jeans (1877–1946), physicist, astronomer and mathematician, president of the Royal Astronomical Society, 1925 to 1927
- Euphemia Lamb (1887–1957), an artists' model; she modelled for Augustus John and Jacob Epstein
- Lady Helen Whitaker (1890–1929), commissioner for Hampshire Girl Guides, 1917 to 1924; from Lathom House
- Alexander Critchley (1893–1974), M.P. for Liverpool Edge Hill 1935–1945.
- Tom Middlehurst (born 1936), former Welsh Member of the Senedd (AM) and Education Minister.
- Marianne Faithfull (1946–2025), singer and actress; sang As Tears Go By.
- Sir Jonathan Pryce (born 1947), a Welsh actor. Studied at Edge Hill College.
- Les Pattinson (born 1958), bassist and co-writer, former member of Echo & the Bunnymen
- Richard Drummie (born 1959), guitarist and songwriter; co-founding member of musical group Go West.
- Stuart Maconie (born 1961), radio DJ and TV presenter, writer, journalist, and music critic. Studied at Edge Hill College.
- Andrew Mitchell (born 1967), Civil Servant and British ambassador to Germany since 4 September 2024.
- Jon Culshaw (born 1968), an English actor, comedian and impressionist, worked on Dead Ringers
- Nisha Katona (born 1971), a British restaurateur and TV personality. Born in Ormskirk, raised in Skelmersdale.
- Nicole Webster (born 1973), Australian marine scientist
- Helen Hayes (born 1974), MP for Dulwich and West Norwood since 2015
- Jack Renshaw (born 1995), far-right activist and convicted terrorist. Born in Ormskirk, raised in Skelmersdale.

=== Sport ===
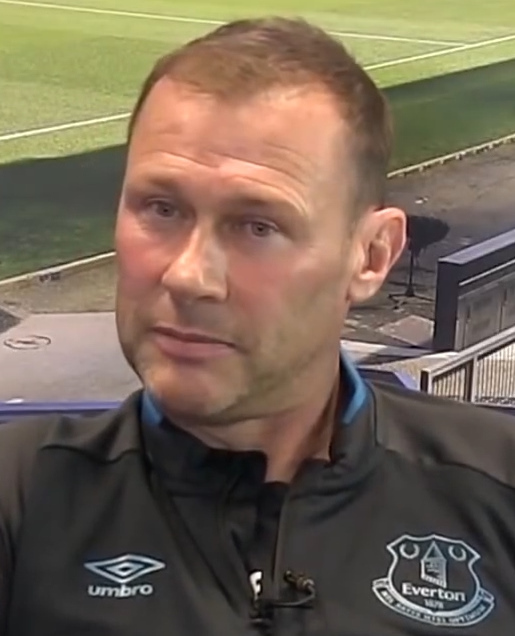
Duncan Ferguson, 2019

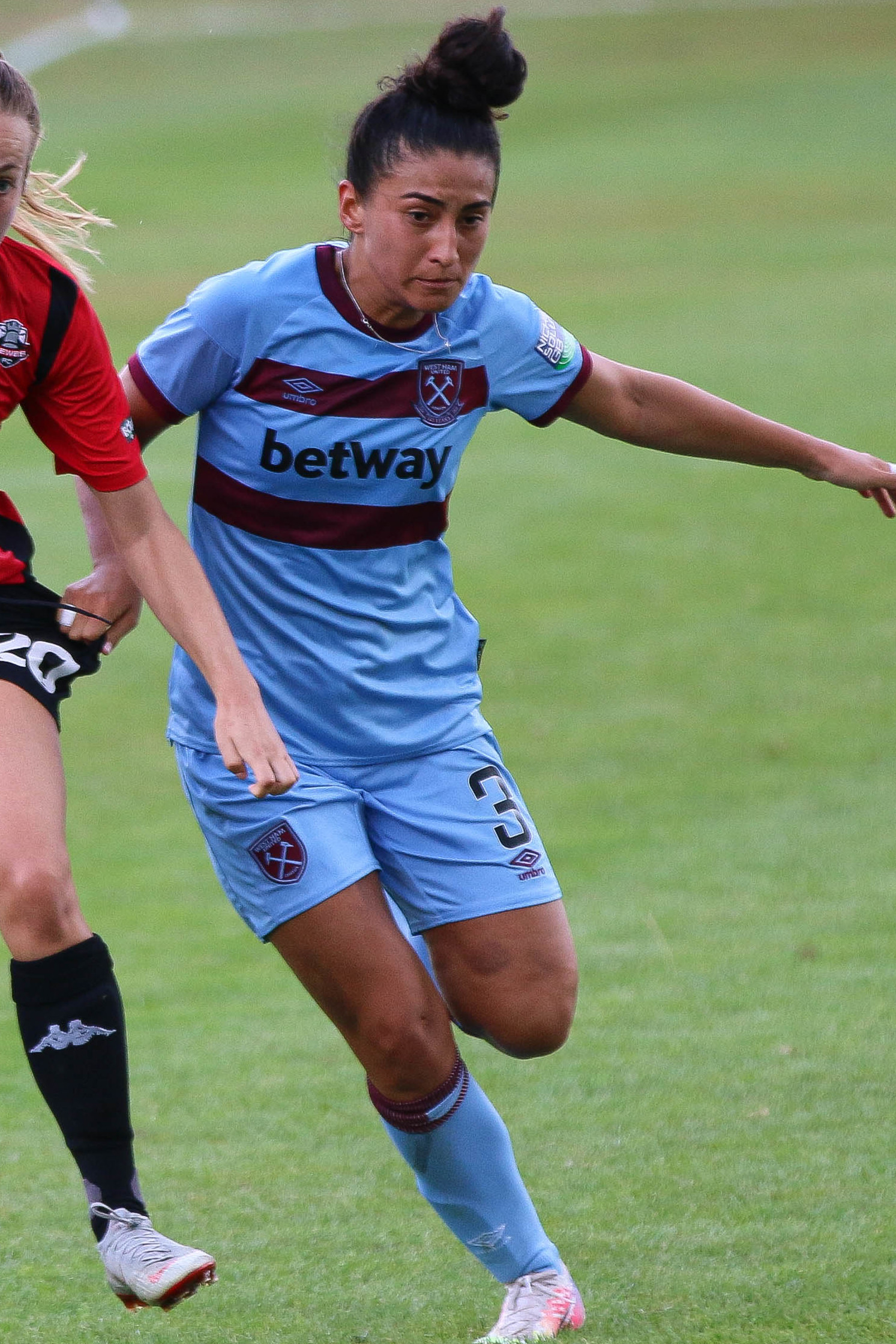
Maz Pacheco, 2020

- John Rimmer (1878–1962), track and field athlete, won two gold medals at the 1900 Summer Olympics
- Jimmy O'Neill (1931–2007) footballer, played 423 games, over 200 for Everton and 17 for Republic of Ireland.
- Billy Ayre (1952–2002), football player and manager, played over 300 games
- Tony Morley (born 1954), footballer, played 359 games, mainly for Aston Villa and 6 for England
- Vickey Dixon (born 1959), hockey player and team bronze medallist at the 1992 Summer Olympics
- John Deary (born 1962), footballer who played 586 games, mainly for Blackpool and Burnley
- Mark Kearney (born 1962), footballer who played over 470 games mainly for Mansfield Town
- Simon Kimber (born 1963), former cricketer who played 38 First-class cricket games
- Robbie Slater (born 1964), Australian footballer, played 447 games and 44 for Australia
- Duncan Ferguson (born 1971) footballer, played 360 games, mainly for Everton and 7 for Scotland
- John Hodge (born 1969), footballer, played over 340 games
- Mark Bonner (born 1974), footballer, played 355 games
- Kieran Dowell (born 1997), footballer at Hull City and England U20 World Cup Winner
- Stephen Warnock (born 1981), footballer, played 457 games
- Simon Richman (born 1990), footballer who played 468 games, mainly for Altrincham
- Wes Fletcher (born 1991), footballer, played 142 games
- Gavin Griffiths (born 1993), Leicestershire County cricket player, played 31 First-class cricket games
- Laura Jackson (born 1997), cricketer, she has played 37 List A cricket games
- Maz Pacheco (born 1998), Philippines and Aston Villa women footballer
- Michael Jones (born 1998), cricketer who has played 43 First-class cricket games
- Tom Hartley (born 1999), cricketer who has played 37 First-class cricket games and 5 Test cricket matches
- Ronan Darcy (born 2000), footballer for Wigan Athletic
- Max Dean (born 2004), footballer for Gent and formerly England U20

== Gallery ==
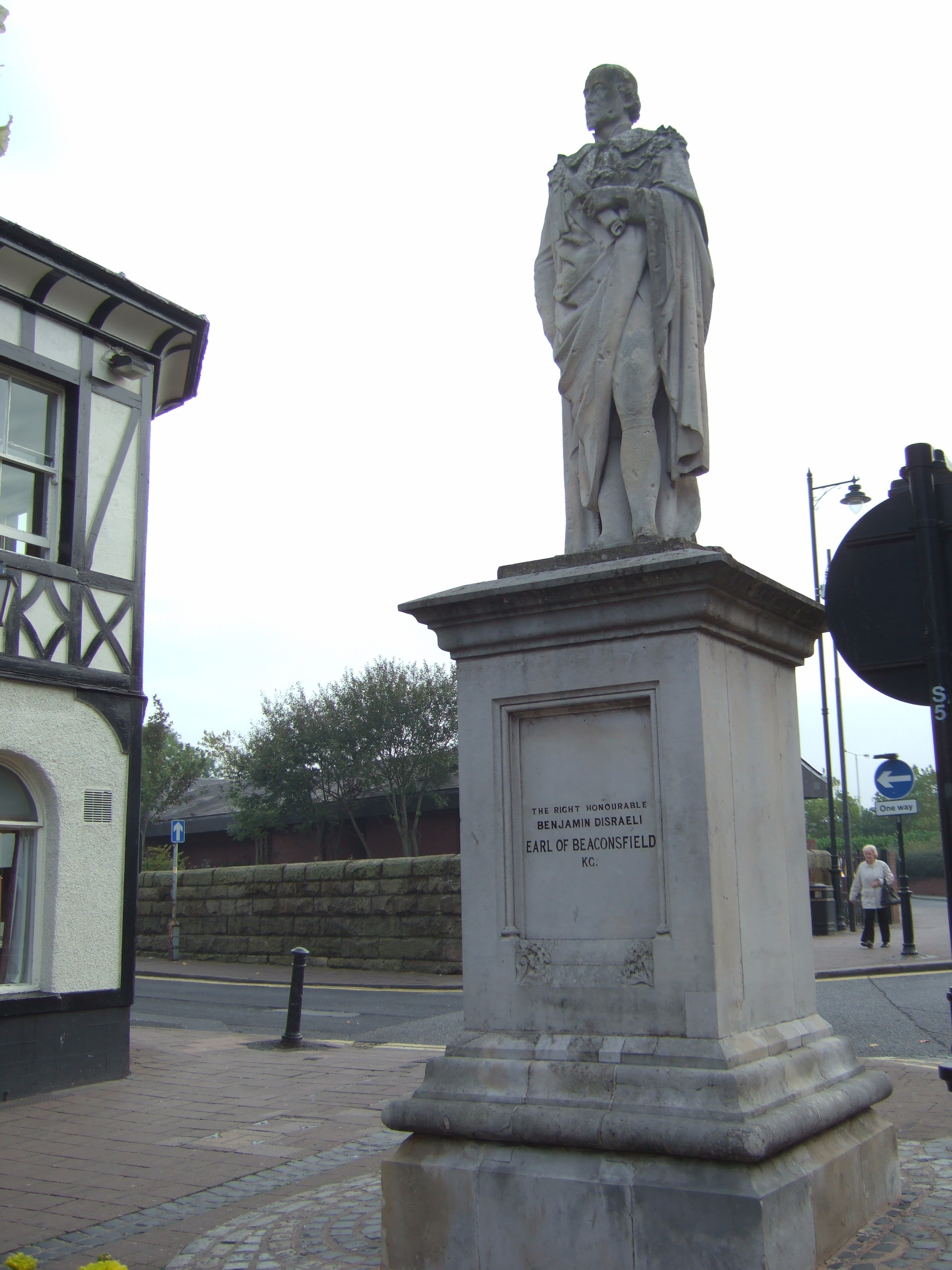
The Beaconsfield monument on Moor Street

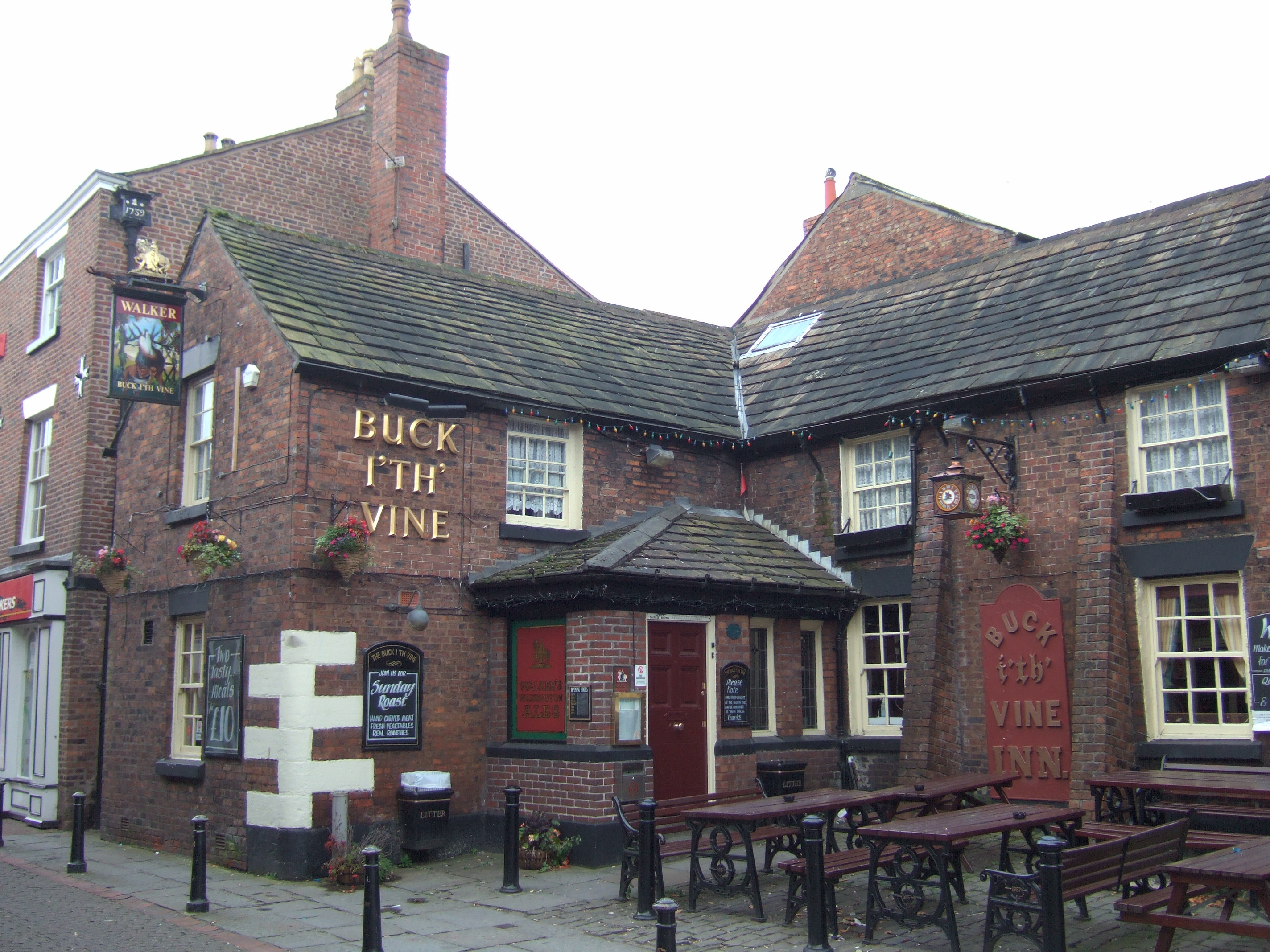
The Buck i'th' Vine Inn on Burscough Street

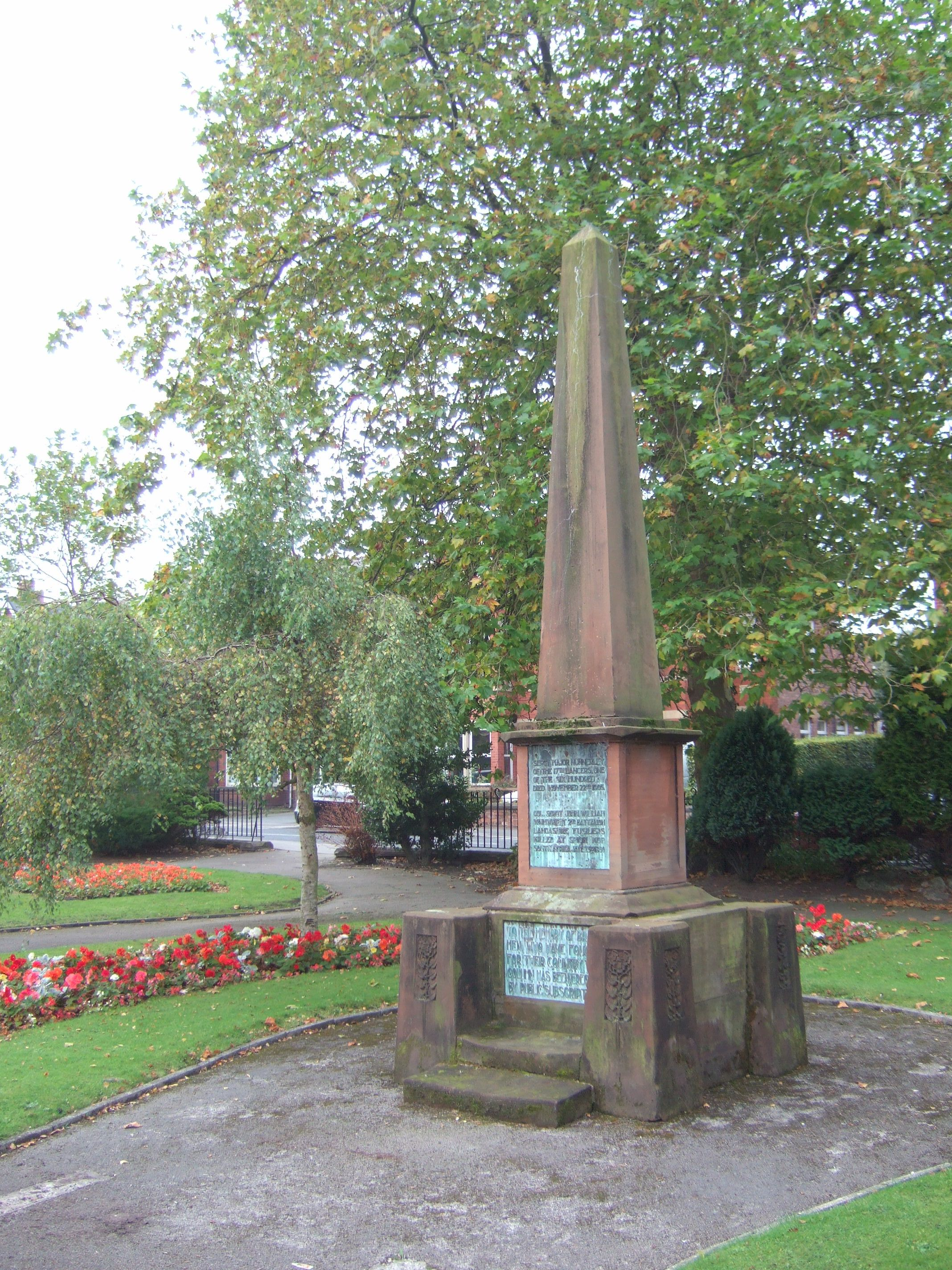
Memorial to Sergeant-Major Nunnerly in Victoria Gardens

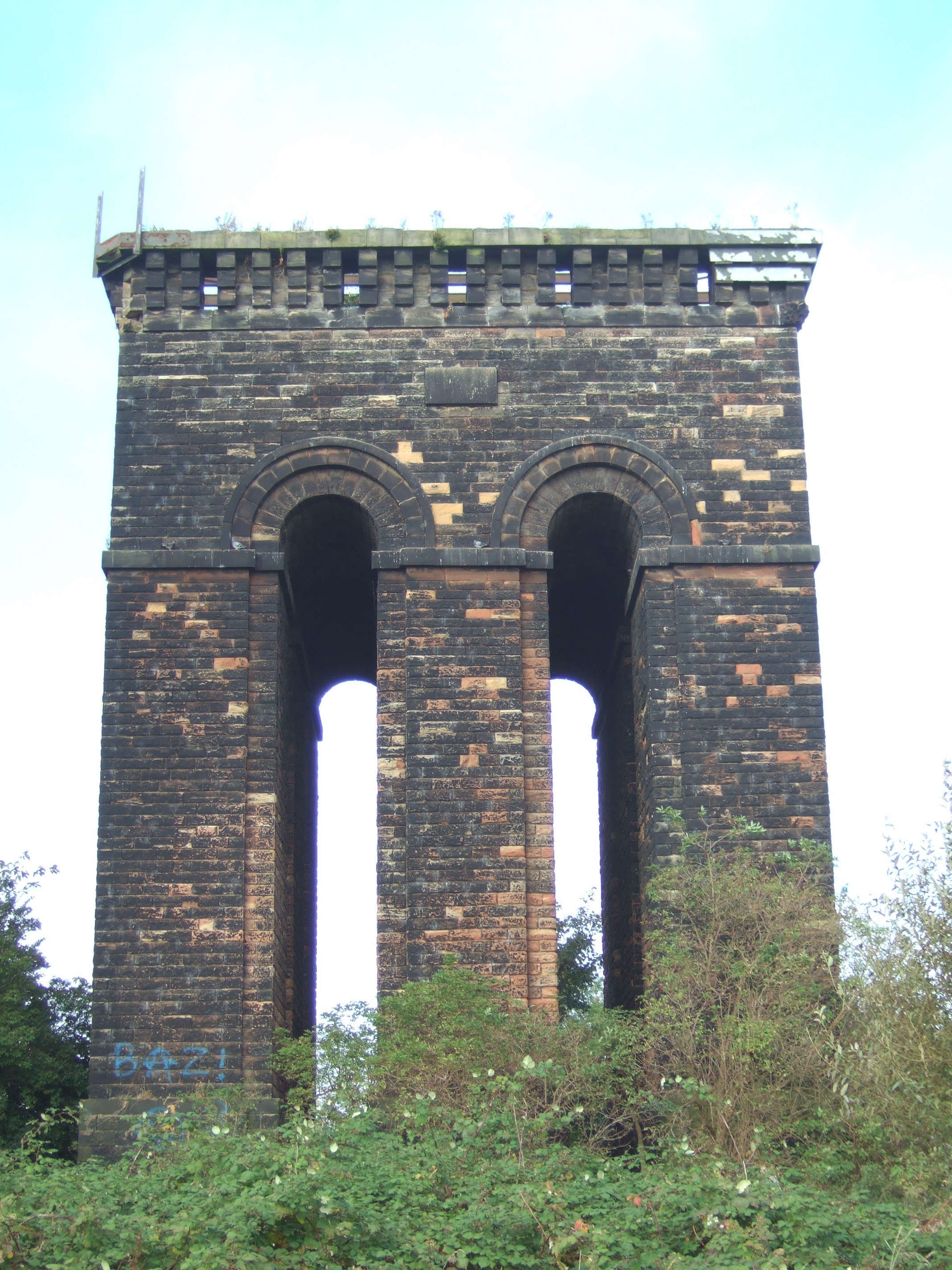
The old water tower on Tower Hill

== See also ==
- Listed buildings in Ormskirk
- Edge Hill University
- Ormskirk Urban District
- Ormskirk (constituency)
- West Lancashire (constituency)
