= List of ecclesiastical works by Paley and Austin =

Paley and Austin was the title of a practice of architects in Lancaster, Lancashire, England, in the 19th century. The practice had been founded in 1836 by Edmund Sharpe. The architects during the period covered by this list are E. G. Paley and Hubert Austin. E. G. Paley had joined Edmund Sharpe in partnership in 1845. This partnership continued until 1851, when Sharpe retired, and Paley ran the business as a single principal until he was joined by Hubert Austin in 1868. The partnership of Paley and Austin continued until they were joined as a partner by Paley's son, Henry Paley, in 1886.

This list covers the ecclesiastical works executed by the practice during the partnership of E. G. Paley and Hubert Austin. These works include new churches, restorations and alterations of older churches, additions to churches, and church fittings and furniture. The practice designed over 40 new churches and restored or modified many more. Because of the location of the practice, most of the ecclesiastical work was in the areas that are now Cumbria, Lancashire, and Greater Manchester, but examples can also be found in Cheshire, Merseyside, Yorkshire, Shropshire, Buckinghamshire, East Sussex, Kent, Wales, and Scotland.

== Key ==
†	Denotes a new church designed by the practice, or one completely rebuilt.
Grade (England and Wales)	Criteria
I	Buildings of exceptional interest, sometimes considered to be internationally important
II*	Particularly important buildings of more than special interest
II	Buildings of national importance and special interest
Category (Scotland)	Criteria
B	Buildings of special architectural or historic interest which are major examples of a particular period, style or building type.
U	Not listed

== Works ==
Name	Location	Photograph	Date (Note: The dates given in this column are the years in which the work was carried out. Sources vary in the dates they provide; the dates used are those given in Brandwood et al.)	Notes	Grade
Christ Church †	Ashford, Kent; 51.1396°N 0.8698°E	—	1867–68	This was Austin's first design, which was completed before he joined Paley. It is built in Kentish Ragstone with dressings in Bath Stone. It is relatively plain, with small lancet windows, and Geometric tracery in the east and west windows. As much of the money for its construction was provided by the shareholders of the South Eastern Railway Company it is known as "the railwayman's church".	II
St Michael's Church	Grimsargh, Lancashire; 53.7991°N 2.6356°W		1868	St Michael's originated as a small chapel in 1716, to which a north aisle and chancel were added in 1840. Paley and Austin added a new nave in Decorated style, and an embattled tower with a pyramidal roof.	II
St Mary's Church	Goosnargh, Lancashire; 53.8267°N 2.6707°W		1868–69	This late medieval church, which had been enlarged in the late 16th century, was restored. The nave was rebuilt, including the installation of dormer windows. The church was re-seated, re-roofed, and the galleries were removed.	II*
All Saints Church †	Burton in Lonsdale, North Yorkshire; 54.1438°N 2.5356°W		1868–70	All Saints is built in sandstone, and is in Early English style. The church consists of a nave with a north porch and a north aisle, a chancel, and a north vestry. On the south side, in the usual position of a transept, is a tower with a splay-footed spire.	II*
St Peter's Church	Heversham, Cumbria; 54.2437°N 2.7748°W		1868–70	The church stands on one of the oldest Christian sites in the former county of Westmorland. Although the body of the church is mainly Perpendicular, it contains a Norman south arcade. Paley and Austin rebuilt the tower in Early English style, and inside the church they rebuilt the tower arch, the north nave arcade, the chancel arch, the chapel arches, and the eastern part of the south arcade.	II*
St Oswald's Church	Thornton in Lonsdale, North Yorkshire; 54.1574°N 2.4827°W		1868–70	The tower dates from the 15th century, and the church contains three Norman arches. Otherwise it was completely rebuilt by Paley and Austin in Perpendicular style.. It is constructed in limestone with sandstone dressings, and consists of a nave with aisles and chapels, a chancel, a south porch, and a west tower. The church was badly damaged by fire in the 1930s and was rebuilt by the successors in the practice, Austin and Paley.	II*
St Mary's Church †	Walton, Cumbria; 54.9727°N 2.7480°W		1869	St Mary's was built on the site of a former medieval church. It is constructed in sandstone, and consists of a nave, a north aisle, a chancel, and a northwest tower. The tower contains a porch, and has a staircase turret and a pyramidal roof with small louvres. The two sides of the church differ, the south side being sheer, the north side having a cat-slide roof over the aisle. Other than a rose window at the west end, the windows are lancets.	II*
St Oswald's Church	Winwick, Cheshire; 53.4308°N 2.5979°W		1869	The church has a long and complex history, with fabric dating back to the 13th century and a tower of 1358. More alterations were carried out in the 16th, the 18th, and the early 19th centuries, and in 1846–49 A. W. N. Pugin designed a new chancel and vestry. Paley and Austin restored the church, and rebuilt its spire.	I
Church of St John the Evangelist, Cheetham Hill †	Cheetham, Greater Manchester; 53.5051°N 2.2426°W		1869–71	Constructed in sandstone with tiled roofs and a brick-lined interior, the church combines features of Transitional and Early English styles. It consists of a nave and chancel in one vessel, with an apsidal east end, and a southwest tower. The tower is surmounted by a pyramidal cap that is split into two tiers with small turrets at the corners, a feature unique in Paley and Austin's designs. The wooden carving on the choir stalls and pulpit anticipate features to be found later in Art Nouveau designs.	II*
St Chad's Church †	Kirkby, Merseyside; 53.4843°N 2.8931°W		1869–71	St Chad's stands on an ancient Christian site, and the church replaces at least two previous churches or chapels. It was paid for by the 4th Earl of Sefton. The church is built in sandstone with red tiled roofs, and has features of Transitional and early Gothic styles. It consists of a nave with aisles, north and south porches, a tower at the crossing, and a short chancel. The tower has a saddleback roof, and is supported by large buttresses that enclose a chapel and an organ loft.	II*
St Martin's Church	Bowness-on-Windermere, Cumbria; 54.3641°N 2.9210°W		1870–72	A church has been on the site since 1203, but the present church originates from about 1483. Paley and Austin carried out an extension programme of restoration and rebuilding, including a new chancel and vestry, heightening the tower, to which they added a saddleback roof and a stair turret, re-seating the church, and designing new fittings and furniture.	I
All Saints' Church	Daresbury, Cheshire; 53.3406°N 2.6312°W		1870–72	The church was rebuilt, other than its 16th-century tower. The church is constructed in sandstone with slate roofs, and is in Perpendicular style. The body of the church consists of a nave with a clerestory, a tall south aisle, a low north aisle, north and south chapels, and a chancel. The oak benches contain finely carved tracery.	II*
St James' Church	Melsonby, North Yorkshire; 54.4710°N 1.6911°W		1870–72	St James' dates from the 12th and 13th centuries. Paley and Austin carried out a restoration, which included rebuilding the chancel, re-roofing the nave, and adding a new porch and a vestry. In rebuilding the chancel they replaced the Perpendicular east window with a triple lancet window. They also designed the font.	II*
Church of St Matthew and St James †	Mossley Hill, Liverpool, Merseyside; 53.3763°N 2.9206°W		1870–75	The church was funded by the bequest of a wealthy Liverpool merchant. It is a large church, constructed in sandstone, and is in the style of the 13th century. The church consists of a nave with a clerestory, aisles with north and south porches, transepts, and a chancel with a north organ loft and, to the south, a chapel and an octagonal vestry. Above the crossing is a large tower with a stair turret, a parapet with corner pinnacles, and a pyramidal roof topped by a finial. The pews are carved with a variety of tracery patterns.	II*
St James' Church	Burton-in-Kendal, Cumbria; 54.1859°N 2.7210°W		1871	The tower and part of the nave date from the 12th century, and additions and alterations were made in the following 3–4 centuries. Paley and Austin restored the church; this included removing the west gallery, demolishing the north wall of the chancel to build an organ chamber and vestry, re-seating the church, remodelling the pulpit, designing a new font, and re-flooring the chancel.	I
All Saints Church	Higher Walton, Lancashire; 53.7408°N 2.6407°W		1871	All Saints had been built in 1861–62 and was designed by Paley. The new partnership added a broach spire, on which are four clock faces under small gables.	II
St Mary's Church	Knowsley, Merseyside; 53.4562°N 2.8528°W		1871–72	The church was designed by Edmund Sharpe, and built for the 13th Earl of Derby in 1843–44. Paley added transepts to it in 1860. Paley and Austin designed a memorial chapel to the 14th Earl, which contained a statue by Matthew Noble.	II*
St Bartholomew's Church	Penn, West Midlands; 52.5553°N 2.1571°W		1871–72	St Bartholomew's dates back to the 14th century. The restoration included extending the nave and the south aisle, rebuilding the chancel, and adding a south chapel. At the time the vicar of the church was Paley's younger brother, Revd Francis Henry Paley.	II*
St Mary's Church	Leigh, Greater Manchester; 53.4983°N 2.5198°W		1871–73	St Mary's was a medieval church with a tower dating from 1516. Paley and Austin retained the tower but rebuilt the rest of the church on the original foundations in Perpendicular style. It is constructed in sandstone, the body of the church consisting of a nave and chancel under one roof, aisles, an embattled clerestory, a chapel, and a south porch.	II*
St Cuthbert's Church	Lytham St Annes, Lancashire; 53.7374°N 2.9762°W		1872	The church had been rebuilt in 1834, replacing an earlier church on the site. Paley and Austin enlarged the chancel in 1872, and in 1882 they added a north aisle, a vestry, and an organ chamber.	II*
St Mary's Church	Prestwich, Greater Manchester; 53.5294°N 2.2866°W		1872	The two eastern bays of the north aisle form the Wilton Chapel, rebuilt by Austin and Paley in 1872. Pevsner is uncertain whether they were merely restoring what was already present or erecting original work. In 1888–89 Paley, Austin and Paley again rebuilt the north (Wilton) chapel as well as the chancel, adding an organ chamber and a vestry on the north side of the chancel, east of the Wilton Chapel.	I
St Mary's Church †	Betws-y-Coed, Conwy, Wales; 53.0914°N 3.8028°W		1872–73	St Mary's was built to replace a smaller church nearby to serve the increasing numbers of summer visitors. The commission to design it was won by Austin in a competition. It is in Transitional style, and has a cruciform plan with a tower at the crossing.	II*
St Anne's Church †	St Annes, Lancashire; 53.7565°N 3.0226°W		1872–73	The church was built as a chapel of ease to St Cuthbert, Lytham and paid for by the Clifton family. It is constructed in red brick with pebble inlay and sandstone dressings, and has a red pantile roof. Paley and Austin designed the nave, chancel and south aisle. The north aisle, transept, vestry and tower were added later, to designs by R. Knill Freeman.	II
St Andrew's Church †	Livesey, Blackburn, Lancashire; 53.7284°N 2.5012°W	—	1872–77	St Andrew's was designed by Paley, and consists of a nave with lancet windows, large transepts with rose windows, and a polygonal apse. The tracery in the east and west windows is in Geometrical style. A tower with a broach spire was planned, but only the first stage of the tower was completed.	U
St Maxentius' Church †	Bradshaw, South Turton, Bolton, Greater Manchester; 53.6058°N 2.4013°W		1872–78	This church replaced a chapel of ease dating from 1640 or earlier on a nearby site, whose tower still stands. It was designed by Paley, and consists of a nave, chancel, transepts, and a vestry, with a bellcote on the west gable. The church is in Decorated style with Geometric tracery.	U
St John the Evangelist's Church	Clifton, Lancashire; 53.7761°N 2.8161°W		1873	St John's had been built in 1824–25, replacing an earlier church, and the chancel was added in 1852. Paley and Austin prepared plans for more extensive work on the church, but in the end only the tower was built; this has a large octagonal stair turret rising higher than the parapet of the tower.	U
St Andrew's Church	Kildwick, North Yorkshire; 53.9091°N 1.9840°W		1873	The church dates from the 14th century, and was extended in the 16th and 17th centuries. Between 1864 and 1875 the church was repaired and re-ordered; this included Paley and Austin's restoration.	I
St Cuthbert's Church	Halsall, Lancashire; 53.5855°N 2.9523°W		1873, 1886	St Cuthbert's was built in the 14th century, with the tower added during the following century. In 1873 Paley and Austin restored the chancel and repaved the church at a cost of £2,000. In 1886 they carried out more extensive work, largely rebuilding the nave, the aisles, and the south porch. They also re-seated and re-roofed the church, the total cost of this being £7,000.	I
St Mary Magdalene's Church	Broughton-in-Furness, Cumbria; 54.2760°N 3.2157°W		1873–74	The oldest part of the church is its 12th-century south entrance, and other parts date from the 16th century. Paley and Austin restored the church and largely rebuilt parts of it. This included adding a new nave and chancel to the north of the existing ones, stripping the plaster from the walls, re-seating the church, and removing the west gallery, all at a cost of over £3,000.	II
St Peter's Church †	Finsthwaite, Cumbria; 54.2821°N 2.9711°W		1873–74	St Peter's replaced a smaller chapel of 1724. It is described as "the first of Paley and Austin's great village churches", and is in Romanesque Revival style, with round-headed windows and doorways. The church has a large central tower surmounted by a pyramidal roof placed between the nave and the chancel. There are no transepts, but the tower is supported by broad buttresses.	II*
Methodist Chapel, Sulyard Street †	Lancaster, Lancashire; 54.0482°N 2.7967°W	—	1873–74	This was built as a chapel for the Wesleyan Methodist Church at a cost of over £6,000. It provided seating for 520 on the ground floor and 506 in the galleries, and there were schools in the basement. The chapel has been into flats.	U
St John the Evangelist's Church †	Osmotherley, Cumbria; 54.2300°N 3.1077°W		1873–74	Built in slate with red sandstone dressings, the church has a slate roof with tile cresting. It is described by Brandwood et al. as a "very modest affair". The church cost about £1,400 and seats about 150 people. It contains lancet windows, a rounded apse, and a timber bellcote.	II
St Wilfrid's Church	Grappenhall, Cheshire; 53.3723°N 2.5435°W		1874	The church dates from the 12th century, with a chapel dating from about 1334, and the tower and most of the rest of the church from 1525 to 1539. There were restorations in the 19th century, including one by Paley and Austin in 1874, when the floors and roofs were replaced. It is also probable that the north transept, the south porch, and the east window date from this restoration.	I
Trinity Presbyterian Church †	Barrow-in-Furness, Cumbria; 54.1128°N 3.2238°W		1874–75	Built for a mainly Scots Presbyterian congregation, the church is in Romanesque Revival style. It cost over £5,000 and provided seating for 730 people. The church is built in limestone with sandstone dressings and has a slate roof. The west front has a square tower on the left, an apsidal projection on the right, and a rose window in the gable between them. The church closed in the late 20th century, and was used as a warehouse, but it was severely damaged by fire in 2005.	II
St Margaret's Church †	Burnage, Greater Manchester; 53.4309°N 2.2018°W		1874–75	St Margaret's was built on land given by Lord Egerton of Tatton Park, and is in Decorated style. Initially it consisted of nave, a chancel and a south aisle, providing seating for about 200 people. In 1881–82 Paley and Austin added a bellcote, and in 1885 they built a clergy vestry, and designed a reredos and an organ screen.	II
St Thomas' Church †	Crosscrake, Cumbria; 54.2764°N 2.7330°W		1874–75	Constructed in square slate blocks, and in the style of the late 12th and early 13th century, the church replaced an earlier one of 1773. It originally had a tower with a saddleback roof, but this had to be reduced, and eventually removed, because of structural problems. Paley and Austin also designed the furnishings, including a large square font.	U
St Thomas' Church †	Halliwell, Bolton, Greater Manchester; 53.5926°N 2.4427°W		1874–75	St Thomas' is a large brick church with minimal stone dressings and a green slate roof. It was built at a cost of £6,400, and provided seating for 849 people. The church consists of a wide nave with a clerestory, aisles, a chancel, a south vestry forming a transept, and north and south porches. There is a bellcote on the transept. The style is Early English with lancet windows. There are also two rose windows in each of the east and west ends.	II*
Holy Trinity Church	Little Ouseburn, North Yorkshire; 54.0443°N 1.3107°W		1874–75	The church dates from the 11th century, with later additions and alterations. Paley and Austin's restoration included rebuilding the north aisle and the east wall, resiting the east window at a higher level, raising the height of the chancel, building an organ chamber, renewing the roof, and designing new fittings.	I
St Mary's Church	Llanrwst, Conwy, Wales; 53.1359°N 3.7930°W	—	1874–75	St Mary's had been built in 1841–42 to a design by Henry Kennedy. Paley and Austin extended the chancel eastward, tripling its size, and reseated the church, at a cost of £925. The church has been largely demolished, only fragments of its walls remaining.	U
St George's Church †	Millom, Cumbria; 54.2088°N 3.2718°W		1874–77	The church is built in red sandstone, and has a tower at the crossing with a recessed spire. The plan is asymmetrical, consisting of a nave with a north aisle, a north transept, a south vestry, and a chancel. The tracery is in Geometrical style.	II
St Michael's Church	Whittington, Lancashire; 54.1808°N 2.6149°W		1875	Apart from the 16th-century tower, the church was largely rebuilt, mostly at the expense of Colonel Greene of Whittington Hall. The body of the church consists of a nave with a clerestory, and a chancel, under one roof, and north and south aisles. The windows contain Perpendicular tracery.	II*
St Luke's Church †	Winmarleigh, Lancashire; 53.9252°N 2.8070°W		1875–76	St Luke's was paid for by Lord Winmarleigh. It is built in sandstone, and consists of a nave that is continuous with the chancel, a south porch, and a north chapel and vestry. Between the nave and the chancel is a bellcote with a weatherboarded spire. The church includes features of Decorated and Perpendicular styles.	II
Church of St Michael and All Angels †	Howe Bridge, Atherton, Greater Manchester; 53.5176°N 2.5070°W		1875–77	Built in the style of the 13th century, the church consists of a nave with side chapels, transepts, a chancel with a clerestory, and a partly timber-framed north porch. Near the junction of the nave and chancel is a two-tier flèche. The nave has a timber roof, and the chancel is roofed in stone vaulting.	II*
St Wilfrid's Church	Halton, Lancashire; 54.0759°N 2.7673°W		1876–77	Paley and Austin rebuilt the body of the church of 1792, but retained the west tower dating from 1597, at a cost of about £3,500. It is constructed in sandstone with a tiled roof, and is in Decorated style. The body of the church consists of a nave, a north aisle, and a chancel. There is a two-storey porch, with a timber-framed upper storey. The nave arcade is carried on alternating octagonal and clustered columns.	II
St Mary's Church	Westham, East Sussex; 50.8175°N 0.3290°E		1876–77	The church dates from the 13th century, with alterations in the 14th century. It is built in flint with stone dressings and has a tiled roof. Paley and Austin carried out a restoration and re-seating at a cost of £3,000; the seating was increased from 297 to 403.	I
St Cuthbert's Church †	Darwen, Lancashire; 53.7053°N 2.4781°W		1876–78	St Cuthbert's is constructed in sandstone with a slate roof. As built by Austin and Paley, it consisted of a nave with a clerestory, aisles, and a chancel with a vestry and a south chapel. The final cost of the church, excluding the site, came to £5,925. The plan to build an additional west bay to the nave, and a northwest steeple were not carried out, although a west tower was added in 1907–08.	II
St Laurence's Church †	Morecambe, Lancashire; 54.0713°N 2.8684°W	—	1876–78	The church is built in sandstone with tiled roofs, and is in Decorated style. Its estimated cost was £8,680, and it consists of a nave and chancel with clerestories, aisles, porches, a chapel and a vestry. The plan was to build a northwest tower and spire, but this did not materialise. The church is now redundant.	II
Churches of St Mark, St Luke, St Matthew and St John †	Barrow-in-Furness, Cumbria		1877–78	Four identical temporary churches were built in brick and timber to serve the rapidly growing population. The total cost, including the parsonages was £24,000, donations being given by the Duke of Devonshire, the Duke of Buccleuch, Lord Frederick Cavendish, Sir James Ramsden, and H. W. Schneider. St Mark's was enlarged in 1882–83, and is the only one to have survived.	U
St Mary's Church	Nether Alderley, Cheshire; 53.2820°N 2.2389°W		1877–78	Paley and Austin carried out a restoration at an estimated cost of £520. This included lowering the floor, underpinning the south arcade, reseating the church, and removing the plaster from the walls.	I
St Mary's Church †	Beswick, Greater Manchester	—	1877–78	New church, built partly as a memorial to James Prince Lee, the first Bishop of Manchester. It provided seating for 600 people, and had a seven-light west window. Its estimated cost was £8,700. The church was demolished in 1966.	U
St John the Evangelist's Church †	Greenock, Inverclyde, Scotland; 55.9511°N 4.7654°W	—	1877–78	St John's was built for the Scottish Episcopal Church and replaced a church of 1824 at a cost of slightly more than £7,000. It is in Gothic Revival style, and consists of a nave with a clerestory, a chancel, a chapel, and a southeast tower with a pyramidal roof. The nave arcades are carried on alternating octagonal and circular piers.	B
St Clement's Church †	Ordsall, Greater Manchester; 53.4724°N 2.2760°W		1877–78	The church was paid for, and the land was given, by Lord Egerton. It is built in brick with terracotta dressings, and consists of a nave with a clerestory, aisles, and a chancel. At the junction of the nave and chancel is a slate-clad flèche. Along the sides of the aisles are three—light windows, and the clerestory windows are circular. At the west end is a decorative double porch.	II
All Saints Church	Orton, Cumbria; 54.4695°N 2.5845°W		1877–78	All Saints dates from the 13th century, but is mainly Perpendicular in style. Paley and Austin restored the church, and rebuilt the north aisle and the chancel, the latter bring much taller than the nave.	II*
St James' Church †	Broughton, Greater Manchester; 53.5054°N 2.2521°W		1877–79	This brick church was built at a cost of £7,000 and provided seating for 600 people. It consists of a nave with a north aisle, and a chancel. There is little internal division between the nave and the chancel, but it is marked externally by a large buttress on the south side. There is a bellcote at the east end of the nave, and an octagonal stair turret at the west end.	U
St Peter and St Paul's Church	Ormskirk, Lancashire; 53.5692°N 2.8877°W		1877–91	Paley and Austin carried out a series of alteration to this church, which dates from the 12th century. In 1877–78 they re-floored the church and partly re-seated it, and in 1879 they removed the north and south galleries, and refurbished the chancel. Between 1881 and 1884 they did some work on the west tower, re-hung the bells, and restored the Derby Chapel. In 1885 they started a series of works, including rebuilding parts of the church, which was to continue until 1891.	II*
St Mary the Virgin's Church	Willingdon, East Sussex; 50.7998°N 0.2541°E		1878	St Mary's goes back to the 12th or 13th century, although most of the church dates back to the 14th and 15th centuries. The chancel was built in about 1400. Paley and Austin restored the north aisle, and possibly also added a fourth arch to the arcade.	I
St John the Baptist's Church †	Atherton, Greater Manchester; 53.5239°N 2.4902°W		1878–79	Initially only the chancel and the first three bays of the nave were built under a continuous roof, the church being extended later. It is in late Decorated style with varying tracery, particularly in the clerestory windows. A new feature for the partnership was the use of doubled main mullions in the west window. Below the east window is chequerwork in red and buff stone, with various designs, including roses and swords.	II
St Peter's Church †	Leck, Lancashire; 54.1838°N 2.5484°W		1878–79	St Peter's was built to replace and earlier church on the site. It cost £3,000, and provided seating for 224 people. The church is constructed in sandstone, and consists of a nave, a north aisle, a timber south porch, a north vestry, and a west tower with an octagonal slated spire. It was badly damaged by fire in 1913, and rebuilt by the successors in the practice two years later following the original designs.	II
St Peter's Church †	Scorton, Lancashire; 53.9312°N 2.7589°W		1878–79	The church was built for the Ormrod family of Wyresdale Hall in Decorated style, and cost between £13,000 and £15,000. It is constructed in sandstone with a red tile roof, and contains 250 seats. The plan consists of a nave and a chancel under a continuous roof, a north aisle, a south porch, and a west tower with a shingled broach spire.	II
All Saints Church	Thorpe Bassett, North Yorkshire; 54.1498°N 0.6875°W		1878–79	Paley and Austin carried out work costing over £2,000 on this church, which dates from the 12th century. They rebuilt the previously demolished north aisle on its original foundations, and reopened the blocked north arcade. The chancel was rebuilt, a vestry and a porch were added, and the bellcote was rebuilt.	II*
New St Leonard's Church †	Langho, Lancashire; 53.8102°N 2.4393°W		1878–80	The church was built to replace an older church on a different site 1 mile (1.6 km) away. It cost £4,350, and provided seating for 346 people. The original plan included a larger nave and a west tower with a saddleback roof, but these were never built. The church consists of a nave with a south aisle, a chancel with a north vestry, and a bellcote on the west gable.	U
All Souls Church †	Astley Bridge, Bolton, Greater Manchester; 53.5937°N 2.4339°W		1878–81	All Souls is a large brick church built for the local Evangelical mill owner Thomas Greenhalgh at a cost of £23,000. It has a nave 52 feet (15.8 m) wide with six bays, and without aisles. The east end of the chancel is canted. Along the sides of the church are large three-light windows containing a mixture of Decorated and Perpendicular tracery. The church is now redundant.	II*
St Michael's Church	Kirkby Malham, North Yorkshire; 54.0449°N 2.1633°W		1879–80	The church dates from the 15th century. Paley and Austin carried out a restoration which is said to have been "conservative" and to retain as much as was possible of the original work.	I
St Peter's Church †	Mansergh, Cumbria; 54.2385°N 2.6115°W		1879–80	St Peter's was built to replace an earlier church on the site. It is constructed in dark limestone with bands of lighter sandstone. The church is in late Perpendicular style, and has a west tower with a longitudinal saddleback roof and an embattled parapet on the north and south sides. The body of the church consists of a nave with a south porch, a north transept, and a chancel with a north vestry.	II
Holy Trinity Church	Wray, Lancashire; 54.1025°N 2.6074°W		1879–80	The church had been built in 1839–40, and was designed by Edmund Sharpe. Paley and Austin reseated the church, rebuilt the chancel, which is at a higher level than the nave, and added an organ chamber and a porch. The cost of this amounted to £1,307.	U
St James' Church †	Daisy Hill, Westhoughton, Greater Manchester; 53.5346°N 2.5180°W		1879–81	St James' is constructed in brick and terracotta, it provided seating for 410 people, and cost £6,500. The church is mainly in Perpendicular style, with some Decorated features. Its plan consists of a wide nave without aisles, a north porch, a chancel, and a north transept and vestry. Attached to the south wall of the chancel is a five-stage bell-turret. The top stage contain a single bell opening, and the stage below has two bell openings.	II*
St Peter's Church †	Westleigh, Leigh, Greater Manchester; 53.4984°N 2.5376°W		1879–81	The church cost £7,000 and seated 460 people. It is built in brick, with dressings in Runcorn sandstone, and has a mixture of Perpendicular and Decorated features. It consists of a nave, a north aisle, a south porch, a chancel and a north vestry. Over the eastern part of the nave is a tower with a pyramidal roof.	II*
Holy Trinity Church	Ulverston, Cumbria; 54.1938°N 3.0978°W	—	1880	Holy Trinity was a Commissioners' Church designed by Anthony Salvin in 1839–32. Paley and Austin re-ordered the interior, and added a short chancel. The church is now redundant.	II
St Bartholomew's Church	Great Harwood, Lancashire; 53.7901°N 2.4055°W		1880–81	The tower of the church dates from the 15th century, and the rest of the church from the following century. Paley and Austin lengthened the nave by one bay, built a new chancel, a vestry and an organ chamber at a cost of £2,000. The seating was increased from 377 to 470.	II*
St John's Church †	Hutton Roof, Cumbria; 54.2031°N 2.6617°W		1880–81	New church in Perpendicular style.	II
St Cross Church †	Knutsford, Cheshire; 53.3034°N 2.3670°W		1880–81	New church in Perpendicular style.	II*
St Michael's Church (now Holy Trinity Church)	Bolton-le-Sands, Lancashire; 54.1028°N 2.7917°W		1881	Restoration, especially of the nave.	II*
St Mary Magdalene's Church	Clitheroe, Lancashire; 53.8742°N 2.3905°W		1881	Restoration.	II*
St James' Church	Altham, Lancashire; 53.7936°N 2.3480°W		1881	Rebuilt a chapel.	II*
St Catherine's Church	Boot, Cumbria; 54.3911°N 3.2706°W		1881	Restoration.	II
Cartmel Priory	Cartmel, Cumbria; 54.2011°N 2.9523°W		1881 (?)	Restoration, including the Cavendish tomb.	I
St Mary's Church	Windermere, Cumbria; 54.3809°N 2.9103°W		1881–82	Additions.	II
St Mark's Church	Blackburn, Lancashire; 53.7439°N 2.5083°W		1881–87	Restoration and enlargement including the north transept and a vestry.	II*
St John the Baptist's Church	Waberthwaite, Cumbria		1882	Restoration, including reflooring and reseating the church, and carrying out external repairs.	II*
St Mary's Church	Fawley, Buckinghamshire; 51.5742°N 0.9141°W		1882–83	Restoration and enlargement.	II*
St Mary and St Peter's Church †	Wilmington, East Sussex; 50.8175°N 0.1906°E		1882–83	Rebuilding of an older church.	I
St John the Evangelist's Church †	Walton, Warrington, Cheshire; 53.3626°N 2.6049°W		1882–84	New church in Decorated style.	II*
St Saviour's Church †	Astley Bridge, Bolton, Greater Manchester	—	1882–85	New church in Decorated style. Demolished 1975.	U
St Peter's Church	Fleetwood, Lancashire; 53.9239°N 3.0094°W		1883	East end remodelled, adding a chancel, a chapel to the south, and an organ chamber to the north.	II
St Mary the Virgin's Church	Great Ouseburn, North Yorkshire; 54.0500°N 1.3156°W		1883	Addition of a south chapel.	II*
St George's Church	Barrow-in-Furness, Cumbria; 54.1084°N 3.2209°W		1883–84	Additions.	II
St Helen's Church	Northwich, Cheshire		1883–84	Additions and alterations including adding a vestry and creating a baptistry.	I
St Mary's Church †	Dalton-in-Furness, Cumbria; 54.1549°N 3.1870°W		1884–85	New church in Decorated style, replacing a church rebuilt by George Webster in 1825–30.	II*
St Barnabas' Church †	Darwen, Lancashire; 53.6817°N 2.4584°W		1884	New church.	U
St Grwst's Church	Llanrwst, Conwy, Wales; 53.1381°N 3.7992°W		1884	Restored the church and added a north aisle.	I
St Mary's Church	Shrewsbury, Shropshire; 52.7087°N 2.7513°W		1884	Added a vestry to the north. The church is now redundant.	I
St Luke's Church †	Torver, Cumbria; 54.3382°N 3.1022°W		1884	New church in Norman style.	II
St Nicholas' Church	Wrea Green, Lancashire; 53.7771°N 2.9155°W		1884	Addition of tower and spire.	II
St Mary's Church †	Dalton-in-Furness, Cumbria; 54.1549°N 3.1870°W		1884–85	New church in Decorated style.	II*
St John the Baptist's Church †	Pilling, Lancashire; 53.9303°N 2.9107°W		1884–87	New church.	II*
St Peter and St Paul's Church	Bolton-by-Bowland, Lancashire; 53.9402°N 2.3267°W		1885–86	Restored and added a new roof.	I
St Barnabas' Church †	Crewe, Cheshire; 53.1020°N 2.4628°W		1885–86	New church in Perpendicular style; built at the expense of the London and North Western Railway.	II
Ripley School Chapel †	Lancaster, Lancashire; 54.0397°N 2.8005°W	—	1886–88	New school chapel.	II*
St Peter's Church (now Lancaster Cathedral)	Lancaster, Lancashire; 54.04690°N 2.79335°W		1888	Rose window in the transept and other additions.	II*
St Silas' Church †	Blackburn, Lancashire; 53.7516°N 2.5074°W		1894–98	A new church in Decorated style, with the tower added in 1913–14. Although it was not built until this late date, it had been designed in 1878.	II*
Christ Church	Walmsley, Turton, Bolton, Greater Manchester; 53.6236°N 2.4389°W		Undated	Additions.	II

== Notes and references ==
Notes

Citations

Sources

- Brandwood, Geoff; Austin, Tim; Hughes, John; Price, James (2012), The Architecture of Sharpe, Paley and Austin, Swindon: English Heritage, ISBN 978-1-84802-049-8
- Hartwell, Clare; Hyde, Matthew; Pevsner, Nikolaus (2004), The Buildings of England: Lancashire: Manchester and the South-East, New Haven and London: Yale University Press, ISBN 0-300-10583-5
- Hartwell, Clare; Hyde, Matthew; Hubbard, Edward; Pevsner, Nikolaus (2011) [1971], Cheshire, The Buildings of England, New Haven and London: Yale University Press, ISBN 978-0-300-17043-6
- Hartwell, Clare; Pevsner, Nikolaus (2009) [1969], The Buildings of England. Lancashire: North, New Haven and London: Yale University Press, ISBN 978-0-300-12667-9
- Hubbard, Edward (1986), The Buildings of Wales: Clwyd, London: Penguin, ISBN 0-14-071052-3
- Hyde, Matthew; Pevsner, Nikolaus (2010) [1967], Cumbria, The Buildings of England, New Haven and London: Yale University Press, ISBN 978-0-300-12663-1
- Newman, John; Pevsner, Nikolaus (2006), The Buildings of England: Shropshire, New Haven and London: Yale University Press, ISBN 0-300-12083-4
- Pevsner, Nikolaus; Hubbard, Edward (2003) [1971], The Buildings of England: Cheshire, New Haven and London: Yale University Press, ISBN 0-300-09588-0
- Pollard, Richard; Pevsner, Nikolaus (2006), The Buildings of England: Lancashire: Liverpool and the South-West, New Haven and London: Yale University Press, ISBN 0-300-10910-5
- Price, James (1998), Sharpe, Paley and Austin: A Lancaster Architectural Practice 1836–1942, Lancaster: Centre for North-West Regional Studies, ISBN 1-86220-054-8
