= Scorton =

Scorton may refer to several places in the United Kingdom:

- Scorton, Lancashire
- Scorton, North Yorkshire
