= Wyresdale =

Wyresdale is the valley of the River Wyre in Lancashire, England.

It may refer to one of two civil parishes:

- Nether Wyresdale, Wyre
- Over Wyresdale, City of Lancaster
