= St John's Church, Hutton Roof =

Coordinates: 54.2031°N 2.6617°W

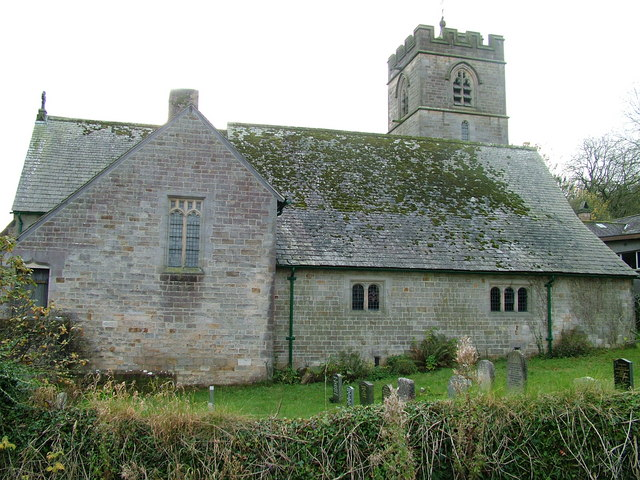
- St John's Church, Hutton Roof, from the north

- Location in Cumbria
- OS grid reference: SD 569,788
- Location: Hutton Roof, Cumbria
- Country: England
- Denomination: Anglican
- Website: St John, Hutton Roof

History
- Status: Parish church
- Dedication: Saint John the Divine
- Consecrated: 9 August 1881

Architecture
- Functional status: Active
- Heritage designation: Grade II
- Designated: 12 February 1962
- Architect: Paley and Austin
- Architectural type: Church
- Style: Gothic Revival
- Groundbreaking: 1880
- Completed: 1881

Specifications
- Materials: Stone with ashlar dressings Slate roof

Administration
- Province: York
- Diocese: Carlisle
- Archdeaconry: Westmorland and Furness
- Deanery: Kendal
- Parish: Kirkby Lonsdale

Clergy
- Rector: Rev Richard John Snow

St John's Church is in the village of Hutton Roof, Cumbria, England. It is an active Anglican parish church in the deanery of Kendal, the archdeaconry of Westmorland and Furness, and the diocese of Carlisle. Its benefice is united with those of seven local parishes, the benefice being entitled Kirkby Lonsdale Team Ministry, and known locally as the Rainbow Parish. The church is recorded in the National Heritage List for England as a designated Grade II listed building.

== History ==
The church was built in 1880–81. The architects were the Lancaster partnership of Paley and Austin. It replaced an earlier chapel built in 1757. The new church cost £2,500 (equivalent to £260,000 as of 2025), The foundation stone was laid on 25 June 1880, and the church was consecrated on 9 August 1881. The vicar of the church between 1913 and 1918 was Rev Theodore Bayley Hardy. As chaplain to the British Army, Hardy was the most decorated non-combatant in the First World War, receiving the Victoria Cross, the Distinguished Service Order, and the Military Cross for the assistance he gave to the wounded.

== Architecture ==
St John's is constructed in stone with ashlar dressings, and has a slate roof. Its architectural style is Perpendicular. Its plan consists of a two-bay nave, a north aisle, a chancel with an organ loft and vestry to the north, and a southwest tower incorporating a porch. The tower has a stair turret on its southwest corner and a buttress at the southeast corner. In its top stage are two-light bell openings with louvres. The parapet is embattled, and on the summit of the tower is a pyramidal roof with a weathervane carrying the date 1881. The entrance to the church is on the south of the tower. Inside the church there is a four-bay arcade. In the vestry are two stones from an earlier church, one dated 1616 and the other 1757. The stained glass in the west window, dated 1880, is by Shrigley and Hunt. Elsewhere there is glass by Heaton, Butler and Bayne.

== See also ==
- Listed buildings in Hutton Roof, South Lakeland
- List of ecclesiastical works by Paley and Austin
