= Listed buildings in Nether Wyresdale =

Nether Wyresdale is a civil parish in the Wyre district of Lancashire, England. It contains 23 listed buildings that are recorded in the National Heritage List for England. All the listed buildings are designated at Grade II, the lowest of the three grades, which is applied to "buildings of national importance and special interest". The parish includes the villages of Scorton, the southern part of the village of Dolphinholme, and the countryside between and around them. Most of the listed buildings are houses, cottages, country houses and associated structures, and farmhouses. Also listed are a medieval cross base, a milestone, bridges, and churches and associated structures.

== Buildings ==
Name and location	Photograph	Date	Notes
Cross base 53.95664°N 2.72579°W	—	Medieval (probable)	The cross base is in sandstone. It consists of a roughly rectangular boulder with a rectangular socket.
Inglenook; 53.93390°N 2.76083°W	—	17th century	A rendered stone house with a steep roof, in one storey with an attic. Most of the windows are modern, and in the roof are two dormers. The doorway has plain reveals. Inside the house is a visible cruck truss and a timber-framed partition.
The Cottage and Grey Eaves; 53.93392°N 2.76038°W	—	17th century	A pair of stone cruck-framed cottages in one storeys with attics. The Cottage, to the right, has a slate roof, two bays, modern windows, and two attic dormers. The original part of Grey Eaves has one bay, a roof of asbestos sheet, and windows with plain reveals. To the left is a 19th-century extension with two storeys and two bays. Inside The Cottage are two cruck trusses.
The Haven; 53.93265°N 2.75993°W		17th century (probable)	A stone house, basically cruck-framed, with a corrugated iron roof, in one storey with an attic. On the left is a wide projecting 20th-century window under a canopy. To the right are two windows and a doorway, all with plain reveals. Inside the house part of a cruck truss is visible.
Stirzaker's Cottage; 53.94650°N 2.75041°W	—	Late 17th century	A sandstone cottage with a thatched roof in one storey with an attic. It has modern windows with a timber dormer in the upper floor. On the front is a modern gabled stone porch. Inside he cottage is a bressumer.
Crosshill Farmhouse; 53.95238°N 2.72294°W	—	Mid 18th century	The farmhouse is in sandstone with a slate roof, and has two storeys and two bays. In the centre is a gabled single-storey porch that has a doorway with plain reveals. The windows are mullioned, and inside the house is a timber-framed wall.
Wyreside Hall, Coach House, and Ice House; 53.96905°N 2.73041°W		18th century	The hall was remodelled by Edmund Sharpe in 1843–34 with the addition of a new west front. The house is in sandstone with slate roofs. The west front has two storeys and is symmetrical with eight bays. It has a plinth and an entablature with Tuscan pilasters between the bays. In the centre is a pediment and a porch with four fluted Ionic columns, an entablature, and a balustrade. The windows are sashes. Behind the main block are service ranges, to the north is a coach house, and in the grounds to the south of the hall is an ice house.
Milestone; 53.96288°N 2.73387°W	—	Late 18th century (probable)	The milestone is in sandstone, and has a rectangular plan with a rounded top. It is inscribed with "7".
Dolphinholme Bridge; 53.97468°N 2.73456°W		1791	The bridge carries Waggon Road over the River Wyre. It is in sandstone, and consists of a single segmental arch. The bridge has alternately projecting voussoirs, a string course below a solid parapet with shaped coping, and there are two pairs of end piers. One of the voussoirs is inscribed with initials and the date.
4, 6, 8 and 10 Wagon Road; 53.97421°N 2.73415°W	—	c. 1800	A row of four sandstone houses with a slate roof in three storeys. Each house has one bay. Some of the windows are horizontal sliding sashes, others are modern. The doors are paired and have stone surrounds.
Derham House and gas lamp 53.97428°N 2.73423°W		c. 1800	The house is in sandstone with a slate roof, and has two storeys and three bays. The windows are sashes. In the centre of the front is a doorcase with two attached Doric columns. On the right return is a three-light window, and on the right corner of the house is a gas lamp on an iron bracket.
Old Mill House; 53.97400°N 2.73386°W		c. 1800	A sandstone house with a slate roof in three storeys and three bays. Most of the windows are sashes. In the left bay is a single-storey bow window with a cornice. The central doorway has a stone surround and a fanlight. In the right gable wall, facing the road, is a tall stair window with three transoms.
Wall, gates, gate piers, and mounting block, Old Mill House; 53.97400°N 2.73358°W	—	c. 1800	All the structures are in sandstone. The wall runs along the north side of the garden. It contains two gateways with moulded surrounds, one with an ogee head, the other with a pointed arch. Between them is a mounting block consisting of a single piece of stone cut into three steps. Further to the left is an opening with two square piers that have pyramidal caps.
Woodcock Hall; 53.97407°N 2.73396°W		c. 1800	The house is in sandstone with a slate roof, and has three storeys and a front of three bays facing the road. The windows are sashes with plain surrounds, The doorway is in the left return and has a plain surround.
13 and 15 Wagon Road; 53.97431°N 2.73390°W	—	Early 19th century	A pair of sandstone houses with a slate roof in two storeys. No. 13 at the left has two bays and sash windows; No. 15 has three bays and modern windows. The doorways and all but one window have plain surrounds, the other window has plain reveals. In the apex of the gable wall of No. 13 is a lunette.
Street Bridge; 53.96363°N 2.73507°W	—	1835	The bridge carries Stoney Lane over the River Wyre. It is in sandstone, and consists of a single elliptical arch. The bridge has chamfered rustication, keystones, a band, and a solid parapet with coping. Above the western keystone are inscribed initials and the date.
Belvedere Farmhouse and Cottage; 53.97172°N 2.72411°W	—	Early to mid 19th century	A house and a cottage at right angles to each other with, in the angle, an octagonal tower with a parapet. They are in sandstone with tile roofs, and have two storeys. The cottage faces south and has two bays and modern windows. The house faces west and has three bays, with mainly sash windows. The doorway has a quoined surround, and on the front of the house is a single-storey gabled porch. The tower also has sash windows and a doorway with a quoined surround.
Springfield; 53.93113°N 2.76079°W	—	Early to mid 19th century	A sandstone house with a slate roof in two storeys, with five bays and chamfered quoins. The windows are sashes with plain surrounds, and the doorway has pilasters and a cornice on brackets.
Methodist Church; 53.93218°N 2.76058°W		1842	The Methodist church is in sandstone with a slate roof and has a single storey. It has a front of three bays with chamfered quoins and a cornice. The windows consist of a lunette above three lights, and they contain a sash window. In the centre of the front is a porch with chamfered rustication, a cornice, and a blocking course with a datestone, and over this is an inscribed plaque. On the gables are finials.
Wyresdale Park; 53.93639°N 2.75087°W		1856–58	This includes a country house in Gothic Revival style by E. G. Paley. It is in sandstone with slate roofs, and among its features are a front with a gabled entrance bay and a three-storey tower. Also as part of the listing are estate buildings and garden features, including a fountain, a workshop, store rooms, a tack room, stables, a garage, a gun room, barns, shippons, and keepers' cottages.
Church of St Mary and St James, with presbytery, wall and gate piers 53.93332°N 2.75837°W		1860–61	The Roman Catholic church and presbytery are by Henry John Hansom and are in sandstone with slate roofs. The church consists of a nave, a north aisle, a southwest porch, and a chancel. On the west gable is a bellcote. The church is joined to the presbytery by a single-storey corridor. The presbytery has two storeys and a basement and a front of three bays. In front of the presbytery are two pairs of gate piers, the outer piers joined to the inner piers by walls, and the inner piers containing wrought iron gates.
St Peter's Church; 53.93116°N 2.75891°W		1878–79	The church, designed by Paley and Austin, is in sandstone with red tile roofs. It consists of a west steeple, a nave and chancel in one cell, a north aisle, and a south porch. The steeple has a tower with angle buttresses, a stair projection, a west window, and a broached shingled spire.
Lychgate, St Peter's Church; 53.93139°N 2.75915°W		1878–79 (probable)	The lychgate is at the northern entrance to the churchyard. It is in oak on a sandstone base and with a red tile roof. There are two tie beams with curved braces, and carved bargeboards.
