= St Peter's Church, Mansergh =

Coordinates: 54.2385°N 2.6115°W

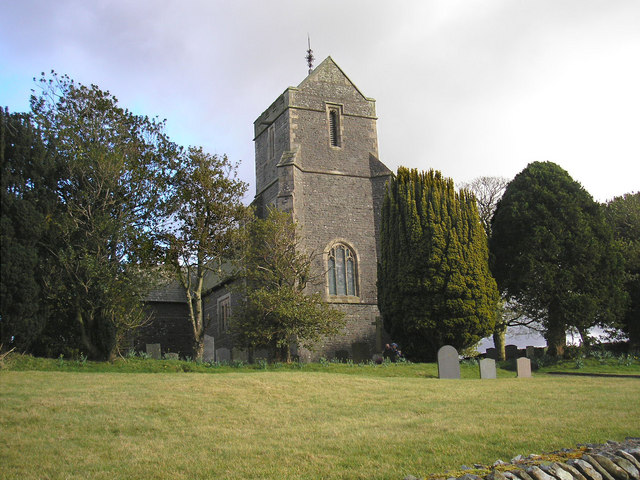
- St Peter's Church, Mansergh, from the west

- Location in Cumbria
- OS grid reference: SD 603,827
- Location: Mansergh, Cumbria
- Country: England
- Denomination: Anglican
- Website: St Peter, Mansergh

History
- Status: Parish church
- Dedication: Saint Peter

Architecture
- Functional status: Active
- Heritage designation: Grade II
- Designated: 21 February 1989
- Architect: Paley and Austin
- Architectural type: Church
- Style: Gothic Revival
- Groundbreaking: 1879
- Completed: 1880

Administration
- Province: York
- Diocese: Carlisle
- Archdeaconry: Westmorland and Furness
- Deanery: Kendal
- Parish: Kirkby Lonsdale

Clergy
- Rector: Revd Richard John Snow

St Peter's Church is in the village of Mansergh, Cumbria, England. It is an active Anglican parish church in the deanery of Kendal, the archdeaconry of Westmorland and Furness, and the diocese of Carlisle. Its benefice is united with those of six local churches to form the Kirkby Lonsdale Team Ministry. The church is recorded in the National Heritage List for England as a designated Grade II listed building.

== History ==
The church was built in 1879–80 to replace a church built in 1726 or 1727 on the same site. It was designed by the Lancaster architects Paley and Austin. The new church provided seating for 148 people at a cost of about £2,000 (equivalent to £210,000 in 2025). The major benefactor was William Wilson of Rigmaden Park, with additional contributions from Trinity College, Cambridge, the Earl of Bective, and the vicar of Kirkby Lonsdale. The porch was added in 1903.

== Architecture ==
=== Exterior ===
St Peter's is constructed in dressed slate with ashlar dressings and slate roofs. The porch is in timber on a stone base. The architectural style is late Perpendicular. The plan of the church consists of a three bay nave with a south porch, a two-bay chancel with a north transept and vestry, and a west tower. The tower has diagonal buttresses, a south stair turret, and a saddleback roof with embattled parapets on the north and south sides. It has a three-light west window, under which is a plaque recording the rebuilding of the church, and incorporating a panel with the date 1726. There is a doorway on the north side of the tower. The windows in the sides of the nave and the chancel are straight-headed; those in the nave have two or three lights, those in the chancel have one or two lights. The east window and the window in the vestry both have four lights; the vestry also has a doorway. The transept consists of two gabled bays, and contains two-light windows.

=== Interior ===
Inside the church are waggon roofs. The font is octagonal, and the pulpit is in timber on a stone base. In the tower is an elaborate Gothic wall memorial to a couple who died in 1845 and 1851 respectively. The stained glass in the west window, dated 1865, is by Lavers, Barraud and Westlake. In a north window is glass by Hardman dated 1878.

== See also ==
- Listed buildings in Mansergh, Cumbria
- List of ecclesiastical works by Paley and Austin
