= All Saints Church, Thorpe Bassett =

Coordinates: 54.1498°N 0.6875°W

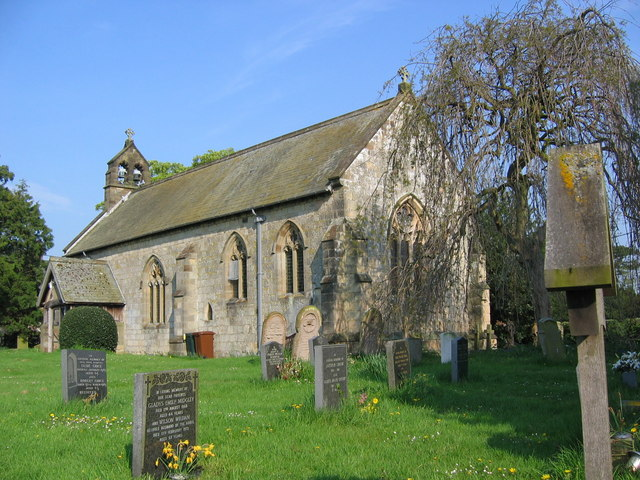
- All Saints Church, Thorpe Bassett, from the south-east

- Location in North Yorkshire
- OS grid reference: SE 858,735
- Location: Thorpe Bassett, North Yorkshire
- Country: England
- Denomination: Anglican
- Website: All Saints, Thorpe Bassett

History
- Status: Parish church

Architecture
- Functional status: Active
- Heritage designation: Grade II*
- Designated: 10 October 1966
- Architect: Paley and Austin (restoration)
- Architectural type: Church
- Style: Norman, Gothic, Gothic Revival

Specifications
- Materials: Limestone, slate roofs

Administration
- Province: York
- Diocese: York
- Archdeaconry: York
- Deanery: Southern Ryedale
- Parish: Thorpe Bassett

Clergy
- Rector: Revd Judith Mary Duke

All Saints Church is in the village of Thorpe Bassett, North Yorkshire, England. It is an active Anglican parish church in the deanery of Southern Ryedale, the archdeaconry of York, and the diocese of York. Its benefice is united with those of five other local churches to form the Benefice of Buckrose Carrs. The church is recorded in the National Heritage List for England as a designated Grade II* listed building.

== History ==
The church dates from the 12th century, and the arcade is from the early 13th century. By the beginning of the 19th century the fabric of the church was in a poor condition, and it was restored in 1878–79 by the Lancaster architects Paley and Austin. This included rebuilding the north aisle on its old foundations, opening up the blocked medieval arcade, rebuilding the chancel, and adding a vestry and a porch. The work cost over £2,000 (equivalent to £210,000 as of 2025).

== Architecture ==
=== Exterior ===
The body of the church is constructed in limestone, the porch is in sandstone and timber, and the roofs are slated. Its plan consists of a three-bay nave with a south porch, a north aisle, and a chancel with a vestry to the north. At the west end is a three-light window containing Perpendicular tracery, and a double bellcote with a gable and a cross finial. The porch leads to a Norman doorway dating from the late 12th century decorated with chevrons. To the east of the porch, in the chancel wall, is a three-light window with Decorated tracery, and a buttress. To the east of the buttress are a small window with a pointed head, and two two-light windows. The east end contains a three-light window with Decorated tracery, and a gable surmounted by a gable with a cross finial.

=== Interior ===
Incorporated in the fabric of the north wall of the nave are carvings, some dating from the 11th century, including a tomb slab. The north wall of the chancel contains 19th-century niche containing the 14th-century effigy of a priest. There is a glass box in the small pointed window in the south wall of the chancel containing a 13th-century corbel head. The font consists of a Norman tub dating from the 12th century on a 19th-century base. Its carved wooden cover was made in 1636. The chancel is floored with Victorian tiles in medieval style. The east window contains fragments of 14th-century glass. The organ was built in 1813 by Henry Bevington for the Verney family of Claydon House, Buckinghamshire. It was later discovered in a poor state of repair in York Minster. The organ was restored in 1977 by Howard Balshaw.

== See also ==
- Grade II* listed buildings in North Yorkshire (district)
- Listed buildings in Thorpe Bassett
- List of ecclesiastical works by Paley and Austin
