= Church of All Souls, Bolton =

Former church in Greater Manchester, England

Coordinates: 53.5937°N 2.4339°W

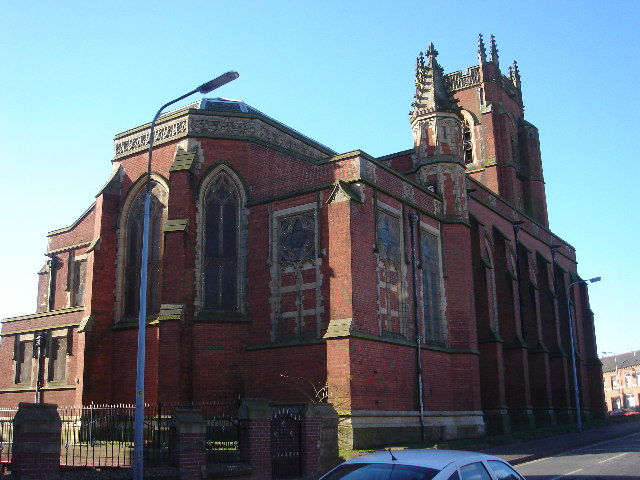
- All Souls Church, Bolton, from the northeast

- Location in Greater Manchester
- OS grid reference: SD 713,108
- Location: Astley St, Astley Bridge, Bolton, Greater Manchester
- Country: England
- Denomination: Anglican
- Website: allsoulsbolton.org.uk

History
- Founder: Thomas Greenhalgh
- Dedication: All Souls
- Consecrated: 1881

Architecture
- Functional status: Redundant
- Heritage designation: Grade II*
- Designated: 26 April 1974
- Architect: Paley and Austin
- Architectural type: Church
- Style: Gothic Revival
- Groundbreaking: 1878
- Completed: 1881
- Construction cost: £16,500 (equivalent to £1,730,000 in 2025)
- Closed: 1986

Specifications
- Materials: Brick with sandstone dressings, slate roofs

The Church of All Souls is a redundant Anglican church on Astley Street in Astley Bridge, a predominantly residential district of Bolton, Greater Manchester, England. Historically in Lancashire, it is recorded in the National Heritage List for England as a Grade II* listed building and was formerly under the care of the Churches Conservation Trust. As of 2014, the church is in use as a business and community centre.

== Early history ==
The church was built between 1878 and 1881 and was paid for by Thomas Greenhalgh, an Evangelical mill-owner. Greenhalgh had inherited the money from his brother Nathaniel, who died in 1877 aged 60. It was one of two churches in the area financed from this inheritance, the other being St Saviour's. The total cost of the church, including fittings, stained glass, the organ, and the boundary walls, was £23,000 (equivalent to £2,420,000 in 2025). The local population had grown during the second half of the 19th century, and the church was intended to serve the people working in the nearby mills. It was designed by the Lancaster architects Paley and Austin. The church was planned to seat a congregation of about 800, giving them all a good view of the proceedings and an opportunity to hear the sermon. The contractors were Cordingley and Stopford of Manchester. The church was consecrated in 1881 by Dr J. Fraser, Bishop of Manchester. Few changes have been made to the building since then. A war memorial was added to commemorate the parishioners who died serving in the First World War.

== Architecture ==
=== Exterior ===
All Souls is constructed in brick with dressings of Longridge sandstone. The interior is dressed with Stourton stone. The roofs are of slate. Its plan consists of a five-bay nave, a two-bay chancel with a canted apse, an organ chamber to the north, a chapel and vestry to the south, and a west tower with a protruding north porch and stair turret. There are no aisles. The tower has four stages. It is 118 feet (36 m) tall. In the lowest stage is a west door, above which is a frieze and a three-light traceried window. The north porch is gabled. The second stage contains a round window. In the third stage are two small windows and a three-light bell opening containing Perpendicular tracery. Around the top of the tower is a traceried parapet with crocketed pinnacles at the corners. The nave is divided into bays by buttresses, and at the corners of the east end are octagonal pinnacles with crocketted caps. In the bays are two tiers of three-light windows with Perpendicular tracery. The windows in the chapels are flat-headed. In the chancel, the windows are arranged in two tiers, with one of four lights and two of two lights. A parapet decorated with a quatrefoil frieze runs round the top of the chancel.

=== Interior ===
The interior is constructed without any pillars, making it a single, undivided space with a span of 52 feet (16 m), one of the widest for a parish church in England. It was built in this way to give the congregation an excellent view of the chancel from the nave and to ensure that the sermon could be heard clearly. At the west end is a small gallery. To provide the wide interior, the timber roof has a complex structure with rib vaulting, carried on octagonal shafts between the windows. On the sides of the chancel are two-bay arcades. The reredos is in stone and consists of traceried panels, the outer ones inscribed with prayers and other text. The reredos and the font were designed by John Roddis of Birmingham. The choir stalls, pews, organ case, altar, communion rails, credence table, and pulpit are in oak and were all designed by the architects. The stained glass in the apse depicts scenes from the New Testament; it was designed by the architects and made by Clayton and Bell. The windows are dedicated to the memory of Thomas Greenhalgh's brother, Nathaniel. The stained glass in the east chancel windows is dated 1887 and depicts Faith and Hope; it was made by Burlison and Grylls. The two-manual organ was built in 1881 by Isaac Abbott of Leeds. There is a ring of eight bells, all cast in 1881 by John Taylor & Co of Loughborough.

== Recent history and present day ==
During the 20th century, the size of the local population declined, and in 1962 the parish was combined with that of St James on Waterloo Road. In 1970 the stained glass windows in the tower were removed. They had depicted the Creation and were made by Shrigley and Hunt, but had been damaged by vandalism. The church closed in 1986 and was vested in the Churches Conservation Trust. The building has since been redeveloped and, in December 2014, opened as a business and community centre managed by a small charity set up for this purpose, known as All Souls Bolton.

== See also ==
- Grade II* listed buildings in Greater Manchester
- List of churches in Greater Manchester
- List of churches preserved by the Churches Conservation Trust in Northern England
- List of ecclesiastical works by Paley and Austin
- Listed buildings in Bolton
