= Christ Church, Ashford =

Coordinates: 51°08′23″N 0°52′11″E

- Location in Kent
- OS grid reference: TR 009,417
- Location: Ashford, Kent
- Country: England
- Denomination: Anglican
- Website: Christ Church, Ashford

History
- Status: Parish church

Architecture
- Functional status: Active
- Heritage designation: Grade II
- Designated: 4 January 1976
- Architect: Hubert Austin
- Architectural type: Church
- Style: Gothic Revival
- Groundbreaking: 1866
- Completed: 1910
- Construction cost: £4,219 (£410,000 in 2025)

Specifications
- Materials: Ragstone with Bath stone dressings Slate roofs

Administration
- Province: Canterbury
- Diocese: Canterbury
- Archdeaconry: Maidstone
- Deanery: Ashford
- Parish: Christ Church, South Ashford

Christ Church is in the town of Ashford, Kent, England. It is an active Anglican parish church in the deanery of Ashford, the archdeaconry of Maidstone, and the diocese of Canterbury. The church is recorded in the National Heritage List for England as a designated Grade II listed building.

== History ==
The church was built to accommodate the growing population of the town in the middle of the 19th century, following the building of the locomotive works for the South Eastern Railway Company. In 1864 a competition was held for its design, which was won by Hubert Austin, a young architect working as an assistant to George Gilbert Scott. It was Austin's first design. In 1867 Austin was to join E. G. Paley in Lancaster, Lancashire, to form the partnership of Paley and Austin. The church was built in 1866–67. Most of the money for its construction was provided by the shareholders of the South Eastern Railway Company, and so it came to be known as "the railwayman's church". The church cost was £4,219 (equivalent to £410,000 in 2025), and its site was donated by G. Jemmett, the lord of the manor at the time. It provided seating for about 600 people. The vestry was added in 1910.

== Architecture ==
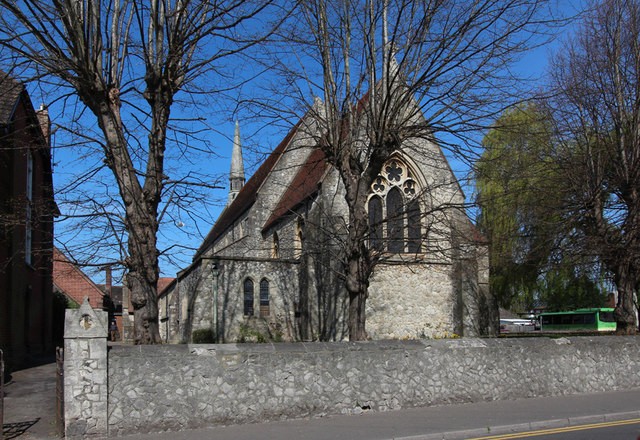

Christ Church is constructed in ragstone and has Bath stone dressings. The roofs are slated. Its plan consists of a five-bay nave with a clerestory, north and south aisles, a south porch, and a chancel with a vestry and an organ chamber to the north. Towards the west end is a bell turret. The windows on the north and south sides are lancets. Those at the east and west ends have Geometric tracery. Inside the church the arcades are carried on round piers. The two-manual organ was built by Bishop and Son in 1897.

== See also ==
- List of ecclesiastical works by Paley and Austin
- Ashford railway works
