= Listed buildings in Hutton Roof, Kirkby Lonsdale =

Hutton Roof is a civil parish in the Westmorland and Furness district of Cumbria, England. It contains ten listed buildings that are recorded in the National Heritage List for England. All the listed buildings are designated at Grade II, the lowest of the three grades, which is applied to "buildings of national importance and special interest". The parish contains the village of Hutton Roof, and is otherwise entirely rural. The listed buildings consist of farmhouses, farm buildings. houses, a church, and a war memorial.

== Buildings ==
Name and location	Photograph	Date	Notes
Glebe Cottage and outbuilding 54.19885°N 2.65985°W	—	Late 17th or early 18th century	The house and attached outbuilding are in stone with quoins, slate roofs, and two storeys. The house has three bays, two rear outshuts, and on the front is an open gabled timber porch. The outbuilding to the left is lower and has two bays, and the windows in both parts are mullioned.
Turner's Farmhouse and barn 54.19813°N 2.65966°W	—	Late 17th or early 18th century	The farmhouse and barn are in stone, the house is roughcast, and they have a slate roof. The house has two storeys and two bays, a central doorway above which is a datestone, and casement windows. The barn to the left has a segmental-headed barn entrance, a smaller entrance and a window, and on the gable is a ball finial.
Yew Tree Farmhouse; 54.19712°N 2.65995°W	—	1720	A stone farmhouse with a slate roof and two storeys. It has a front of two bays, a gabled extension and a conservatory to the left, and at the rear is another gabled extension and an outshut. On the front is a gabled porch containing benches and with a ball finial. The doorway has chamfered jambs and an embattled initialled and dated lintel, and above it is a datestone. Some windows are fire windows and the others are mullioned.
Manor Farm House Farmhouse and outbuilding 54.21059°N 2.68237°W	—	Early 18th century	The farmhouse and outbuilding are in roughcast stone, and they have a slate roof with coped gables. There are two storeys and three bays, the outbuilding forming the left bay, and there is a recessed two-bay extension to the right. The ground floor windows are mullioned, and in the upper floor are sash windows. Above the door is a datestone and a sundial, and the outbuilding has a segmental-headed doorway.
Barn east of Manor Farmhouse; 54.21044°N 2.68181°W	—	1730	A stone barn with a slate roof, five bays, and outshuts on the left and at the rear. Above the entrance is an initialled datestone.
Badger Gate and barns 54.21436°N 2.66789°W	—	1747	The house with barns at the rear are in stone with slate roofs. The house has two storeys, quoins, and three bays, the first bay recessed with a hipped roof. The doorway has an architrave, a frieze and a pediment, and above it is a blind window containing carving. The windows are sashes, and in the right return are pigeon holes. At the rear are barns with outshuts.
Barn north-east of Manor Farmhouse; 54.21079°N 2.68208°W	—	18th century (probable	The barn is in stone and has a slate roof with ball finials on the gables. There are outshuts, a segmental-headed barn entrance, and windows, originally mullioned, but with the mullions now missing.
Mealriggs Farmhouse; 54.18402°N 2.66032°W	—	1819	The farmhouse is in stone with quoins and a slate roof. There are two storeys, three bays, and a small gabled wing to the east. Above the door is a fanlight and a lintel containing an oval dated panel. The windows are sashes.
St John's Church; 54.20308°N 2.66170°W		1880–81	The church was designed by Paley and Austin in Perpendicular style, and is in stone with slate roofs. It consists of a nave, a north aisle, and chancel with a north organ loft and vestry, and a southwest tower. The tower has buttresses, a stair turret rising to a greater height, a top cornice, an embattled parapet, and a pyramidal roof with a weathervane in the form of a pierced date (1881).
War memorial 54.20256°N 2.66144°W		1920	The war memorial is in the southeast corner of the churchyard of St John's Church. It is in limestone, and consists of a natural monolith about 1.8 metres (5 ft 11 in) high which is unworked apart from a cross in relief, beneath which is a smooth area. This area carries an inscription and the names of those lost in the First World War.
