= St Bartholomew's Church, Penn =

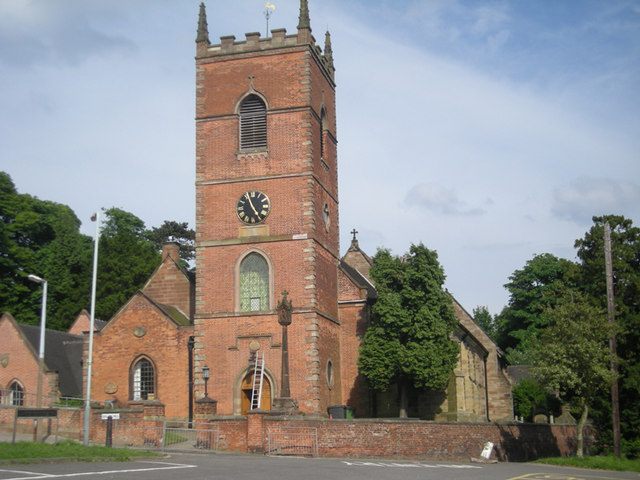
- St Bartholomew's Church, Penn, from the west

- Location in West Midlands
- 52.5553°N 2.1571°W
- OS grid reference: SO895953
- Location: Penn, Wolverhampton, West Midlands
- Country: England
- Denomination: Anglican
- Website: St Bartholomew, Penn

History
- Status: Parish church
- Dedication: Saint Bartholomew

Architecture
- Functional status: Active
- Heritage designation: Grade II*
- Designated: 3 February 1977
- Architect(s): W. Evans (south aisle); Paley and Austin (restoration and additions)
- Architectural type: Church
- Style: Gothic, Gothic Revival

Specifications
- Materials: Stone and brick Tiled roofs

Administration
- Province: Canterbury
- Diocese: Lichfield
- Archdeaconry: Walsall
- Deanery: Trysull
- Parish: Penn, St Bartholomew's Church

Clergy
- Vicar: Revd Prebendary Ben Whitmore

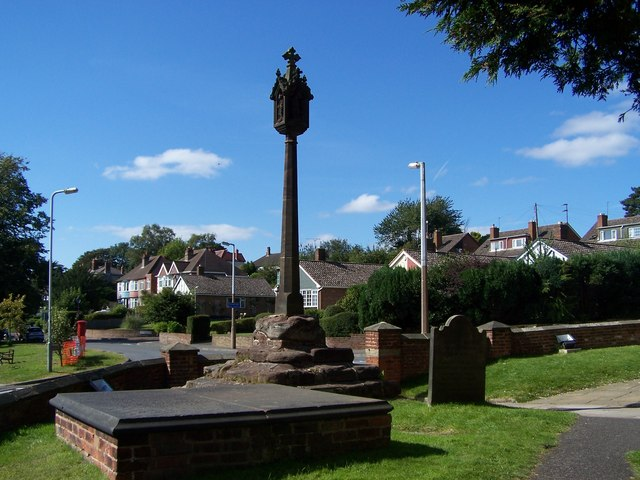
Medieval churchyard cross

St Bartholomew's Church is in Penn, a district of Wolverhampton, West Midlands, England. It is an active Anglican parish church in the deanery of Trysull, the archdeaconry of Walsall, and the diocese of Lichfield. Its benefice is united with that of St Anne, Lower Penn. The church is recorded in the National Heritage List for England as a designated Grade II* listed building.

== History ==
The presence of the base and stem of an Anglo-Saxon churchyard cross, and the circular shape of the churchyard, show that a church was present on the site before the Norman conquest. The next church on the site was built by Sir Hugh de Bushbury in 1200 and was dedicated to Saint John the Baptist. It is not known when the dedication was changed to Saint Bartholomew. The earliest fabric in the present church is part of the north arcade dating from the 14th century. The west part of the arcade and the tower are from the 15th century. The tower was encased in brick in 1765. An annexe was added to the northwest of the church in 1826, and the south aisle was built by W. Evans in 1845. This aisle was too short for the congregation to see the altar, and further alterations were made in 1871–72 by the Lancaster architects Paley and Austin. At this time the incumbent of the church was Revd Francis Henry Paley, the younger brother of E. G. Paley. The alterations made at this time consisted of adding a bay to the east end of the south aisle, extending the nave, and rebuilding the chancel. The organ loft was added in 1901 and a vestry in 1958. The interior of the church was re-ordered in the 1970s, and in 2000 a new wing with modern facilities was added to the north of the church.

== Architecture ==
=== Exterior ===
The church is constructed in ashlar stone and brick, with tiled roofs. The plan consists of a five-bay nave, north and south aisles, an annexe to the west of the north aisle, a three-bay chancel with a vestry to the north and a chapel to the south, and a west tower. The brick-encased tower is in four stages standing on an ashlar plinth, and has quoins at the corners. In the bottom stage is a west doorway, above which is an oval panel, and there is a roundel on the south side. The second stage contains a large west window with a pointed arch. In the third stage is a clock face on the west side above an inscribed panel; on the north and south sides are quatrefoils. The top stage has louvred bell openings. The tower is surmounted by a cornice, an embattled parapet, and pinnacles. The wall of the north aisle contains 19th-century lancet windows, and the head of a blocked round-headed window. Pevsner suggests that this may be Norman. The south aisle has a two-light window with Decorated tracery, and lancets in the south wall. The chancel has a five-light east window and a two-light north window; the chapel has a three-light east window and a two-light south window. The vestry is gabled and has a two-light window. The northwest annexe has a west window above which is an oval panel inscribed with the date 1826.

=== Interior ===
The nave arcades are carried on octagonal piers. At the west end of the church is a gallery that dates from 1765. The chancel is floored with encaustic tiles, whose design is copied from the original medieval tiles. The alabaster reredos has arcades containing mosaics. The wooden pulpit stands on an ashlar base. The octagonal font dates from the 15th century. The wall memorials include one dated 1802 by John Flaxman. The two-manual organ was built in 1974 by Nicholson, which replaced an earlier organ of 1872 by J. W. Walker and Sons. There is a ring of eight bells, all cast in 1929 by Gillett & Johnston.

== External features ==
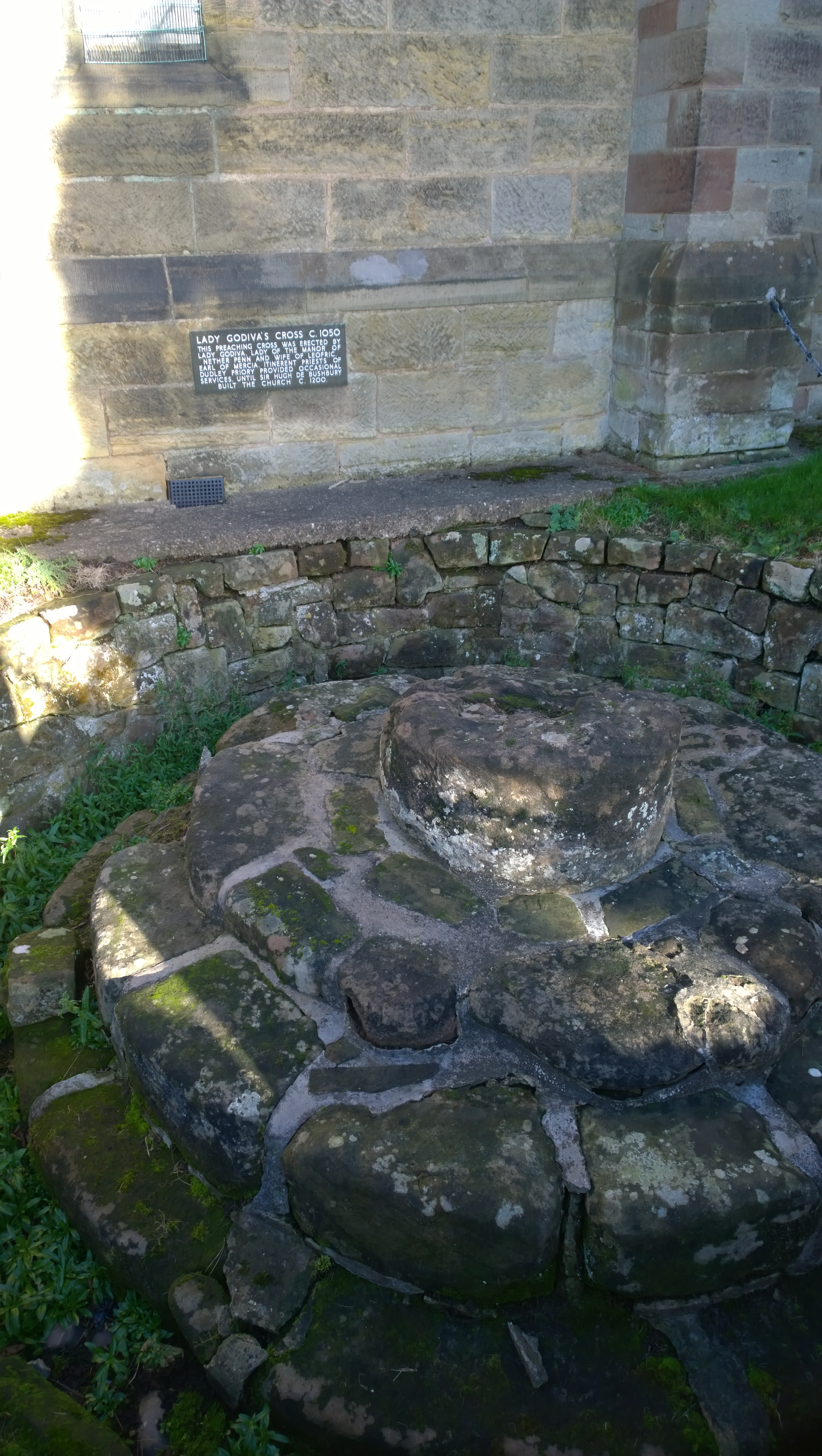
Base of a Saxon Cross at St Bartholomew's Church, Penn at the time owned by Lady Godiva

In the churchyard are the remains of two ancient crosses. One of these, to the south of the church, is known as Lady Godiva's cross. It was rediscovered in 1912 when the other cross, dating from the medieval period, was being restored; the medieval cross was found to be standing on an Anglo-Saxon cross base. The medieval cross has been moved to a different position to the west of the church. It is considered that Lady Godiva's cross was built by Leofric, Earl of Mercia, the husband of Lady Godiva, when he was lord of the manor. All that remains of it consists of three round steps and part of a round shaft. A plaque on the wall of the church states that it was used by the itinerant priests of Dudley Priory. It is designated as a Grade II listed building and a scheduled monument. The medieval cross is also listed at Grade II and is a scheduled monument. It is constructed in sandstone, and consists of three steps, a socket stone, and a shaft. The carved head was added in the 20th century.

There are four further items associated with the church that are listed at Grade II. Against the west wall of the annexe is a carved headstone dated 1700. Another headstone dated 1711 is to the southeast of the church. The churchyard walls and the gate piers to the west of the church, and those to the south and southwest of the church, are listed separately at Grade II.

== See also ==
- List of ecclesiastical works by Paley and Austin
