= St James' Church, Broughton =

Coordinates: 53.5054°N 2.2521°W

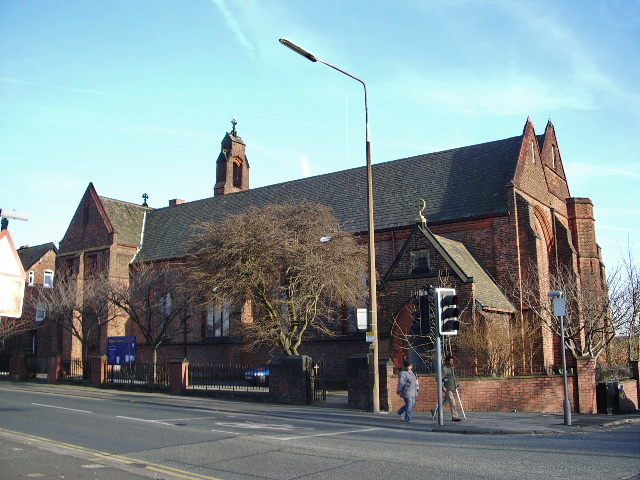
- St James' Church, Broughton, from the northwest

- Location in Greater Manchester
- OS grid reference: SD 83376 00995
- Location: Great Cheetham Street East, Broughton, Greater Manchester
- Country: England
- Denomination: Anglican
- Website: St James, Broughton

History
- Status: Parish church

Architecture
- Functional status: Active
- Architect: Paley and Austin
- Architectural type: Church
- Style: Gothic Revival
- Completed: 1879

Administration
- Diocese: Manchester
- Archdeaconry: Salford
- Deanery: Salford
- Parish: St James Hope

Clergy
- Rector: Revd Christine Threlfall

St James' Church is in Great Cheetham Street East, Broughton, Greater Manchester, England. It is an active Anglican parish church, in the deanery of Salford, the archdeaconry of Salford, and the diocese of Manchester. Its benefice has been combined with those of St John the Evangelist, Broughton, and St Clement with St Matthias, Lower Broughton.

== History ==
The church was built between 1877 and 1879. It was designed by the Lancaster architects Paley and Austin at an estimated cost of £7,000 (equivalent to £910,000 in 2025). Samuel Clowes gave the site, and paid £2,800 towards its cost. As built, it seated 600 people. In about 1970 the north aisle was subdivided from the nave.

== Architecture ==
St James' Church is constructed in brick, and it has brick tracery in its windows. It has a tall bellcote at the east end of the nave. The nave windows have pointed arches, while those in the chancel have flat heads. The other features of the church include sheer gables and large buttresses. The authors of the Buildings of England series comment that "it is a good building, but not outstanding, as Paley & Austin's can be".

== See also ==
- List of ecclesiastical works by Paley and Austin
