= Listed buildings in Thorpe Bassett =

Thorpe Bassett is a civil parish in the county of North Yorkshire, England. It contains eight listed buildings that are recorded in the National Heritage List for England. Of these, one is listed at Grade II*, the middle of the three grades, and the others are at Grade II, the lowest grade. The parish contains the village of Thorpe Bassett and the surrounding area. All the listed buildings are in the village, and consist of a church, a dovecote, houses, farmhouses and associated structures.

== Key ==
Grade	Criteria
II*	Particularly important buildings of more than special interest
II	Buildings of national importance and special interest

== Buildings ==
Name and location	Photograph	Date	Notes	Grade
All Saints Church; 54.14979°N 0.68757°W		12th century	The church has been altered and extended through the centuries, with alterations and a restoration in 1879–80 by Paley and Austin. It is built in limestone, the porch is in sandstone and timber, and the roof is slated. The church consists of a nave, a north aisle, a south porch, a chancel and a vestry. At the west end is a three-light Perpendicular window, and a bellcote with a coped gable and a cross. The south doorway is Norman, with a round arch, one order of shafts, a scalloped and leaf capital, and zigzag decoration.	II*
Dovecote; 54.14952°N 0.68705°W		Late 17th century	The dovecote to the south of the church, later used for other purposes, is in red and vitrified brick with overhanging timber eaves and a pyramidal pantile roof. There is a square plan, it contains a low round-arched doorway under a band, and on the roof is a rebuilt glover.	II
Park House Farmhouse; 54.14758°N 0.68399°W	—	Early 18th century	The farmhouse is in pink-red and red brick, with a stepped and dentilled eaves course, and pantile roofs with a coped gable and shaped kneelers. There are two storeys and an irregular plan. The garden front has two bays, a cross-gable on the right and a range to the left. In the centre is a gabled trellis porch and a doorway with a fanlight. To the left is a canted bay window. Most of the windows are sashes with keystones, and there are horizontally sliding sashes. The ground floor openings have segmental arches.	II
Lilac Tree House; 54.14647°N 0.68197°W	—	Mid-18th century	The house is in rendered and colourwashed brick, with a floor band, dentilled eaves and a pantile roof with shaped kneelers and coped gables. There are two storeys, three bays, and a rear extension. The central doorway has a divided fanlight, the windows are sashes, and all the openings have keystones.	II
Mill Cottage; 54.14652°N 0.67986°W	—	Mid-18th century	A house, with an outbuilding later incorporated into the house, in red brick with a stepped eaves course, and a pantile roof. There are two low storeys and four bays. In the centre is a trellis porch with a shaped gable, and the windows are horizontally sliding sashes.	II
Holly Tree House; 54.15029°N 0.68427°W	—	Late 18th century	The house is in red brick with a pantile roof. There are two storeys and three bays. In the centre is a gabled trellis porch, the windows are horizontally sliding sashes, and all the openings have segmental arches.	II
Wold View, railings and gate 54.14589°N 0.68196°W	—	Early 19th century	The house is in limestone on a plinth, with quoins, a brick eaves course, and a pantile roof with coped gables and shaped kneelers. There are two storeys, three bays, and a rear wing. The doorway is in the centre, the windows are sashes, and all the openings have cambered heads. In front of the house are plain railings and a garden gate.	II
Millbank House; 54.14573°N 0.67910°W	—	Early to mid-19th century	The farmhouse is in variegated brick with a hipped slate roof. There are two storeys, a double depth plan and three bays. The doorway is in the centre, the windows are sashes, and all the openings have segmental arches.	II
