= St Michael's Church, Grimsargh =

Coordinates: 53.7991°N 2.6356°W

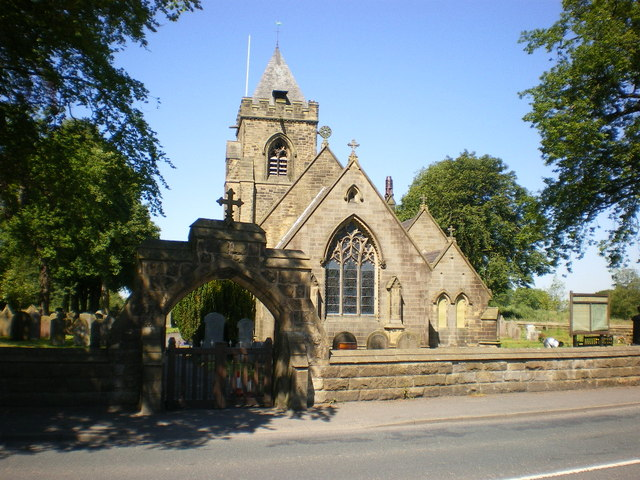
- St Michael's Church from the east

- Location in the City of Preston district
- OS grid reference: SD 582,338
- Location: Grimsargh, Lancashire
- Country: England
- Denomination: Anglican
- Website: St Michael, Grimsargh

History
- Status: Parish church

Architecture
- Functional status: Active
- Heritage designation: Grade II
- Designated: 11 November 1966
- Architect: Paley and Austin
- Architectural type: Church
- Style: Gothic Revival

Administration
- Province: York
- Diocese: Blackburn
- Archdeaconry: Preston
- Deanery: Grimsargh
- Parish: St Michael Grimsargh

St Michael's Church is in the village of Grimsargh, Lancashire, England. It is an active Anglican parish church in the deanery of Grimsargh, the archdeaconry of Preston, and the diocese of Blackburn. The church is recorded in the National Heritage List for England as a designated Grade II listed building.

== History ==
A chapel was built on the site of the present church in 1716, and a north aisle and a chancel were added in 1840. Between 1868 and 1871 the Lancaster architects Paley and Austin carried out work on the church. They rebuilt the nave, providing seating for 220 people, and added a tower. This cost £3,000 (equivalent to £290,000 in 2025), and was paid for by the Revd John Cross.

== Architecture ==
=== Exterior ===
The church is constructed in sandstone and has slate roofs. Its plan consists of a five-bay nave with a north aisle, a single-bay chancel, a north vestry, and a west tower. The architectural style is Decorated. The tower is in three stages, with a stair turret to the southeast and angle buttresses. In the top stage are three-light bell openings, and the tower is surmounted by a battlemented parapet and a pyramidal roof. Along the south side of the church are two-light windows and a gabled porch. The east window has three lights. In the wall of the north aisle are two-light square-headed windows. The vestry has a north doorway, and there are two windows in the east wall.

=== Interior ===
Internally, the arcade is carried on octagonal piers. The nave has a barrel roof. In the chancel there are two sedilia with trefoil heads. The church contains two fonts. One of these consists of an octagonal bowl on a fluted base, dating possibly from the 18th century; the other is a 19th-century tub. The stained glass in the east window dates from 1954 and is by Shrigley and Hunt.

== External features ==
The churchyard contains the war graves of three soldiers and a Royal Air Force officer of World War I. and a Royal Air Force Sergeant of World War II.

== See also ==
- Listed buildings in Grimsargh
- List of ecclesiastical works by Paley and Austin
