= St Saviour's Church, Astley Bridge =

Former church in Bolton, Greater Manchester, England

Coordinates: 53.571558°N 2.449281°W

St Saviour's Church was an Anglican parish church in Deane Road, Deane Bolton, Greater Manchester, England.

== History ==
St Saviour's was built between 1882 and 1885. It cost about £20,000 (equivalent to £2,730,000 in 2023), and was paid for by Thomas Greenhalgh, an Evangelical mill-owner. Thomas inherited the money from his brother Nathaniel, who had died in 1877, aged 60. It was one of two churches in the area financed from this inheritance, the other being All Souls Church. Both churches were designed by the Lancaster architects Paley and Austin. St Saviour's was demolished in 1975.

== Architecture ==
The church was faced in red brick with Longridge stone dressings. It had a west tower with a stepped pierced parapet, and pinnacles rising to a height of 137 feet (42 m). The nave was 86 feet (26 m) long and 50 feet (15 m) wide, in five bays with large transepts on the sides of the eastern bay. The transepts led to aisles on the north and south sides of the chancel. The church provided seating for 804 people. It had a seven-light east window containing stained glass by Burlison and Grylls, and a west window with glass by Shrigley and Hunt. The architectural historian Nikolaus Pevsner referred to the church as "one of their [Paley and Austin's] noblest churches".

== Bells ==
The church had a ring of eight bells cast in 1885 by John Taylor of Loughborough. After the closure of the church the bells were transferred to the Church of St Peter (commonly known as Bolton Parish Church) where they form the back eight of a ring of twelve. Between 1890 and 1970 there were fifty peals rung on the bells.

== See also ==
- List of ecclesiastical works by Paley and Austin
