= St Barnabas' Church, Darwen =

Coordinates: 53.6817°N 2.4584°W

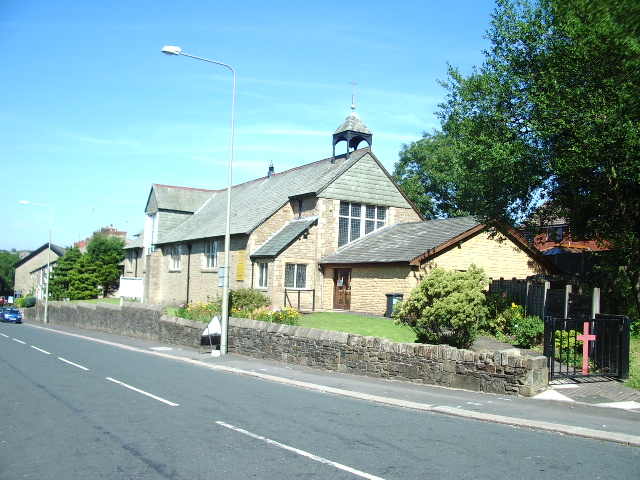
- St Barnabas' Church, Darwen

- Location in Blackburn with Darwen
- OS grid reference: SD 69819 20678
- Location: Darwen, Lancashire
- Country: England
- Denomination: Anglican
- Website: St Barnabas, Darwen

History
- Status: Parish church
- Dedication: Saint Barnabas

Architecture
- Functional status: Active
- Architect: Paley and Austin
- Architectural type: Church
- Completed: 1884

Specifications
- Materials: Stone, Westmorland slate roof

Administration
- Province: York
- Diocese: Blackburn
- Archdeaconry: Blackburn
- Deanery: Blackburn with Darwen
- Parish: St Barnabas, Darwen

Clergy
- Priest: Revd David Bacon

St Barnabas' Church is on Watery Lane, Darwen, Lancashire, England. It is an active Anglican parish church in the deanery of Blackburn with Darwen, the archdeaconry of Blackburn, and the diocese of Blackburn. Its benefice is united with that of St Mary, Grimehills.

The church was built in 1884 as a mission church, and designed by the Lancaster partnership of Paley and Austin. It cost £1,462 (equivalent to £160,000 in 2025), and provided seating for 360 people. It is constructed in stone, with a Westmorland slate roof. On the church is a bellcote with a pyramidal slated roof. Its windows are square-headed. The church contains stained glass windows dating from 1963 by Shrigley and Hunt.

== See also ==
- List of ecclesiastical works by Paley and Austin
