= Listed buildings in Grimsargh =

Grimsargh is a civil parish in the City of Preston, Lancashire, England. It contains six listed buildings that are recorded in the National Heritage List for England. All of the listed buildings are designated at Grade II, the lowest of the three grades, which is applied to "buildings of national importance and special interest". The parish contains the village of Grimsargh and surrounding countryside. Four of the listed buildings are houses or farmhouses, and the others are a church, and a war memorial standing on a plinth dating possibly from the medieval era.

== Buildings ==
| Name and location | Photograph | Date | Notes |
|---|---|---|---|
| War Memorial; 53.79540°N 2.63498°W | | Medieval (possible) | The memorial is in sandstone and stands on a plinth that may date from the medieval era. It was restored following the First World War as a war memorial. On the plinth is a cross with an inscribed metal plate. |
| Place House Farmhouse; 53.78599°N 2.61311°W | — | Late 17th century (probable) | The farmhouse is in brick on a rendered plinth with quoins and a slate roof. There are two storeys and two bays, and at the rear is a two-storey outshut and a single-storey extension. Most of the windows are 19th-century sashes. Inside the house is an inglenook and a bressumer. |
| St Michael's Church; 53.79911°N 2.63543°W | | 1716 | Originally a chapel that was extended in 1868 by E. G. Paley who rebuilt the nave and added a tower. It is in sandstone with slate roofs, and consists of a nave, a north aisle, a chancel, a northeast vestry, and a west tower. The tower is in three stages, and has a southeast stair turret, angle buttresses, an embattled parapet, and a pyramidal roof. |
| Dixon's Farmhouse; 53.80966°N 2.63183°W | — | 1736 | A roughcast farmhouse with a slate roof in two storeys with an attic. There are two bays and a large extension at the rear. The doorway has an architrave with panelled pilasters, a plain frieze, and a moulded segmental pediment, and above it is a datestone. The windows are modern casements. |
| Elston Cottage; 53.78767°N 2.60806°W | — | 18th century | A sandstone house with quoins and a roof of slate at the front and stone-slate at the rear. It has two storeys and two bays. The central doorway has been converted into a window, and the other windows are mullioned. |
| Grimsargh Hall; 53.79664°N 2.62927°W | — | 1773 | A farmhouse in sandstone with quoins and a slate roof in two storeys with an attic. There are two bays with a set-back extension on the right. On the front is a shallow porch with a doorway older than the rest of the house that has decorative strap hinges and many studs. Above the doorway is a datestone, and most of the windows are mullioned. On the extension is a flight of steps leading to a first floor doorway. |
