= St Peter's Church, Scorton =

Coordinates: 53.9312°N 2.7589°W

- St Peter's Church, Scorton, from the south

- Location in the Borough of Wyre
- OS grid reference: SD 503 486
- Location: Scorton, Lancashire
- Country: England
- Denomination: Anglican
- Website: St Peter, Scorton

History
- Status: Parish church
- Dedication: Saint Peter

Architecture
- Functional status: Active
- Heritage designation: Grade II
- Designated: 9 January 1986
- Architect: Paley and Austin
- Architectural type: Church
- Style: Gothic Revival
- Groundbreaking: 1878
- Completed: 1879
- Construction cost: £14,000

Specifications
- Materials: Sandstone, tiled roofs Shingled spire

Administration
- Province: York
- Diocese: Blackburn
- Archdeaconry: Lancaster
- Deanery: Garstang
- Parish: Scorton and Barnacre and Calder Vale

Clergy
- Priest: Revd Anton Muller

St Peter's Church is in the village of Scorton, Lancashire, England. It is an active Anglican parish church in the deanery of Garstang, the archdeaconry of Lancaster and the diocese of Blackburn. Its benefice is united with those of All Saints, Barnacre, and St John the Evangelist, Calder Vale. The church is recorded in the National Heritage List for England as a designated Grade II listed building. Its spire is a landmark near the M6 motorway.

== History ==
The church was built in 1878–79 for the Ormrod family of Bolton and Wyresdale Hall. The architects were Paley and Austin of Lancaster, and the church cost £14,000 (equivalent to £1,500,000 as of 2025). It provided seating for 250 people.

In the late 1950s, it had a special family grave set up by local man James Metcalfe, for his family. The graves are grouped together to the right of the entrance to the church, and are dedicated to both the Metcalfe and the Farnworth family.

== Architecture ==
=== Exterior ===
St Peter's is constructed in sandstone rubble, with tiled roofs and a shingled spire. Its plan consists of a nave and a chancel under a continuous roof, a north aisle, a south porch, and a west tower surmounted by a broach spire. The tower has diagonal buttresses, a stair projection on the south side, a doorway on the north side, and a three-light west window with a pointed head. The bell openings have two lights, other than that on the south, which has a single light, and all are flat-headed. All the windows have pointed heads. Along the north aisle are three windows, one with three lights and two with two lights. The west window has two lights. On the south side of the church are five three-light windows. The east window has five lights.

=== Interior ===
Inside the church the arcade between the nave and the north aisle has three-bays, the arches being carried on octagonal piers. The ceiling of the tower entrance to the church is decorated with Tudor roses, and with a frieze inscribed with words from Psalm 122. In the chancel is a twin sedilia under trefoil heads, and a piscina. The reredos is carved and gilded. The stained glass in the east window dates from about 1879, and is by Burlison and Grylls. It depicts Saint Peter and the Transfiguration of Jesus. The two-manual organ was built in 1879 by John Nicholson, rebuilt in 1973 by Rushworth and Dreaper, and restored in 2009 by David Wells. It was awarded a Historic Organ Certificate in 2008. There is a ring of eight bells, all of which were cast in 1879 by John Warner & Sons.

== External features ==
On the north side of the church is a lychgate dating from the same time as the church, and probably designed by the same architects as the church. It is constructed in oak on a sandstone base, and has a red tiled roof. It is listed at Grade II. The lych gate was renovated in 1988.

== See also ==
- Listed buildings in Nether Wyresdale
- List of ecclesiastical works by Paley and Austin
