= Nether Wyresdale =

Civil parish in Lancashire, England

Coordinates: 53.9505°N 2.7269°W

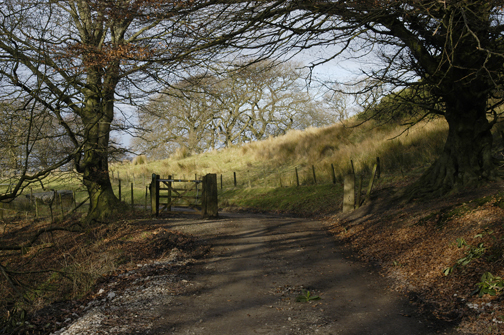
- Road through Holme Wood

- Shown within Wyre Borough Location within Lancashire
- Population: 655 (2011 Census)
- Civil parish: Nether Wyresdale
- District: Wyre
- Shire county: Lancashire
- Region: North West
- Country: England
- Sovereign state: United Kingdom
- Post town: LANCASTER
- Postcode district: LA2
- Dialling code: 01524
- Police: Lancashire
- Fire: Lancashire
- Ambulance: North West
- UK Parliament: Lancaster and Fleetwood

Nether Wyresdale is a civil parish in Lancashire, England. In the 2001 United Kingdom census, it had a population of 613, rising to 655 at the 2011 census.

== History ==
Along with Over Wyresdale, Nether Wyresdale probably formed part of the manor of Wyresdale in the 12th century. Historically, the village formed part of Garstang Rural District and the ecclesiastical parish of Garstang.

== Governance ==
Nether Wyresdale is in the non-metropolitan district of Wyre, in the parliamentary constituency of Lancaster and Fleetwood and is represented at parliament by Labour MP Cat Smith. Prior to Brexit in 2020 it was part of European Parliament constituency of North West England. The village is in the electoral ward called Wyresdale. This ward has a total population taken at the 2011 census of 2,035.

== Geography ==
Nether Wyresdale is approximately 8 miles (13 km) south of Lancaster and approximately 16 miles (26 km) north of Preston. It is situated between the River Wyre and Grizedale Brook. It includes the village of Scorton, the hamlet of Street, and part of the village of Dolphinholme.

== Church ==
The parish church of St Peter (located in Scorton) was built 1878–79 to a design by Lancaster architects Paley and Austin. It is a Grade II listed building.

There is also a Catholic church and a Methodist chapel in Scorton.

== Notable people ==
- James Baines (1648–1717), draper and philanthropist, born at Berkenhead Farm in Nether Wyresdale
- Richard Jackson (1783–1846), Quaker minister

== See also ==
- Listed buildings in Nether Wyresdale
