= Mansergh, Cumbria =

Village and civil parish in Cumbria, England

Coordinates: 54.238°N 2.612°W

Mansergh
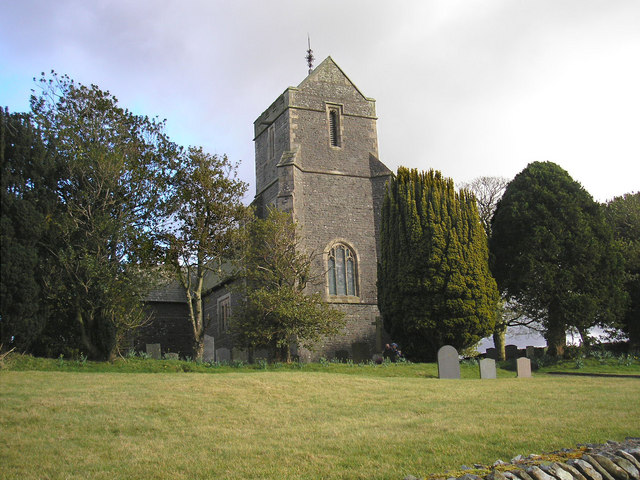
- St Peter's Church

- Location in South Lakeland Location within Cumbria
- Population: 124 (2011)
- OS grid reference: SD6082
- Civil parish: Mansergh
- Unitary authority: Westmorland and Furness
- Ceremonial county: Cumbria
- Region: North West
- Country: England
- Sovereign state: United Kingdom
- Post town: CARNFORTH
- Postcode district: LA6
- Dialling code: 01524
- Police: Cumbria
- Fire: Cumbria
- Ambulance: North West
- UK Parliament: Westmorland and Lonsdale

Mansergh is a village and civil parish in the Westmorland and Furness district of the ceremonial county of Cumbria, England. It includes the village of Mansergh and the hamlet of Old Town, and is located 3.3 miles (5.3 km) north of Kirkby Lonsdale, 9.8 miles (15.8 km) south east of Kendal and 53.2 miles (85.6 km) south of Carlisle. In the 2001 census the parish had a population of 141, decreasing at the 2011 census to 124.

St Peter's Parish Church was built in 1880, and is Grade II listed.

== See also ==
- Listed buildings in Mansergh, Cumbria
