= Thorpe Bassett =

Village and civil parish in North Yorkshire, England

Coordinates: 54.14902°N 0.68605°W

- Location within North Yorkshire
- Population: 105 (2011 census)
- OS grid reference: SE859733
- Unitary authority: North Yorkshire
- Ceremonial county: North Yorkshire
- Region: Yorkshire and the Humber
- Country: England
- Sovereign state: United Kingdom
- Post town: MALTON
- Postcode district: YO17
- Police: North Yorkshire
- Fire: North Yorkshire
- Ambulance: Yorkshire
- UK Parliament: Thirsk and Malton

Thorpe Bassett is a village and civil parish in North Yorkshire, England. It is located between York and Scarborough in the North East of England. Surrounded by farmland the small village is home to 105 residents at the 2011 census. An increase of 4 since the 2001 census.

It was historically part of the East Riding of Yorkshire until 1974 and then part of the Ryedale district from 1974 until 2023. It is now administered by the unitary North Yorkshire Council.

The name Thorpe derives from the Old Norse þorp meaning 'secondary settlement'. The suffix Bassett derives from William Basset, who held the village in 1204.

In the 18th century there were just 17 families living in the village. The main source of employment was agriculture, with the majority of residents working on farms. There was also a School, Post office and public house, all which have now closed. The school building is still standing but the Royal Oak Inn is long gone. The school was restored and converted into one larger house over a 10-year period by Jim and Sue Mortimer, assisted by Gordon Bradshaw (local joiner). This was 1981–1991. Formerly it had been a small cottage at the north gable with the larger portion being two classrooms. Whilst its use changed, it retained most of its external features. The concrete cat on the NE gable ridge, was placed there by J.M. In 1987 and resides there to this day. The water pump in the northern corner garden was placed earlier (1985), also by J.M., set in a large concrete block, to avoid unlawful removal.

In 1835 Lewis's Topographical Dictionary of England description of Thorpe Bassett was:

"THORPE BASSETT, a parish in the wapentake of BUCKROSE, East riding of the county of YORK, 5 miles N.E. from NewMalton, containing 156 inhabitants. The living is a rectory, in the archdeaconry of the East riding, and diocese of York, rated in the king's books at £12, and in the joint patronage of Earl Fitzwilliam and -Watson, Esq. The church is dedicated to All Saints. Ten boys are instructed for the dividends arising from £200, the gift of the Rev. James Graves, in 1804."

In the 1870–72 John Marius Wilson's Imperial Gazetteer of England and Wales described Thorpe Bassett as:

THORPE-BASSETT, a parish in the district of Mal ton and E. R. Yorkshire; 2½ miles SSE of Rillington-Junction r. station, and 4½ E by N of New Malton. Post town, New Malton. Acres, 1,792. Real property, £2,906. Pop., 219. Houses, 42. The living is a rectory in the diocese of York. Value, £328.* Patron, Earl Fitzwilliam. The church is Norman.

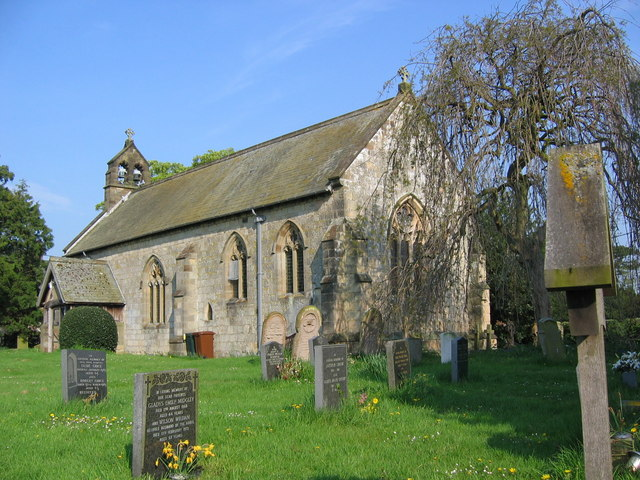
All Saints Church, Thorpe Bassett

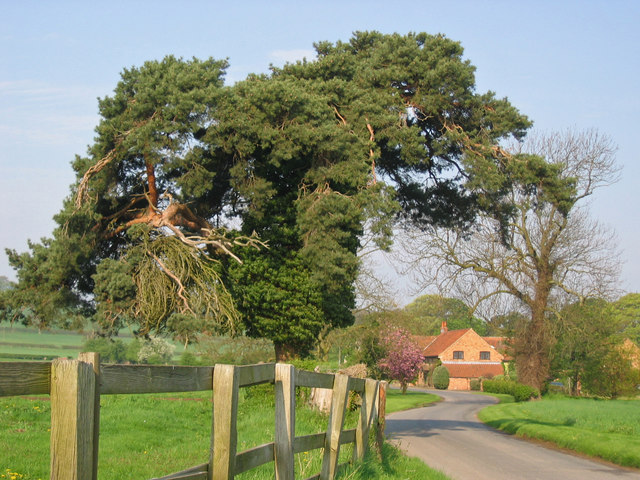
Thorpe Bassett

In 1892 Bulmer's History and Directory of East Yorkshire described Thorpe Bassett with the following:

Thorpe Bassett is a small parish and township containing 1,806 acres, belonging chiefly to Lady Cholmley, of Scarborough, who is also the owner of all the manorial rights. W. H. St. Quintin, Esq., of Scampston, has some land in the parish. The rateable value is £2,478, and the population in 1891 was 180. The soil is clay and sand on the low ground, and flint on the Wolds, the subsoil clay, sand, and chalk; the chief productions are wheat, barley, oats, and turnips.

In 1974 Timothy J. Owston of York described the village:

Situated off the A64 between Scarborough and Malton, close to the villages of Rillington and Wintringham.

The village is agricultural and was once bigger than the small number of houses and farms which exist now. Enclosures were made in the 18th century and there were only 17 families in the village in 1843. Very agricultural, the village is now without a public house, school or Post Office. The last Post Office was run by Mrs Mary Grayson and her husband the postman Mr George Grayson. The school building still survives. The Royal Oak Inn has long gone.

The church is that of All Saints. It has Norman architecture in part but is mainly a result of restoration in 1879–1880. There is a large Rectory Building, seemingly out of scale with the rest of the buildings, but built in 1860 as a typical Victorian semi-gentry home for the Rectors of the time.

Many acres were bought by Sir George Chumley of Wintringham in the last century which added to the landholdings in nearby Wintringham and the estate is still owned by the family today.

== All Saints' Church ==
The parish of Thorpe Bassett is in the wapentake of Buckrose. The church is a rectory, dedicated to All Saints, in the deanery of Buckrose. The church was built in the 12th century and then extensively restored in the late 1870s by Lancaster architects Paley and Austin. The church features a war memorial to those from the village who died fighting in the First World War. A total of 5 men were killed from Thorpe Bassett. The inscription on the memorial reads:

Through Death to Life

To the Glory of God and
Affectionate memory of the
men from Thorpe Bassett who
died for their Country in the
Great War 1914–1919
Christopher Grice
Harold Grice
John Robert Grice
George Watson
George Francis Cholmley
This tablet is placed here as a
memorial to their honour and
as a token of our gratitude.

At a later date an additional inscription was added at the foot of the above inscription. It reads:

George Francis Cholmley, owner of the

Thorpe Bassett Estate, was killed while
in command of the submarine E5. Torpedoed
by the Germans Oct 18th 1914 R.I.P.

John Robert Grice, born to Richard and Lois Grice in Thorpe Bassett was married to Clara Elizabeth Grice from Hull. He was a private in the Durham Light Infantry 2nd/6th Bn and died on 26 October 1919 at the age of 36. He is buried in the graveyard of All Saints Church, Thorpe Bassett.

Harold Grice, born to John and Maria Grice was an Ordinary Seaman who served in the royal navy. He died on 10 February 1916 and is buried in the graveyard of All Saints Church, Thorpe Bassett. Christopher Grice, brother of Harold and a lance corporal in the East Yorkshire Regiment, was killed in action on 9 April 1917 and is buried at Cojeul British Cemetery, France.

George Francis Cholmley, born to Alfred and Anne Cholmley was married to Violet Cholmley and lived in Thorpe Bassett. He was the owner of the Thorpe Bassett Estate. He was a Lieutenant Commander of the Royal Navy and was killed in command of the "E5" submarine by a German torpedo on 18 October 1916. He is named on the Portsmouth Naval Memorial in Portsmouth, Hampshire.

George Watson from Thorpe Bassett also served in the First World War. Details Unknown.

== Population ==
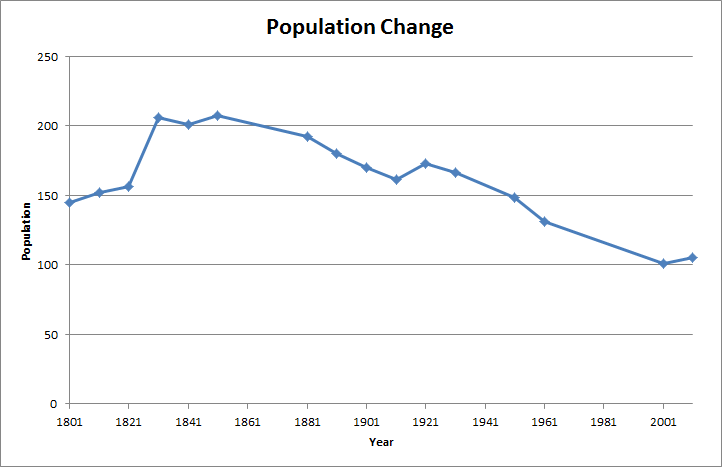
A graph displaying the change in population in Thorpe Basset from 1801 to 2011 according to census data

The population of Thorpe Basset has decreased over the last 200 years. In 1801 at the time of the census the population was 145. This increased to 207 by 1851 but since then has dropped down to just 105 in the 2011 census.

== Domesday Book ==
Thorpe Bassett was listed in the Domesday Book compiled for William the Conqueror in 1086. In 1066 the Lords of Thorpe Bassett were the Normals Cnut and Gamal, Sons of Karli, and Ulfkil and the property was valued at £1. It was assessed to have 3 units of ploughlands and 5 taxable geld units. Thorpe Bassett was taken over after the conquest in 1086 by William the conqueror who was also the tenant in chief.

== See also ==
- Listed buildings in Thorpe Bassett
