= St Andrew's Church, Blackburn =

Church in Lancashire, England

Coordinates: 53.7284°N 2.5012°W

St Andrew's Church is in Livesey Branch Road, Blackburn, Lancashire, England. It is a redundant Anglican church designed by the Lancaster architect E. G. Paley. The foundation stone was laid in December 1866, but the church was not consecrated until 1877. As first built, the church seated 652, and cost £6,000 (equivalent to £710,000 in 2023). Its plan is cruciform, consisting of a nave, north and south transepts, and a chancel with a polygonal apse. There is an incomplete tower in the angle between the south transept and the chancel. Along the sides of the church are paired lancet windows, the transepts contain rose windows, and the windows at the west and east ends of the church incorporate Geometrical tracery. The stained glass in the south wall of the chancel is by Clayton and Bell, and dates from about 1890.

The church was declared redundant on 6 August 2008 and was approved for civic, cultural or community use on 13 August 2009. In 2010 there were plans to convert it into a 35-room care home for the elderly. As of 2014 the church is being refurbished into a care home. It is known as Andrews Court Care Home. Although most of the exterior remains the same there are noticeable alterations. The doorway arches have been lowered to accommodate additional windows to the upper floor.

== See also ==
- List of ecclesiastical works by E. G. Paley
