= Wyresdale Park =

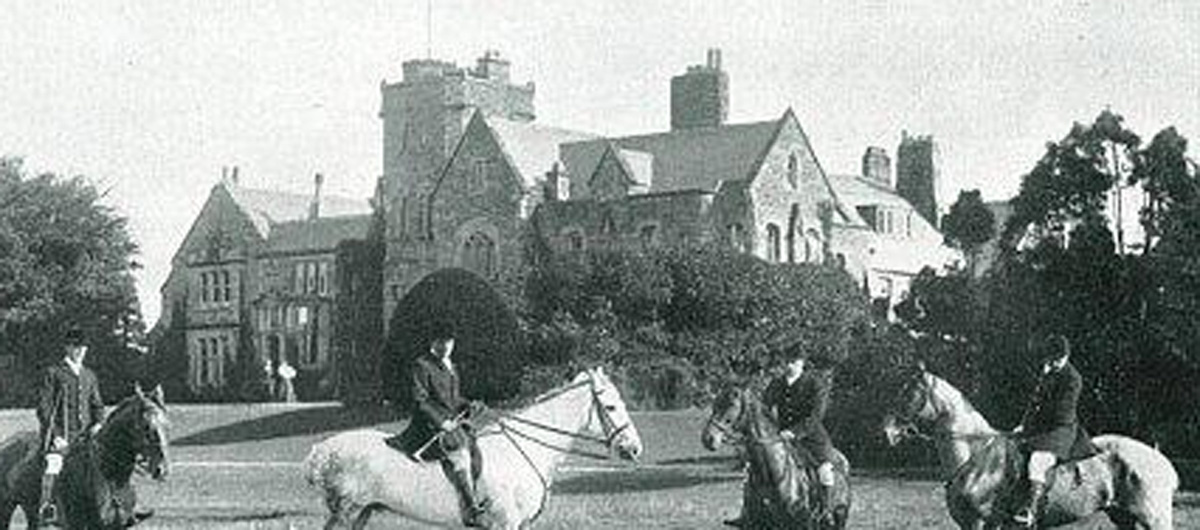
- Wyresdale Hall circa 1900

- Location in the Borough of Wyre Location in the Forest of Bowland
- 53.9364°N 2.7506°W
- Location: Scorton, Lancashire, England
- OS grid reference: SD 509,492

History
- Built: 1856–58
- Built for: Ormrod family

Site notes
- Architect: Edward Graham Paley
- Architectural style: Gothic Revival
- Website: wyresdalepark.co.uk

Listed Building – Grade II
- Designated: 3 December 2009
- Reference no.: 1393555

Wyresdale Park is an English country house and licensed wedding ceremony venue located within the Forest of Bowland, to the northeast of Scorton, Lancashire, England.

== History ==
The hall was built in 1856–58, and designed by the Lancaster architect Edward Graham Paley for the Ormrod family of Bolton. It has since been extended and outbuildings have been added. The hall is in Gothic Revival style. A lake was added to the grounds in 1897.

The hall and the farms and hill grazing were purchased in the 1920s by the Riddell family, and the farms and fell land were not acquired by the Whewell family until the 1970s when Mrs Riddell sold the estate to the Whewells, while retaining a life tenancy on the Hall. By the 2000s, the hall continued to be in a satisfactory condition, but the outbuildings were in a poor state and the gardens were overgrown. The family worked with Ruth Watson, and cooperated with the Channel 4's programme Country House Rescue, creating a café and arranging Open Days. The hall and its surrounding outbuildings are recorded in the National Heritage List for England as a designated Grade II listed building.

== The Ormrod family ==
Peter Ormrod (1796–1875) built Wyresdale Hall in 1856. He bought 6,000 acres from the Duke of Hamilton to create the estate. The house cost £50,000 (about £4m at today's value). The architect was Edward Graham Paley, who designed many buildings in Lancashire. Ormrod was a banker and cotton manufacturer. His father, James, was one of the founders of the Bolton Bank (now the Royal Bank of Scotland), and on his death, in 1825, Peter inherited the partnership in the bank. In 1838, Ormrod married Eliza Hardcastle, the daughter of one of his partners. On their marriage his father-in-law, Thomas Hardcastle, gave Ormrod Halliwell Hall, and the new owner made major alterations to the house. He also provided the entire funding for rebuilding the parish church in Bolton.

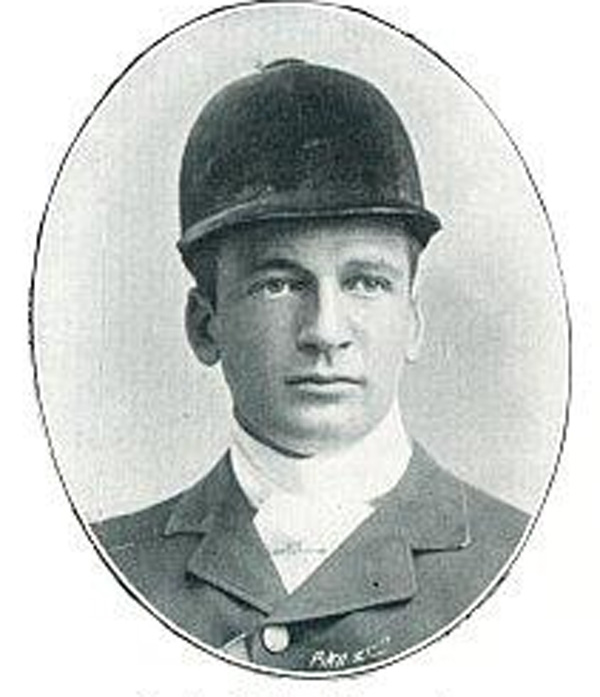
Captain Peter Ormrod (1869–1923)

The couple had no children and, therefore, when Ormrod died in 1875, Wyresdale Park was left to his nephew James Cross Ormrod; however, Eliza was given a life interest in the house and she remained there until her death in 1890. When James Cross Ormrod died in 1895 his son, Captain Peter Ormrod (1869–1923), inherited the estate.

Captain Peter Ormrod was a very outgoing man and made major improvements to the property. His most notable achievement was the establishment of the Wyresdale Fishery, which was said to be the largest in Europe. Two feature articles were written in 1899 in the magazine Country Life about the fishery. He also added a deer park and a lake to the estate. Also in 1899, it was widely reported in many newspapers that Ormrod had bought the whole of the fallow deer in Barningham Park, the seat of Sir F. A. Millbank.

In about 1912, Dame Laura Knight visited Wyresdale Park with her husband, Harold, at the request of the then owner Captain Peter Ormrod. In her autobiography, Knight mentions that during her stay she was inspired to paint "the grounds, the byres and the fells." One of these paintings was called "The Morning Ride", which depicts the fountain that still exists today in the grounds of the park.

In 1922, Ormrod sold Wyresdale Park. An advertisement for the sale is shown below. The estate was split, with the house and surrounding grounds being sold to Dr Hugh Riddell, and a large portion of the remaining land to Shepherd Whewell.

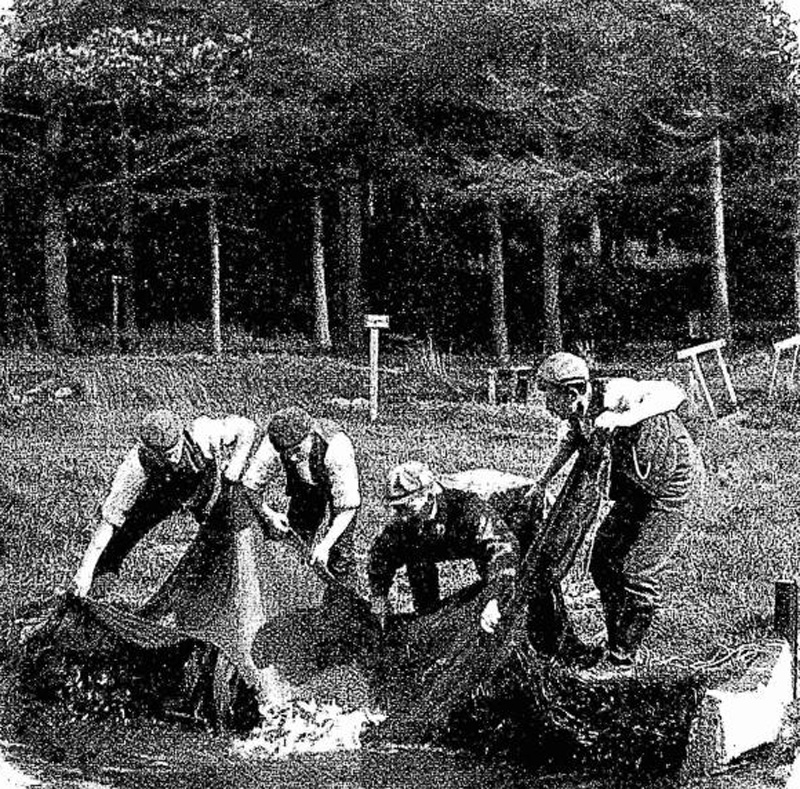
Releasing small trout into the pond at Wyresdale Fishery in 1900.

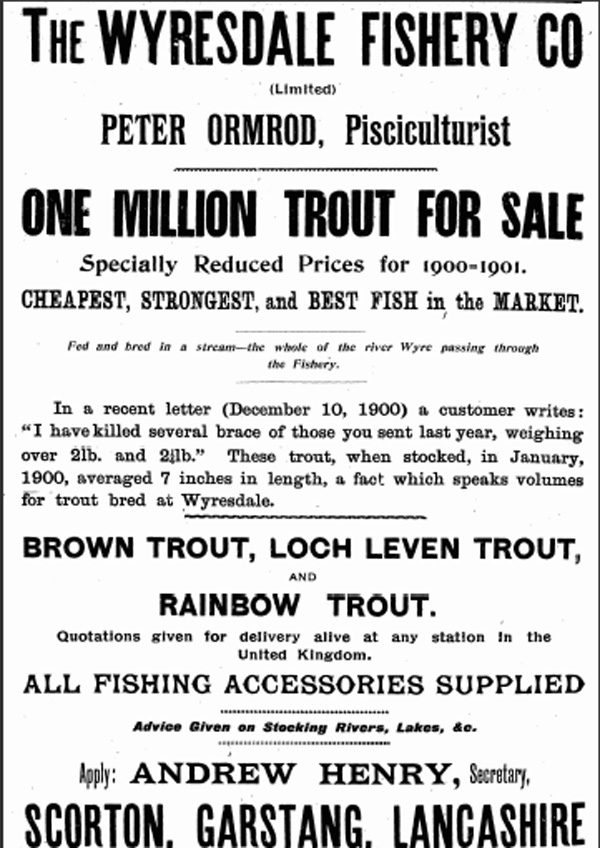
Advertisement for the sale of trout at Wyresdale Fishery in 1900.

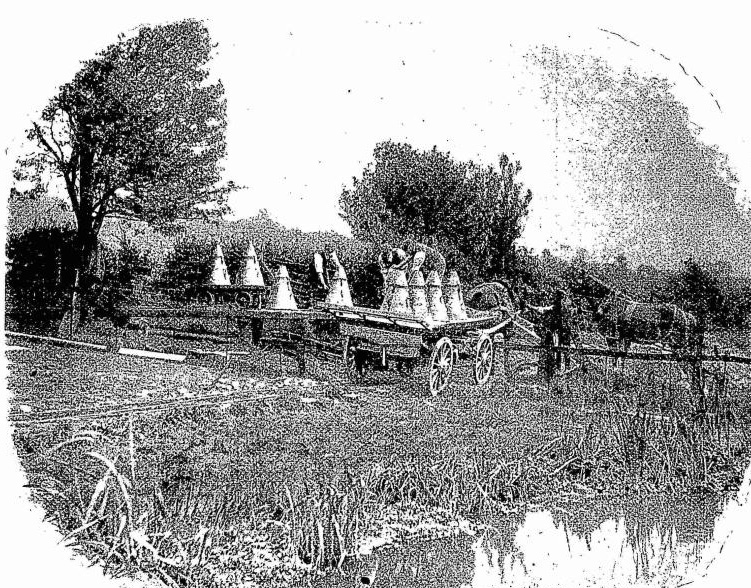
Loading fish from the ponds at Wyresdale Fishery in 1900.

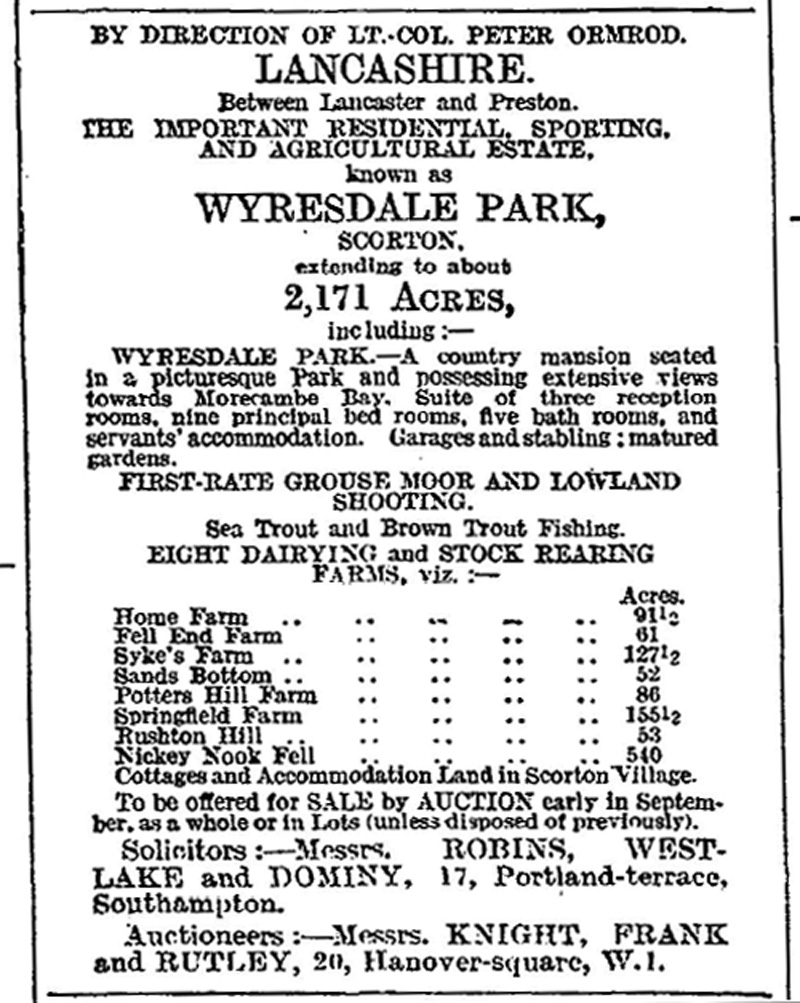
Advertisement for the sale of Wyresdale Park in the London Times in 1922.

== The Whewell family ==
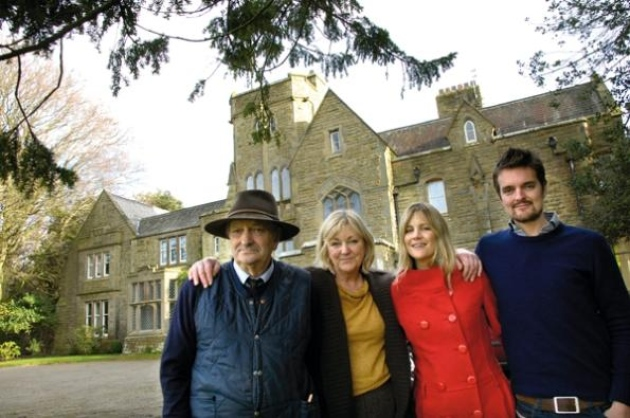
Whewell family

The estate broke up in the 1930s when the Riddell family bought the hall and grounds. Shepherd Whewell purchased much of the land. From the 1960s, he and his brother started re-uniting parcels of the estate, including the house, and concentrated on hunting partridge, pheasant and mallard. But trying to maintain such a costly concern on the income of 800 acres started to become a strain and action was needed to find new revenues. In 2011, Jim Whewell Jr. and his sister, Sarah, persuaded their parents to transform parts of the grounds around into a boutique camping destination.

The family was pointed in a different direction when they featured on Channel 4's Country House Rescue, a show in which presenter Ruth Watson gives blunt advice to owners of estates and stately piles struggling to keep their heads above water. The Whewells' first step was to convert the brick outbuildings and glasshouse in the walled garden into the Applestore Café, which is run by Sally Whewell. The next step was tapping into the 'glamping' market with two different experiences: Feather Down Lodges and The Orchard Bell Tents, both situated by the boating lake. In 2018, the estate moved into a new phase after restoring a large collection of Victorian barn buildings – a full set of stables, haylofts, a shippon and a piggery into unique spaces, especially for weddings. Co-worker shared office spaces have also been established, under James Whewell's’ guidance, to assist start-up businesses and establish a creative community.

== Awards ==
- 1965: Snowhill Lane Bridge - Civic Trust Award
- 2018: Marketing Lancashire Tourism Superstar - Finalist
- 2019: Great Northern Wedding Awards - Best Wedding Venue - Barn / Farm - Finalist
- 2019: Great Northern Wedding Awards - Best Creative Space - Finalist

== See also ==
- Listed buildings in Nether Wyresdale
- List of non-ecclesiastical works by E. G. Paley
