= Hutton Roof, Kirkby Lonsdale =

Village and civil parish in Cumbria, England

Coordinates: 54.197°N 2.661°W

Hutton Roof
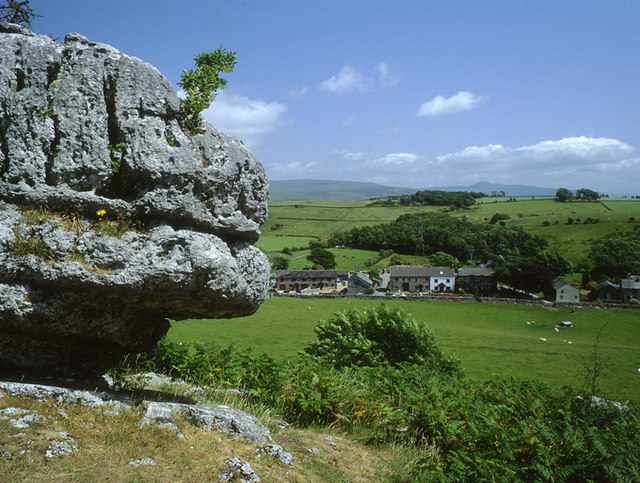
- Hutton Roof from the Cuckoo Stone

- Location within Cumbria
- Population: 218 (2011)
- OS grid reference: SD5778
- Civil parish: Hutton Roof
- Unitary authority: Westmorland and Furness
- Ceremonial county: Cumbria
- Region: North West
- Country: England
- Sovereign state: United Kingdom
- Post town: CARNFORTH
- Postcode district: LA6
- Dialling code: 01524
- Police: Cumbria
- Fire: Cumbria
- Ambulance: North West
- UK Parliament: Westmorland and Lonsdale

Hutton Roof is a village and civil parish in the Westmorland and Furness district of Cumbria, England, close to Kirkby Lonsdale and Hutton Roof Crags. Historically in Westmorland, the parish includes the hamlet of Newbiggin. In the 2001 census the parish had a population of 193, increasing at the 2011 census to 218.

Army Chaplain and Victoria Cross recipient Theodore Hardy (1863-1918) was Vicar of Hutton Roof while serving in the First World War.

== See also ==
- Listed buildings in Hutton Roof, Kirkby Lonsdale
