= Scorton, Lancashire =

Village in Lancashire, England

Coordinates: 53.933°N 2.760°W

Scorton
- St. Peter's Church, Scorton

- Location in Wyre Borough Location in the Forest of Bowland Location within Lancashire
- Population: 297 (2001 Census)
- OS grid reference: SD501488
- Civil parish: Nether Wyresdale
- District: Wyre
- Shire county: Lancashire
- Region: North West
- Country: England
- Sovereign state: United Kingdom
- Post town: PRESTON
- Postcode district: PR3
- Dialling code: 01524
- Police: Lancashire
- Fire: Lancashire
- Ambulance: North West
- UK Parliament: Lancaster and Fleetwood

Scorton is a small village near the River Wyre, in the Wyre district of Lancashire, England. It is located north of Garstang. The name means "farmstead near a ditch or ravine."

== Background ==
In the 19th century there was a cotton mill in the village and also a railway station on the West Coast Main Line which ran from 1841 until 1939. The village has three churches, a primary school, village hall, the Priory Hotel, Daisy Clough Nurseries and Wyresdale Park, and is home to The Barn garden centre, gift shop, cafe and restaurant. The annual Scorton Steam show takes place on Fathers' Day weekend in June each year and the Lancashire Game and Country Festival which takes place at the same purpose-built showground.

The hills around include Nicky Nook, on the edge of the Forest of Bowland.

== Buildings ==
St. Peter's Church, built 1878–79, one of three churches in the village, has a special family grave set up for the Farnworth and Metcalfe family, by James Metcalfe in the late 1950s.

Wyresdale Hall, built 1856–58, is one mile north-east and was built for the Ormrod family of Bolton.

Scorton Village Hall, built 1926, gifted by the Ormrod family to the people of the village.

== Hall ==
Wyresdale Hall, a grade II listed country house and estate with licensed wedding barns, fishing lake and host to the Apple Store Cafe is located near the village.

== People ==
- Thomas Hayton Mawson, landscape architect, was born here in 1861.
- John Parkinson, designer of many of Los Angeles' iconic buildings, was born here in 1861.

== Gallery ==
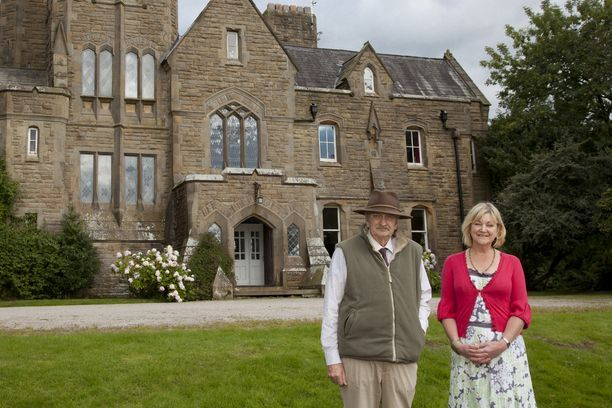
Wyresdale Hall

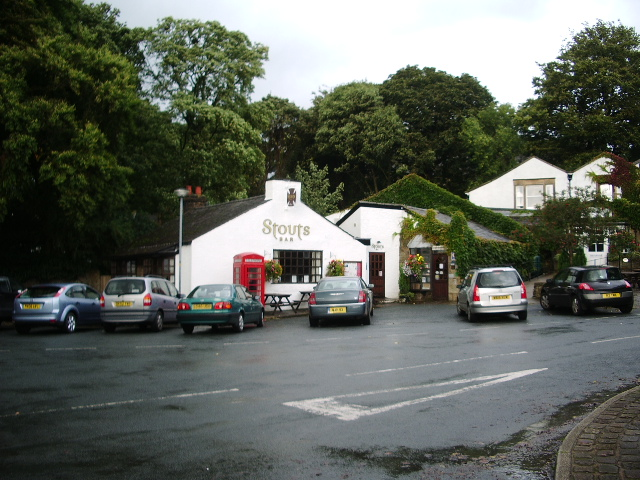
Stouts Bar

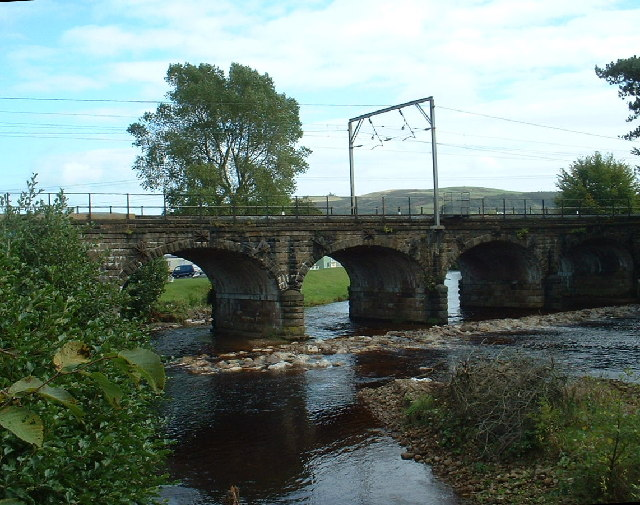
Six Arches Bridge

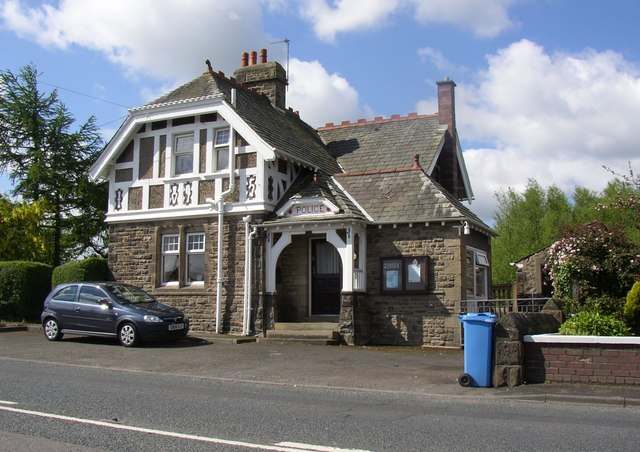
Old Police Station (A6)

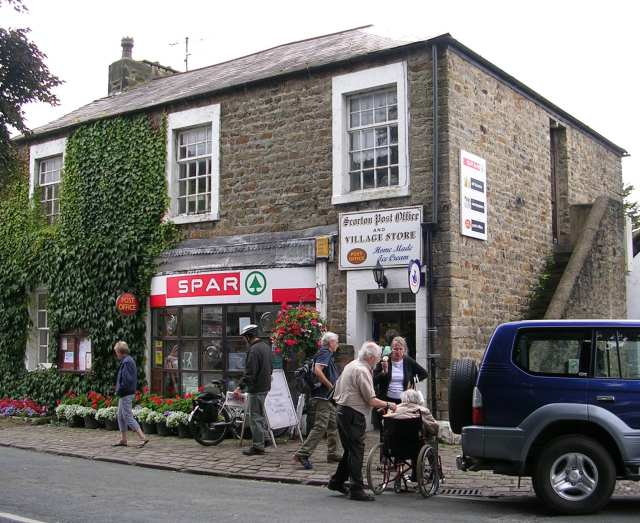
Scorton Village Shop and Post Office
