= Grade II* listed buildings in Lancashire =

Lancashire shown within England

There are over 20,000 Grade II* listed buildings in England. This page is a list of these buildings in the county of Lancashire by district.

== Blackburn with Darwen ==
Name	Location	Type	Completed (Note: The date given is the date used by Historic England as significant for the initial building or that of an important part in the structure's description.)	Date designated	Grid ref. (Note: The grid reference is based on the British national grid reference system, sometimes known as OSGB36, used by the Ordnance Survey.) Geo-coordinates	Entry number (Note: The "List Entry Number" is a unique number assigned to each listed building and scheduled monument by Historic England.)	Image
Brandwood Fold	Edgworth, North Turton	Farmhouse	17th century	27 January 1967	SD7401816378; 53°38′36″N 2°23′40″W	1241554	Brandwood Fold
Entwistle Hall	Entwistle, North Turton	Farmhouse	16th century	27 January 1967	SD7287217496; 53°39′12″N 2°24′43″W	1260432	Entwistle Hall
Horrocks Fold Farmhouse (Thimble Hall)	Edgworth, North Turton	Farmhouse	17th century	27 January 1967	SD7382316936; 53°38′54″N 2°23′51″W	1260435	Horrocks Fold Farmhouse (Thimble Hall)
New Hall, including cottage at rear	Entwistle, North Turton	House	1742	15 March 1974	SD7268817740; 53°39′20″N 2°24′53″W	1241559	New Hall, including cottage at rear
Summerhouse circa 100 metres east of Turton Tower	North Turton	Prospect tower	17th century	27 September 1984	SD7315015246; 53°37′59″N 2°24′27″W	1241997	Upload Photo
Old Hall Farmhouse	Pleasington	Farmhouse	1587	27 August 1952	SD6460226967; 53°44′16″N 2°32′17″W	1072418	Old Hall Farmhouse
Higher Hill Farmhouse	Tockholes	Farmhouse	17th century	24 November 1966	SD6576922585; 53°41′55″N 2°31′12″W	1241536	Higher Hill Farmhouse More images
Lower Hill	Tockholes	Farmhouse	Early 17th century	27 August 1952	SD6562022888; 53°42′05″N 2°31′20″W	1260460	Lower Hill
Ryal Farmhouse	Ryal Fold, Tockholes	Farmhouse	17th century	27 September 1984	SD6660421704; 53°41′27″N 2°30′26″W	1241544	Ryal Farmhouse
Church of St Peter	Darwen	Church	1827–29	27 September 1984	SD6943222223; 53°41′44″N 2°27′52″W	1163042	Church of St Peter More images
India Mill Chimney	Darwen	Mill	1867	27 September 1984	SD6937921710; 53°41′27″N 2°27′55″W	1362166	India Mill Chimney More images
Cathedral Church of St Mary the Virgin	Blackburn	Cathedral	1926	28 November 1951	SD6836027988; 53°44′50″N 2°28′53″W	1239147	Cathedral Church of St Mary the Virgin More images
Church of St Mark	Witton, Blackburn	Church	1836–38	19 April 1974	SD6658227626; 53°44′38″N 2°30′29″W	1239292	Church of St Mark More images
Church of St Silas	Blackburn	Church	Designed 1878	19 April 1974	SD6664828482; 53°45′06″N 2°30′26″W	1239161	Church of St Silas More images
Eddy Holes, stable and shippons to Eddy Holes	Bank Hey, Blackburn	House	16th century	28 November 1951	SD6957930956; 53°46′27″N 2°27′47″W	1222890	Eddy Holes, stable and shippons to Eddy Holes
Myles Wife Hey	Bank Hey, Blackburn	House	1543	28 November 1951	SD6940330375; 53°46′08″N 2°27′56″W	1273854	Myles Wife Hey
Darwen war memorial	Darwen	War memorial	1921	27 September 1984	SD6893021860; 53°41′32″N 2°28′19″W	1072435	Darwen war memorial More images

== Blackpool ==
Name	Location	Type	Completed	Date designated	Grid ref. Geo-coordinates	Entry number	Image
Church of the Sacred Heart	Blackpool	Church	1857	20 October 1983	SD3072636433; 53°49′10″N 3°03′13″W	1072015	Church of the Sacred Heart More images
Blackpool Grand Theatre	Blackpool	Theatre	1894	26 January 1972	SD3074936175; 53°49′02″N 3°03′12″W	1280615	Blackpool Grand Theatre More images
Thanksgiving Shrine of Our Lady of Lourdes	Blackpool	Chapel	1955–57	30 June 1999	SD3318436774; 53°49′23″N 3°00′59″W	1387319	Thanksgiving Shrine of Our Lady of Lourdes More images
The Winter Gardens	Blackpool	Conservatory	1875–78	10 October 1973	SD3089236162; 53°49′02″N 3°03′04″W	1072007	The Winter Gardens More images
Blackpool war memorial	Blackpool	War memorial	1923	20 October 1983	SD3057436469; 53°49′11″N 3°03′22″W	1072010	Blackpool war memorial More images

== Burnley ==
Name	Location	Type	Completed	Date designated	Grid ref. Geo-coordinates	Entry number	Image
Burwains	Briercliffe	Farmhouse	1642	1 April 1953	SD8873535779; 53°49′05″N 2°10′21″W	1072659	Burwains
Extwistle Hall and attached garden wall	Briercliffe	Farmhouse	16th to 17th century	1 April 1953	SD8760533800; 53°48′01″N 2°11′23″W	1072655	Extwistle Hall and attached garden wall More images
Barcroft Hall with attached garden wall and entrance gateway	Cliviger	House	16th to 17th century	1 April 1953	SD8656230417; 53°46′12″N 2°12′19″W	1072668	Barcroft Hall with attached garden wall and entrance gateway More images
The Holme	Cliviger	House	Early 17th century	1 April 1953	SD8782428361; 53°45′05″N 2°11′10″W	1362053	The Holme More images
Arched gateway and garden wall attached to south front of Shuttleworth Hall	Hapton	Gate	17th century	12 February 1985	SD7838032229; 53°47′09″N 2°19′47″W	1222599	Arched gateway and garden wall attached to south front of Shuttleworth Hall
Hargrove Farmhouse	Padiham	Farmhouse	Early to mid-17th century	28 August 1953	SD7967234845; 53°48′34″N 2°18′37″W	1237631	Hargrove Farmhouse
Stockbridge House	Padiham	House	Mid-17th century	28 August 1953	SD7984633574; 53°47′53″N 2°18′27″W	1274125	Stockbridge House
The Great Barn	Hurstwood, Worsthorne-with-Hurstwood	Aisled barn	Late 16th century	17 December 1968	SD8814531368; 53°46′43″N 2°10′53″W	1072638	The Great Barn
Hurstwood Hall	Hurstwood, Worsthorne-with-Hurstwood	Farmhouse	Post 1579	1 April 1953	SD8812031340; 53°46′42″N 2°10′54″W	1205736	Hurstwood Hall More images
Burnley war memorial	Towneley Park	War memorial	1926	19 November 1997	SD8554630858; 53°46′26″N 2°13′15″W	1247303	Burnley war memorial More images
Jackson's Farmhouse and cottage adjoining Jackson's Farmhouse and attached garden wall	Worsthorne-with-Hurstwood	Farmhouse	c. 1600	1 April 1953	SD8765932442; 53°47′17″N 2°11′20″W	1280581	Jackson's Farmhouse and cottage adjoining Jackson's Farmhouse and attached garden wall
Spenser House	Worsthorne-with-Hurstwood	Farmhouse	Mid-16th century	1 April 1952	SD8808531352; 53°46′42″N 2°10′56″W	1280543	Spenser House More images
Burnley Mechanics	Burnley	Mechanics institute	1854–55	29 September 1977	SD8398932409; 53°47′16″N 2°14′40″W	1244905	Burnley Mechanics More images
Church of St Peter	Burnley	Church	1791	10 November 1951	SD8429632957; 53°47′34″N 2°14′24″W	1022640	Church of St Peter More images

== Chorley ==
Name	Location	Type	Completed	Date designated	Grid ref. Geo-coordinates	Entry number	Image
Bank Hall	Bretherton	House	1832–33	22 October 1952	SD4625620215; 53°40′32″N 2°48′54″W	1362113	Bank Hall More images
Carr House	Bretherton	Farmhouse	Dated 1613; later alterations	22 October 1952	SD4627021474; 53°41′13″N 2°48′54″W	1163160	Carr House More images
Brindle Lodge	Brindle	House	c. 1808	22 October 1952	SD6031026651; 53°44′05″N 2°36′11″W	1072574	Brindle Lodge
Head O'th' Marsh Farmhouse	Brindle	Farmhouse	1692	17 April 1967	SD6136024885; 53°43′08″N 2°35′13″W	1072572	Head O'th' Marsh Farmhouse More images
Bolton Green Farmhouse	Charnock Richard	Farmhouse	1612	17 April 1967	SD5513017760; 53°39′16″N 2°40′49″W	1203550	Bolton Green Farmhouse
Lower House Farmhouse	Charnock Richard	Farmhouse	1654	17 April 1967	SD5593716268; 53°38′28″N 2°40′05″W	1203643	Upload Photo
Crow Trees	Walton-le-Dale, Clayton-le-Woods	Farmhouse	Earlier than 1600	27 November 1972	SD5803524463; 53°42′54″N 2°38′14″W	1211203	Crow Trees More images
Church of St Michael	Croston	Parish church	Pre-16th century	17 April 1967	SD4900918394; 53°39′34″N 2°46′23″W	1163631	Church of St Michael More images
Cuerden Hall	Cuerden	Country house	Early 18th century	21 February 1984	SD5639423929; 53°42′36″N 2°39′44″W	1362174	Cuerden Hall More images
Church of the Blessed Virgin Mary	Eccleston	Church	14th century	17 April 1967	SD5163717848; 53°39′18″N 2°44′00″W	1362129	Church of the Blessed Virgin Mary More images
Re-used Calvary Cross slab, churchyard of the Church of the Blessed Virgin Mary	Eccleston	Gravestone	13th to 15th century	24 June 2010	SD5162117832; 53°39′17″N 2°44′00″W	1393860	Re-used Calvary Cross slab, churchyard of the Church of the Blessed Virgin Mary
Re-used Elizabethan ledger slab in the churchyard of Church of the Blessed Virgin Mary	Eccleston	Gravestone	1584	24 June 2010	SD5166317853; 53°39′18″N 2°43′58″W	1393858	Re-used Elizabethan ledger slab in the churchyard of Church of the Blessed Virgin Mary
Buckshaw Hall	Euxton	House	1885	11 July 1975	SD5629920123; 53°40′33″N 2°39′47″W	1362139	Buckshaw Hall More images
Euxton Parish Church	Euxton	Church	Early 18th century	17 April 1967	SD5554318944; 53°39′54″N 2°40′27″W	1362144	Euxton Parish Church More images
Morris Farmhouse	Heapey	Farmhouse	1693	17 April 1967	SD6110818886; 53°39′54″N 2°35′24″W	1164224	Upload Photo
Hall O' Th' Hill	Heath Charnock	House	Early to mid-17th century	22 October 1952	SD6031415030; 53°37′49″N 2°36′06″W	1072473	Hall O' Th' Hill More images
Howe Brook House Farmhouse	Heskin	Farmhouse	17th century or earlier	17 April 1967	SD5217815301; 53°37′55″N 2°43′29″W	1072527	Upload Photo
Lane Ends House	Mawdesley	House	Early 17th century	17 April 1967	SD4878114876; 53°37′40″N 2°46′33″W	1072504	Upload Photo
Rivington Hall	Rivington	Courtyard house	Late 15th century	22 October 1952	SD6331014439; 53°37′31″N 2°33′22″W	1165012	Rivington Hall More images
Unitarian Chapel	Rivington	Unitarian chapel	1703	17 April 1967	SD6268814517; 53°37′33″N 2°33′56″W	1362126	Unitarian Chapel More images
Moss Lane Farmhouse	Whittle-le-Woods	Farmhouse	Late 17th century	21 May 1986	SD5877520399; 53°40′42″N 2°37′32″W	1247763	Upload Photo
Church of St George	Chorley	Church	1822–25	21 December 1966	SD5850917474; 53°39′08″N 2°37′45″W	1072441	Church of St George More images
Church of St Laurence	Chorley	Church	1824	21 December 1966	SD5829817765; 53°39′17″N 2°37′57″W	1072631	Church of St Laurence More images
Gillibrand Hall Barn	Chorley	Dwelling	1669	21 December 1966	SD5737516882; 53°38′48″N 2°38′47″W	1362045	Upload Photo
Higher Healey Farm House	Chorley	Farmhouse	1612	21 December 1966	SD6062218799; 53°39′51″N 2°35′51″W	1203835	Upload Photo
Lower Burgh Hall	Chorley	Farmhouse	Early 17th century or earlier	4 January 1977	SD5714615691; 53°38′10″N 2°38′58″W	1072644	Lower Burgh Hall

== Fylde ==
Name	Location	Type	Completed	Date designated	Grid ref. Geo-coordinates	Entry number	Image
Church of St Michael	Kirkham	Anglican church	1823	20 September 1985	SD4270932356; 53°47′04″N 2°52′16″W	1362357	Church of St Michael More images
Church of St Cuthbert	Lytham St Annes	Parish church	1834	13 January 1971	SD3570227222; 53°44′15″N 2°58′34″W	1196361	Church of St Cuthbert More images
Church of St John	Lytham St Annes	Church	1848–49	13 January 1971	SD3711027151; 53°44′13″N 2°57′18″W	1196368	Church of St John More images
Dovecote to north west of Lytham Hall (in woods behind stables)	Lytham St Annes	Dovecote	Late 18th century	13 January 1971	SD3558028062; 53°44′42″N 2°58′42″W	1219120	Dovecote to north west of Lytham Hall (in woods behind stables) More images
Fairhaven United Reformed Church	Fairhaven	Congregational chapel	1904	22 February 1991	SD3474527358; 53°44′19″N 2°59′27″W	1196364	Fairhaven United Reformed Church More images

== Hyndburn ==
Name	Location	Type	Completed	Date designated	Grid ref. Geo-coordinates	Entry number	Image
Church of St James	Altham	Church	1870	17 December 1968	SD7717033079; 53°47′37″N 2°20′53″W	1072721	Church of St James More images
Church of St Bartholomew	Great Harwood	Church	15th century	11 July 1966	SD7338732716; 53°47′24″N 2°24′20″W	1362006	Church of St Bartholomew More images
Church of St James	Church, Hyndburn	Church	Late Medieval	9 March 1984	SD7412329097; 53°45′27″N 2°23′38″W	1072728	Church of St James More images
Gatehouse at Martholme	Hyndburn	Gatehouse	1561	11 July 1966	SD7527133777; 53°47′59″N 2°22′37″W	1072735	Gatehouse at Martholme More images
Outer archway at Martholme	Hyndburn	Gate	1607	11 July 1966	SD7526833755; 53°47′58″N 2°22′37″W	1280458	Upload Photo
Parker's Farmhouse	Hyndburn	Farmhouse	c. 1600	23 June 1965	SD7200228961; 53°45′23″N 2°25′34″W	1206115	Upload Photo
Roman Catholic church of Our Lady and St Hubert, and attached presbytery	Great Harwood	Roman Catholic church	1857–59	9 March 1984	SD7369932177; 53°47′07″N 2°24′02″W	1280421	Roman Catholic church of Our Lady and St Hubert, and attached presbytery More images
Sparth Manor	Hyndburn	Farmhouse	Later than mid-17th century	11 July 1966	SD7462831461; 53°46′44″N 2°23′11″W	1205946	Upload Photo
Town Hall	Accrington	Town hall	1858	9 March 1984	SD7601528606; 53°45′12″N 2°21′55″W	1362011	Town Hall More images

== Lancaster ==
Name	Location	Type	Completed	Date designated	Grid ref. Geo-coordinates	Entry number	Image
Church of St John the Baptist	Arkholme, Arkholme-with-Cawood	Church	Late Perpendicular	4 October 1967	SD5890971825; 54°08′26″N 2°37′50″W	1071728	Church of St John the Baptist More images
Holy Trinity Church formerly Church of St Michael	Bolton-le-Sands	Church	Late 15th century	2 May 1968	SD4832967720; 54°06′10″N 2°47′30″W	1071944	Holy Trinity Church formerly Church of St Michael More images
Hawkshead Farmhouse	Bolton-le-Sands	Farmhouse	1665	1 August 1952	SD4844067730; 54°06′10″N 2°47′24″W	1362399	Upload Photo
Stable block north of Burrow Hall	Burrow-with-Burrow	Stable	c. 1740	4 October 1967	SD6165975959; 54°10′41″N 2°35′20″W	1164344	Upload Photo
Thurland Castle	Cantsfield	House	14th century	4 October 1967	SD6109173078; 54°09′07″N 2°35′50″W	1164439	Thurland Castle More images
Church of St Paul	Brookhouse, Caton-with-Littledale	Church	Norman	4 October 1967	SD5421764607; 54°04′31″N 2°42′04″W	1163957	Church of St Paul More images
Gresgarth Hall	Caton-with-Littledale	House	1802 (possibly later)	4 October 1967	SD5325363324; 54°03′49″N 2°42′57″W	1071812	Upload Photo
Claughton Hall Farmhouse	Claughton	House	15th century	4 October 1967	SD5665066518; 54°05′34″N 2°39′51″W	1071677	Upload Photo
Church of St Michael	Cockerham	Church	16th century	2 May 1968	SD4625651864; 53°57′36″N 2°49′14″W	1317937	Church of St Michael More images
Shepherd's Farmhouse	Cockerham	House	1705	2 May 1968	SD4537251496; 53°57′24″N 2°50′02″W	1071795	Upload Photo
Church of St Mary	Ellel	Church (disused)	1873	7 June 1979	SD4817053585; 53°58′33″N 2°47′30″W	1317926	Church of St Mary More images
Gressingham Hall and former stables adjoining	Gressingham	House	Late 17th century	4 October 1967	SD5729869908; 54°07′24″N 2°39′17″W	1164615	Upload Photo
Loyne Bridge	Gressingham	Bridge	Late Medieval	4 October 1967	SD5817169732; 54°07′18″N 2°38′29″W	1071682	Loyne Bridge More images
Halton Green East Farmhouse	Halton-with-Aughton	House	Early 17th century	4 October 1967	SD5160965366; 54°04′55″N 2°44′28″W	1071891	Halton Green East Farmhouse
Halton Green West Farmhouse	Halton-with-Aughton	Farmhouse	Late 17th century	4 October 1967	SD5157765334; 54°04′54″N 2°44′30″W	1362450	Upload Photo
Manor House	Halton-with-Aughton	House	1695	4 October 1967	SD5033264877; 54°04′39″N 2°45′38″W	1164390	Manor House More images
Cross base south of Church of St Margaret	Hornby-with-Farleton	Cross	Pre-Conquest	4 December 1985	SD5851468568; 54°06′41″N 2°38′10″W	1071658	Upload Photo
Over Hall	Ireby	House	Early 17th century	4 October 1967	SD6586975822; 54°10′37″N 2°31′28″W	1164939	Over Hall More images
Stables west of Over Hall	Ireby	Stable	1690	4 October 1967	SD6582975809; 54°10′37″N 2°31′30″W	1071662	Upload Photo
The Old Malt House	Melling-with-Wrayton	House	1684	4 October 1967	SD5964770990; 54°07′59″N 2°37′09″W	1071637	Upload Photo
Midland Hotel	Morecambe	Hotel	1932–33	8 October 1976	SD4281564380; 54°04′20″N 2°52′31″W	1208988	Midland Hotel More images
The Winter Gardens	Morecambe	Theatre	1896	7 October 1977	SD4309864383; 54°04′20″N 2°52′16″W	1025280	The Winter Gardens More images
Capernwray Hall	Over Kellet	Country house	1844	7 November 1983	SD5460672201; 54°08′37″N 2°41′47″W	1071908	Capernwray Hall More images
Church of St Cuthbert	Over Kellet	Church	13th century	4 October 1967	SD5225969550; 54°07′11″N 2°43′55″W	1071877	Church of St Cuthbert More images
Higher Lee	Over Wyresdale	House	1671	2 May 1968	SD5632355726; 53°59′45″N 2°40′04″W	1164115	Upload Photo
Church of St Helen	Overton	Church	12th century	2 May 1968	SD4404657576; 54°00′40″N 2°51′19″W	1071774	Church of St Helen More images
Quernmore Park	Quernmore	Country house	1795–98	4 October 1967	SD5165262767; 54°03′31″N 2°44′24″W	1317735	Upload Photo
Church of St John	Silverdale	Church	1885–86	2 May 1968	SD4632175401; 54°10′18″N 2°49′26″W	1362446	Church of St John More images
Slackwood Farmhouse	Silverdale	House	Late 17th century	2 May 1968	SD4744774569; 54°09′51″N 2°48′23″W	1362468	Slackwood Farmhouse More images
Manor House	Slyne-with-Hest	House	1861	1 August 1952	SD4776066005; 54°05′14″N 2°48′00″W	1071858	Manor House More images
Church of St James	Tatham	Church	Norman	4 October 1967	SD6059469421; 54°07′09″N 2°36′16″W	1317663	Church of St James More images
Robert Hall Farmhouse and farm building adjoining to east in same range	Tatham	Farmhouse	Late 16th century	4 October 1967	SD6370269191; 54°07′02″N 2°33′24″W	1071577	Robert Hall Farmhouse and farm building adjoining to east in same range More images
Ashton Hall Gatehouse	Thurnham	Gatehouse	c. 1600	1 August 1952	SD4613557290; 54°00′32″N 2°49′24″W	1164553	Upload Photo
Former stable block west of Ashton Hall	Thurnham	House	17th century	1 August 1952	SD4610757314; 54°00′32″N 2°49′26″W	1071715	Upload Photo
Gillow Mausoleum, north of Church of St Thomas and St Elizabeth	Thurnham	Mausoleum	c. 1830	7 March 1985	SD4655854321; 53°58′56″N 2°48′59″W	1164592	Gillow Mausoleum, north of Church of St Thomas and St Elizabeth More images
Church of St Michael	Whittington	Church	Early 16th century	4 October 1967	SD5996876284; 54°10′51″N 2°36′53″W	1071615	Church of St Michael More images
Sellet Hall	Whittington	House	c. 1600	4 October 1967	SD6003877415; 54°11′27″N 2°36′50″W	1071649	Sellet Hall More images
Whittington Hall	Whittington	Country house	1831–36	4 October 1967	SD5962976250; 54°10′50″N 2°37′12″W	1362568	Whittington Hall More images
Leighton Hall	Yealand Conyers	Country house	1765	2 May 1968	SD4944274416; 54°09′47″N 2°46′33″W	1071836	Leighton Hall More images
Quaker Meeting House	Yealand Conyers	Friends meeting house	1692	2 May 1968	SD5038474425; 54°09′48″N 2°45′41″W	1308669	Quaker Meeting House More images
The Castle	Yealand Redmayne	House	Late 17th century	1 August 1952	SD5018475530; 54°10′23″N 2°45′53″W	1308587	Upload Photo
Chapel of Ripley St Thomas School	Lancaster	School	1888	18 February 1970	SD4767060701; 54°02′23″N 2°48′02″W	1194928	Upload Photo
Church of St John	Lancaster	Church	Consecrated 1755	22 December 1953	SD4778461907; 54°03′02″N 2°47′57″W	1289679	Church of St John More images
City Museum, the Old Town Hall	Lancaster	Prison	1781–83	22 December 1953	SD4760661728; 54°02′56″N 2°48′06″W	1194971	City Museum, the Old Town Hall More images
Conservative Club and attached railings	Lancaster	House	1637	22 December 1953	SD4754761870; 54°03′00″N 2°48′10″W	1290518	Conservative Club and attached railings More images
Friends Meeting House	Lancaster	House	1852	22 December 1953	SD4729861681; 54°02′54″N 2°48′23″W	1211515	Friends Meeting House More images
Lancaster Cathedral (also known as "Cathedral Church of St Peter" and "St Peter's Cathedral")	Lancaster	Parish church	1857–59	10 November 1994	SD4810461511; 54°02′49″N 2°47′39″W	1214397	Lancaster Cathedral (also known as "Cathedral Church of St Peter" and "St Peter's Cathedral") More images
Maritime Museum	Lancaster	Steps	1884–c. 1930	22 December 1953	SD4735762274; 54°03′13″N 2°48′20″W	1289088	Maritime Museum More images
Moor Hospital, Blocks 40, 41, 42, 44, and 46	Lancaster	Psychiatric hospital	1816	24 January 1994	SD4925661503; 54°02′49″N 2°46′35″W	1289436	Moor Hospital, Blocks 40, 41, 42, 44, and 46 More images
Music Room	Lancaster	Apartment	1953	22 December 1953	SD4752361763; 54°02′57″N 2°48′11″W	1298332	Music Room More images
National Westminster Bank	Lancaster	Bank	1870	13 March 1995	SD4760561858; 54°03′00″N 2°48′06″W	1290544	National Westminster Bank
18 and 18a Castle Park, including attached Privy House	Lancaster	Apartment	Early 18th century; altered c. 1975	22 December 1953	SD4736861762; 54°02′57″N 2°48′19″W	1194942	18 and 18a Castle Park, including attached Privy House More images
Pebble forecourt to 18, 18a, 20 and 22 Castle Park	Lancaster	Forecourt	18th or early 19th century	18 February 1970	SD4737961765; 54°02′57″N 2°48′19″W	1194944	Upload Photo
Penny's Almshouses including chapel and screen wall	Lancaster	Almshouses	1720	22 December 1953	SD4754261625; 54°02′52″N 2°48′10″W	1195001	Penny's Almshouses including chapel and screen wall More images
Queen Victoria Memorial	Lancaster	Statue	1906	18 February 1970	SD4786761615; 54°02′52″N 2°47′52″W	1290440	Queen Victoria Memorial More images
Ring O' Bells Public House	Lancaster	House	Mid-18th century	22 December 1953	SD4761461502; 54°02′49″N 2°48′06″W	1194999	Ring O' Bells Public House More images
Royal Albert Hospital (original part only)	Lancaster	Hospital	1888	30 November 1970	SD4766060082; 54°02′03″N 2°48′02″W	1194930	Royal Albert Hospital (original part only) More images
Skerton Bridge	Lancaster	Road bridge	1788	18 February 1970	SD4795662355; 54°03′16″N 2°47′47″W	1212253	Skerton Bridge More images
The Old Hall Inn	Lancaster	Cross wing house	1598	29 December 1950	SD4147861158; 54°02′35″N 2°53′43″W	1207212	The Old Hall Inn More images
Town Hall	Lancaster	Banqueting house	1906–09	22 December 1953	SD4786561552; 54°02′50″N 2°47′52″W	1194923	Town Hall More images
42 and 44 Church Street	Lancaster	House	Early 18th century	18 February 1970	SD4767261839; 54°02′59″N 2°48′03″W	1210232	42 and 44 Church Street
22 Castle Park	Lancaster	House	Early 18th century	22 December 1953	SD4739361753; 54°02′57″N 2°48′18″W	1290779	22 Castle Park
20 Castle Park	Lancaster	House	1720	22 December 1953	SD4738361756; 54°02′57″N 2°48′18″W	1194943	20 Castle Park More images
38–42 Parliament Street	Lancaster	Toll house	c. 1787	22 December 1953	SD4805662279; 54°03′14″N 2°47′42″W	1194984	38–42 Parliament Street
78 and 80 Church Street	Lancaster	House	1775	22 December 1953	SD4753761875; 54°03′01″N 2°48′10″W	1298413	78 and 80 Church Street More images
War memorial, Westfield War Memorial Village	Lancaster	War memorial	1926	13 March 1995	SD4690561690; 54°02′54″N 2°48′45″W	1195055	War memorial, Westfield War Memorial Village

== Pendle ==
Name	Location	Type	Completed	Date designated	Grid ref. Geo-coordinates	Entry number	Image
Coates Hall	Barnoldswick	Apartment	Early 18th century	5 July 1950	SD8845647409; 53°55′22″N 2°10′38″W	1258915	Coates Hall
Independent Methodist Church including steps and railings to street	Barnoldswick	Gate	1892	29 January 1988	SD8759146519; 53°54′53″N 2°11′25″W	1273192	Independent Methodist Church including steps and railings to street More images
Higherford Old Bridge	Barrowford	Packhorse bridge	16th to 17th century	6 June 1952	SD8625240182; 53°51′28″N 2°12′38″W	1273194	Higherford Old Bridge More images
Lamb Working Men's Club	Barrowford	House	1696	6 June 1952	SD8586139620; 53°51′09″N 2°12′59″W	1073429	Lamb Working Men's Club
Garden entrance to Hobstones Farmhouse	Colne	Wall	1704	29 January 1988	SD8821441682; 53°52′16″N 2°10′51″W	1361721	Upload Photo
Hobstones Cottages, Hobstones Farmhouse	Colne	Farmhouse	Early 18th century	29 January 1953	SD8819541695; 53°52′17″N 2°10′52″W	1272929	Upload Photo
The Grammar School	Earby	School	17th century	18 May 1950	SD9068546968; 53°55′08″N 2°08′36″W	1272938	The Grammar School More images
Accornlee Hall Farmhouse	Foulridge	House	Late 17th century	1 April 1953	SD8942643011; 53°52′59″N 2°09′44″W	1361742	Accornlee Hall Farmhouse More images
Ball House	Foulridge	House	1627	1 April 1953	SD8784142364; 53°52′38″N 2°11′11″W	1073357	Upload Photo
Church of St Mary, Newchurch in Pendle	Goldshaw Booth	Church	1718	29 January 1988	SD8230439373; 53°51′01″N 2°16′14″W	1361745	Church of St Mary, Newchurch in Pendle More images
Sabden Great Hall	Goldshaw Booth	House	Early 17th century	1 April 1953	SD8105738352; 53°50′28″N 2°17′22″W	1361707	Sabden Great Hall
Ashlar Cottage, Ashlar House	Higham-with-West Close Booth	House	1594	29 January 1988	SD8217736995; 53°49′44″N 2°16′20″W	1243453	Ashlar Cottage, Ashlar House
Lower Town House	Nelson	House	17th century	5 March 1952	SD8777037457; 53°50′00″N 2°11′14″W	1073369	Lower Town House
Greenhead Farmhouse	Reedley Hallows	House	Mid-17th century	1 April 1953	SD8292036059; 53°49′14″N 2°15′39″W	1272792	Greenhead Farmhouse
Wood End Farmhouse	Salterforth	Farmhouse	1686	29 January 1988	SD8817543786; 53°53′24″N 2°10′53″W	1073353	Upload Photo
Bank House Bridge	Trawden Forest	Clapper bridge	Undateable	26 October 1964	SD9359038905; 53°50′47″N 2°05′56″W	1243830	Bank House Bridge More images
Clapper Bridge	Wycoller, Trawden Forest	Bridge	Undateable	23 April 1952	SD9323739198; 53°50′56″N 2°06′15″W	1243829	Clapper Bridge More images
Grain kiln with stable to rear of no. 39	Winewall, Trawden Forest	Corn drying kiln	c. 1700	25 February 1970	SD9121639969; 53°51′21″N 2°08′06″W	1243705	Grain kiln with stable to rear of no. 39
Pack Horse Bridge	Wycoller, Trawden Forest	Packhorse bridge	17th century or earlier	23 April 1952	SD9323439248; 53°50′58″N 2°06′16″W	1243828	Pack Horse Bridge More images
Pierson's Farmhouse	Trawden Forest	Farmhouse	Late 17th century	23 April 1952	SD9318639271; 53°50′59″N 2°06′18″W	1073327	Pierson's Farmhouse
Remains of Wycoller Hall, including boundary wall to river	Trawden Forest	House	1596	23 April 1952	SD9327039207; 53°50′57″N 2°06′14″W	1073331	Remains of Wycoller Hall, including boundary wall to river More images

== Preston ==
Name	Location	Type	Completed	Date designated	Grid ref. Geo-coordinates	Entry number	Image
Wing of former Barton Old Hall, circa 20 metres south of Old Hall Farmhouse	Barton	Bungalow	Pre-16th century	11 November 1966	SD5305138199; 53°50′16″N 2°42′54″W	1073560	Upload Photo
Parish church of St John the Baptist	Broughton	Parish church	1533	11 November 1966	SD5289934373; 53°48′13″N 2°43′00″W	1164208	Parish church of St John the Baptist More images
Barn circa 75 metres north of Whinneyclough Farmhouse	Goosnargh	Farm building	1639	11 November 1966	SD5692739278; 53°50′53″N 2°39′22″W	1317617	Upload Photo
Bushells Hospital	Goosnargh	House	1722	25 July 1952	SD5600836862; 53°49′34″N 2°40′11″W	1073535	Bushells Hospital More images
Church of St Mary	Goosnargh	Church	Late Medieval	11 November 1966	SD5595136922; 53°49′36″N 2°40′14″W	1361634	Church of St Mary More images
Scotch Green Farmhouse with integral shippon and stable and attached granary	Goosnargh	Farmhouse	Early 17th century	11 November 1966	SD5405540560; 53°51′33″N 2°42′00″W	1073544	Upload Photo
Ashes Farmhouse with wall surrounding front garden	Whittingham	Farmhouse	1683	11 November 1966	SD5944637490; 53°49′55″N 2°37′04″W	1073517	Upload Photo
Church of St Anne	Woodplumpton	Church	Medieval	11 November 1966	SD4993434445; 53°48′14″N 2°45′42″W	1073482	Church of St Anne More images
Arkwright House	Preston	House	19th century	12 June 1950	SD5429729269; 53°45′28″N 2°41′41″W	1279775	Arkwright House More images
Church of St George the Martyr	Preston	Church	1799	27 September 1979	SD5377429441; 53°45′33″N 2°42′09″W	1217949	Church of St George the Martyr More images
Church of St Ignatius	Preston	Baptistery	1912	27 September 1979	SD5416929933; 53°45′49″N 2°41′48″W	1218482	Church of St Ignatius More images
Church of St John the Divine	Preston	Parish church	1853–55	27 September 1979	SD5420029353; 53°45′31″N 2°41′46″W	1292457	Church of St John the Divine More images
Church of St Michael	Preston	Church hall	1908	27 September 1979	SD5186830109; 53°45′54″N 2°43′54″W	1207268	Church of St Michael More images
Church of St Wilfrid	Preston	Roman Catholic church	1793	27 September 1979	SD5376529221; 53°45′26″N 2°42′10″W	1207254	Church of St Wilfrid More images
Former Church of St Mark	Preston	Church	1862–63	27 September 1979	SD5270729871; 53°45′47″N 2°43′08″W	1291672	Former Church of St Mark More images
Harris Institute	Preston	Art school	1979	27 September 1979	SD5400028932; 53°45′17″N 2°41′57″W	1207231	Harris Institute More images
Sessions House	Preston	Court house	1900–03	27 September 1979	SD5404529476; 53°45′35″N 2°41′55″W	1279796	Sessions House More images
St Peter's Arts Centre, University of Central Lancashire	Preston	University	1950	12 June 1950	SD5341929925; 53°45′49″N 2°42′29″W	1219062	St Peter's Arts Centre, University of Central Lancashire More images
The Bull and Royal Hotel	Preston	Assembly rooms	Mid-18th century	12 June 1950	SD5414229340; 53°45′30″N 2°41′49″W	1207263	The Bull and Royal Hotel More images

== Ribble Valley ==
Name	Location	Type	Completed	Date designated	Grid ref. Geo-coordinates	Entry number	Image
Barn on north-west side of farmyard	Hall Barns, Aighton, Bailey and Chaigley	Barn	16th century	13 February 1967	SD6928338805; 53°50′40″N 2°28′06″W	1072302	Upload Photo
Greengore	Aighton, Bailey and Chaigley	House	c. 1600	13 February 1967	SD6737038915; 53°50′44″N 2°29′51″W	1308723	Greengore More images
Old Bridge	Aighton, Bailey and Chaigley	Bridge	1562	29 December 1952	SD7040039164; 53°50′52″N 2°27′05″W	1362197	Old Bridge More images
Shireburn Cottages	Aighton, Bailey and Chaigley	Almshouse	1706	29 December 1952	SD6844238250; 53°50′22″N 2°28′52″W	1308779	Shireburn Cottages More images
Bashall Hall	Bashall Eaves	Hall house	c. 1600	16 November 1954	SD7108042347; 53°52′35″N 2°26′29″W	1072193	Bashall Hall More images
Farm building 12 metres north of Bashall Hall	Bashall Eaves	Farm building	1984	16 November 1954	SD7109042378; 53°52′36″N 2°26′28″W	1362282	Farm building 12 metres north of Bashall Hall
Garden pavilion, approximately 90 metres south of Bashall Hall	Bashall Eaves	Garden house	Early 18th century	16 November 1954	SD7105242247; 53°52′32″N 2°26′30″W	1072195	Upload Photo
Hacking Barn	Billington and Langho	Cruck barn	c. 1600	13 March 1986	SD7114337052; 53°49′44″N 2°26′24″W	1072064	Upload Photo
Alder House	Bolton-by-Bowland	House	1708	16 November 1954	SD7658050451; 53°56′59″N 2°21′30″W	1072207	Upload Photo
Bolton Peel Farmhouse	Bolton-by-Bowland	House	17th century	16 November 1954	SD7765748656; 53°56′01″N 2°20′30″W	1362310	Bolton Peel Farmhouse More images
Fooden Hall	Bolton-by-Bowland	House	Late 17th century	16 November 1954	SD8000048958; 53°56′11″N 2°18′22″W	1072201	Fooden Hall
Stakes	Bowland Forest Low	House	Early 17th century	16 November 1983	SD6464343672; 53°53′17″N 2°32′22″W	1163248	Stakes More images
Laneside Farmhouse	Chatburn	House	1677	29 December 1952	SD7732745226; 53°54′10″N 2°20′48″W	1362326	Laneside Farmhouse More images
Church of St Bartholomew	Chipping	Church	Early 16th century	13 February 1967	SD6221043323; 53°53′05″N 2°34′35″W	1072279	Church of St Bartholomew More images
Old Vicarage	Chipping	House	16th century	13 February 1967	SD6087141961; 53°52′21″N 2°35′48″W	1147251	Old Vicarage
Post Office and John Brabin's House	Chipping	House	1668	29 December 1952	SD6231443325; 53°53′05″N 2°34′29″W	1362244	Post Office and John Brabin's House
New Hall	Clayton-le-Dale	House	1665	27 August 1952	SD6620935418; 53°48′50″N 2°30′53″W	1164471	New Hall
Parish Church of St Mary Magdalene	Clitheroe	Church	14th to 15th century	19 May 1950	SD7443342072; 53°52′27″N 2°23′25″W	1362179	Parish Church of St Mary Magdalene More images
Dinckley Hall	Dinckley	House	c. 1600	24 November 1966	SD6887636635; 53°49′30″N 2°28′28″W	1072070	Dinckley Hall
Church of St Leonard	Downham	Church	Late 15th century	13 February 1967	SD7843344304; 53°53′40″N 2°19′47″W	1164023	Church of St Leonard More images
Downham Hall	Downham	Country house	c. 1600	13 December 1977	SD7829844309; 53°53′40″N 2°19′54″W	1072125	Downham Hall More images
Old Well Hall	Downham	House	17th century	27 April 1984	SD7857444159; 53°53′35″N 2°19′39″W	1318034	Old Well Hall More images
Dutton Hall	Dutton	House	c. 1600	25 July 1952	SD6620736795; 53°49′35″N 2°30′54″W	1308566	Dutton Hall More images
Huntingdon Hall	Dutton	House	Early 17th century	25 July 1952	SD6607538884; 53°50′42″N 2°31′02″W	1147370	Huntingdon Hall More images
Hammerton Hall	Easington	House	c. 1600	16 November 1954	SD7188053761; 53°58′45″N 2°25′49″W	1362269	Hammerton Hall More images
Church of St Mary	Gisburn	Church	12th century	16 November 1954	SD8299048862; 53°56′08″N 2°15′38″W	1164472	Church of St Mary More images
Pair of lodges at southern entrance to Gisburne Park with six stone piers and linking railings and gates	Gisburn	Gate pier	c. 1800	16 November 1954	SD8276448933; 53°56′10″N 2°15′50″W	1362297	Pair of lodges at southern entrance to Gisburne Park with six stone piers and linking railings and gates More images
Old Bridge, Lower Hodder (that part in the former Bowland Rural District)	Great Mitton	Bridge	1562	16 November 1954	SD7041339155; 53°50′52″N 2°27′04″W	1163514	Old Bridge, Lower Hodder (that part in the former Bowland Rural District) More images
Horton Hall and barn adjoining to south west	Horton	House	Early 18th century	16 November 1954	SD8521250467; 53°57′00″N 2°13′37″W	1317730	Upload Photo
Mitton Hall	Little Mitton	House	c. 1844	29 December 1952	SD7168638516; 53°50′32″N 2°25′54″W	1362324	Mitton Hall More images
Alston Old Hall	Longridge	House	Early 15th century	8 November 1949	SD6116133535; 53°47′48″N 2°35′28″W	1072296	Alston Old Hall
Little Mearley Hall	Mearley	House	Late 16th century	29 December 1952	SD7753241617; 53°52′13″N 2°20′35″W	1164780	Upload Photo
Stanley House	Mellor	House	1640	24 August 1952	SD6456429933; 53°45′52″N 2°32′21″W	1164519	Stanley House More images
Newton Hall	Newton	House	Mid to late 18th century	16 November 1954	SD6976850401; 53°56′56″N 2°27′44″W	1072246	Newton Hall More images
Barn at Oxendale Hall Farm, south west of Oxendale Hall	Osbaldeston	Barn	c. 1600	13 March 1986	SD6505833401; 53°47′45″N 2°31′55″W	1317727	Upload Photo
Osbaldeston Hall	Osbaldeston	House	16th century	27 August 1952	SD6441134422; 53°48′18″N 2°32′31″W	1072072	Osbaldeston Hall More images
Oxendale Hall	Osbaldeston	Cross wing house	1656	27 August 1952	SD6510433429; 53°47′46″N 2°31′52″W	1072075	Oxendale Hall More images
Park House	Paythorne	House	17th century	16 November 1954	SD8100549699; 53°56′35″N 2°17′27″W	1362345	Upload Photo
Standen Hall	Pendleton	Country house	1757	29 December 1952	SD7473640275; 53°51′29″N 2°23′08″W	1072085	Standen Hall More images
Read Hall	Read	House	1825	1 April 1953	SD7573834815; 53°48′33″N 2°22′12″W	1164581	Read Hall More images
Almshouses	Stydd, Ribchester	Almshouse	1726	25 July 1952	SD6538235805; 53°49′03″N 2°31′38″W	1308488	Almshouses More images
Brennand's Endowed School	Slaidburn	School	Early 18th century	16 November 1954	SD7102752141; 53°57′52″N 2°26′35″W	1072224	Brennand's Endowed School More images
Townhead	Slaidburn	House	19th century	16 November 1954	SD7102652631; 53°58′08″N 2°26′35″W	1072190	Townhead More images
Church of St Helen	Waddington	Church	c. 1500	16 November 1954	SD7286643822; 53°53′24″N 2°24′52″W	1163679	Church of St Helen More images
Sands Cottage	Whalley	Timber-framed house	15th century	13 February 1967	SD7297436212; 53°49′17″N 2°24′43″W	1164758	Upload Photo

== Rossendale ==
Name	Location	Type	Completed	Date designated	Grid ref. Geo-coordinates	Entry number	Image
Carter Place Hall	Rossendale	House	Late 18th century	20 June 1967	SD7847624834; 53°43′10″N 2°19′40″W	1163485	Upload Photo
Church of St John the Evangelist	Crawshawbooth	Church	1890–92	7 June 1971	SD8101425174; 53°43′21″N 2°17′21″W	1163934	Church of St John the Evangelist More images
Church of St Nicholas with St John	Newchurch	Church	1561	7 June 1971	SD8342822339; 53°41′50″N 2°15′09″W	1072799	Church of St Nicholas with St John More images
Crawshaw Hall	Crawshawbooth	House	1831	7 June 1971	SD8091924948; 53°43′14″N 2°17′26″W	1163900	Crawshaw Hall More images
Edenfield parish church	Edenfield	Church	1826	9 August 1966	SD7985819809; 53°40′28″N 2°18′23″W	1318084	Edenfield parish church More images
Ewood Hall	Rossendale	Farmhouse	1641	23 November 1979	SD7948320851; 53°41′01″N 2°18′44″W	1072806	Ewood Hall
Forest House	Bacup	House	c. 1828	19 June 1968	SD8674322768; 53°42′04″N 2°12′08″W	1072857	Forest House More images
Friends' Meeting House	Crawshawbooth	House	1739	7 June 1971	SD8107925366; 53°43′28″N 2°17′18″W	1361998	Friends' Meeting House More images
Harrier Hound monument to Methuselah Yates in churchyard to south of Church of St Nicholas with St John	Newchurch	Commemorative monument	1864	9 May 2003	SD8342022290; 53°41′48″N 2°15′09″W	1390506	Harrier Hound monument to Methuselah Yates in churchyard to south of Church of St Nicholas with St John More images
Old Baptist Chapel	Goodshaw	Baptist chapel	1760	7 June 1971	SD8153226303; 53°43′58″N 2°16′53″W	1072764	Old Baptist Chapel More images
Waggoner Tunstead Farmhouse	Stacksteads	Farmhouse	1632	19 June 1968	SD8533922176; 53°41′45″N 2°13′25″W	1072843	Waggoner Tunstead Farmhouse More images

== South Ribble ==
Name	Location	Type	Completed	Date designated	Grid ref. Geo-coordinates	Entry number	Image
Church of St Michael	Much Hoole	Church	1875	11 November 1966	SD4630322321; 53°41′40″N 2°48′53″W	1361870	Church of St Michael More images
Church of St Mary	Penwortham	Church	14th century	11 November 1966	SD5240029001; 53°45′19″N 2°43′24″W	1073058	Church of St Mary More images
Arrowsmith House	Walton-le-Dale	House	Earlier than 1700	24 March 1950	SD5930526532; 53°44′01″N 2°37′06″W	1074106	Arrowsmith House More images
Church of St Andrew	Leyland	Church	14th century	26 July 1951	SD5411121591; 53°41′19″N 2°41′47″W	1073036	Church of St Andrew More images
Church of St Leonard	Walton-le-Dale	Church	Late Medieval	24 March 1950	SD5614128121; 53°44′51″N 2°40′00″W	1074102	Church of St Leonard More images
Osbaldeston House	Walton-le-Dale	Farmhouse	1661	1 September 1960	SD5724627950; 53°44′46″N 2°38′59″W	1290091	Upload Photo
Seed Lee Farmhouse	Walton-le-Dale	Farmhouse	17th century	27 February 1984	SD5835724965; 53°43′10″N 2°37′57″W	1361353	Upload Photo
Todd Hall	Walton-le-Dale	House	1630	24 March 1950	SD5518226022; 53°43′43″N 2°40′51″W	1074111	Todd Hall
Walker monument approximately 20 metres south of Chancel of Church of St Andrew	South Ribble	Grave slab	1588	27 February 1984	SD5413621564; 53°41′19″N 2°41′45″W	1290442	Walker monument approximately 20 metres south of Chancel of Church of St Andrew More images
Worden Old Hall	Buckshaw Village	Manor house	Late 16th century	4 August 1975	SD5619720899; 53°40′58″N 2°39′53″W	1361900	Worden Old Hall More images

== West Lancashire ==
Name	Location	Type	Completed	Date designated	Grid ref. Geo-coordinates	Entry number	Image
Moor Hall	Aughton	House	Early 19th century	11 October 1968	SD4114805366; 53°32′30″N 2°53′22″W	1361828	Upload Photo
Barn about 100 metres south-west of Martin Hall Farmhouse (not included)	Burscough	Barn	17th century	11 August 1972	SD4257012264; 53°36′14″N 2°52′10″W	1196636	Upload Photo
Church of St John	Burscough	Church	1829–32	11 August 1972	SD4449912328; 53°36′16″N 2°50′25″W	1220393	Church of St John More images
Stone Hall	Dalton	House	Early 18th century	22 April 1967	SD5089007738; 53°33′50″N 2°44′35″W	1278390	Upload Photo
Church of St Michael	Great Altcar	Church	1879	11 October 1968	SD3197106520; 53°33′03″N 3°01′42″W	1230934	Church of St Michael More images
Lathom House, former west wing	Lathom	Country house	c. 1730	11 August 1972	SD4596009147; 53°34′34″N 2°49′03″W	1290908	Lathom House, former west wing More images
Woodcock Hall	Newburgh	House	Rebuilt 1719	11 May 1953	SD4831009828; 53°34′57″N 2°46′56″W	1221001	Upload Photo
Barn about 30 metres south of Fairhurst Hall	Parbold	Barn	Early 18th century	19 August 1988	SD4902611634; 53°35′56″N 2°46′18″W	1361842	Upload Photo
Parbold Hall	Parbold	House	17th century	19 November 1951	SD5116410718; 53°35′27″N 2°44′21″W	1278311	Upload Photo
Simonswood Hall	Simonswood	House	1687	11 October 1968	SD4169501129; 53°30′13″N 2°52′50″W	1343471	Simonswood Hall More images
Church of St Mary	Tarleton	Church	1719	11 October 1968	SD4567020128; 53°40′29″N 2°49′26″W	1073122	Church of St Mary More images
Johnson's Farmhouse	Upholland	Farmhouse	1647	7 January 1952	SD5226406937; 53°33′25″N 2°43′19″W	1219837	Upload Photo
Manor House	Crawford, Upholland	Manor house	1718	7 January 1952	SD5008103107; 53°31′20″N 2°45′16″W	1201667	Upload Photo
Newgate Farmhouse	Upholland	Farmhouse	Earlier than 1707	7 January 1952	SD5089805238; 53°32′29″N 2°44′33″W	1219813	Upload Photo
Old Grammar School, to rear of nos. 8–14 (nos. 8–14 not included)	Upholland	Workshop	19th or 20th century	7 January 1952	SD5248505155; 53°32′27″N 2°43′06″W	1220218	Upload Photo
Aspinalls Farmhouse	Wrightington	Farmhouse	1663	7 January 1952	SD5220608453; 53°34′14″N 2°43′23″W	1240748	Upload Photo
Halliwell Farmhouse	Wrightington	Farmhouse	18th century	7 January 1952	SD5180908596; 53°34′18″N 2°43′45″W	1073026	Upload Photo
Harrock Hall	Wrightington	House	Early 17th century	19 November 1951	SD5077212440; 53°36′22″N 2°44′44″W	1231056	Upload Photo
Wrightington Hall	Wrightington	Country house	c. 1700	4 October 1972	SD5314610636; 53°35′25″N 2°42′34″W	1361885	Wrightington Hall More images
Bath Lodge	Ormskirk	Hunting lodge	Early to mid-18th century	11 August 1972	SD4254909229; 53°34′35″N 2°52′09″W	1221197	Bath Lodge More images
Church of St Peter and St Paul	Ormskirk	Parish church	12th century	11 May 1953	SD4130608436; 53°34′09″N 2°53′16″W	1221160	Church of St Peter and St Paul More images
Water tower on Tower Hill	Ormskirk	Water tower	1853–54	22 March 1976	SD4231908453; 53°34′10″N 2°52′21″W	1197069	Water tower on Tower Hill More images

== Wyre ==
Name	Location	Type	Completed	Date designated	Grid ref. Geo-coordinates	Entry number	Image
1 and 2 The Street	Claughton	House	1689	17 April 1967	SD5131742777; 53°52′44″N 2°44′31″W	1361927	Upload Photo
Kirkland Hall	Kirkland	House	16th century	16 December 1952	SD4802043561; 53°53′08″N 2°47′32″W	1361955	Kirkland Hall
Church of St John the Baptist	Pilling	Church	1886–87	17 April 1967	SD4030548626; 53°55′49″N 2°54′38″W	1073081	Church of St John the Baptist More images
Old Church of St John Baptist	Pilling	Church	1766	17 April 1967	SD4027348477; 53°55′44″N 2°54′40″W	1073080	Old Church of St John Baptist More images
Parrox Hall	Preesall	House	Early 17th century	8 November 1949	SD3601747843; 53°55′22″N 2°58′33″W	1073082	Upload Photo
Church of St Chad	Poulton-le-Fylde	Church	Early 17th century	23 September 1950	SD3482739455; 53°50′50″N 2°59′32″W	1072401	Church of St Chad More images
Marsh Mill	Thornton	Drying kiln	1794	24 March 1950	SD3356242553; 53°52′30″N 3°00′43″W	1073150	Marsh Mill More images

== See also ==
- Category:Grade II* listed buildings in Lancashire
- Scheduled monuments in Lancashire
