= Listed buildings in Waddington, Lancashire =

Waddington is a civil parish in Ribble Valley, Lancashire, England. It contains 23 listed buildings that are recorded in the National Heritage List for England. Of these, one is at Grade II*, the middle grade, and the others are at Grade II, the lowest grade. The parish includes the village of Waddington, and surrounding countryside. Many of the listed buildings are houses or farmhouses and associated structures. Also listed are a church and structures in the churchyard, bridges, a war memorial, and the village stocks.

== Key ==
Grade	Criteria
II*	Particularly important buildings of more than special interest
II	Buildings of national importance and special interest

== Buildings ==
Name and location	Photograph	Date	Notes	Grade
St Helen's Church; 53.88992°N 2.41441°W		c. 1500	The oldest part of the church is the tower, the nave and chancel being rebuilt in 1898–1901 by Austin and Paley. It is in sandstone with a stone-slate roof, and consists of a nave with a clerestory, a chancel, aisles with transepts, a south porch, and a west tower. The tower is in three stages, and has angle buttresses, and an embattled parapet with gargoyles and corner pinnacles. The aisles also have embattled parapets.	II*
Waddington Hall; 53.88971°N 2.41327°W		Early 17th century (possible)	The house was rebuilt in about 1900. It is in sandstone with a stone-slate roof, and has an H-shaped plan consisting of a main range with two cross wings. These wings are gabled, and between them is a balustrade. Most of the windows are mullioned or mullioned and transomed, and there is also a cross window. In the angle between the main range and the right cross wing is a doorway with a moulded surround and a Tudor arched head. This wing also contains a two-storey canted bay window.	II
Daisy Hill Farmhouse; 53.90696°N 2.43561°W	—	Late 17th century	The farmhouse is in stone with a stone-slate roof, and has two storeys and two bays. The windows have retained most of their mullions, and the doorway has a stone porch with a sloping roof. Above the inner doorway is an inscribed lintel.	II
Sundial; 53.88978°N 2.41457°W		1686	The sundial is in the churchyard of St Helen's Church, and was restored in the 20th century. It is in sandstone, and has a square plan. Towards the top each face has an inscription, and below the shaft is chamfered and grooved. On the top is a dated plate.	II
Tomb of Robert Parker; 53.88991°N 2.41409°W	—	1718	The tomb chest is in the churchyard of St Helen's Church. It is in sandstone, and has an inscribed slab and carved panels on the sides. The carvings on the south side include a skull and crossbones and the coat of arms of the Parker family, and on the east side are flowers, and a hand and sickle.	II
The Readers House; 53.89184°N 2.41766°W	—	Early 18th century	A house in pebbledashed stone with a stone-slate roof, it has two storeys and two bays. The windows are mullioned with three lights. In the centre the doorway has an open porch with monolithic sides, and a moulded segmental head on moulded brackets. Above the doorway is a blank niche with a moulded surround. At the rear is a later wing.	II
Brook House Farmhouse and barn 53.88883°N 2.41289°W	—	Mid 18th century	The house and barn are in pebbledashed stone with a slate roof. The house has two storeys and two bays. The windows are mullioned, those in the upper floor having three plights, and those in the ground floor having two. Between the bays is a doorway with a chamfered surround. The barn to the left has an outshut acting as a porch.	II
Sundial base 53.88977°N 2.41429°W	—	18th century (probable)	The sundial base is in the churchyard of St Helen's Church. It is in sandstone, and has a square plan, chamfered edges, and a moulded cap.	II
Lane Side; 53.89287°N 2.40329°W		1752	A sandstone house with quoins and a stone-slate roof, in two storeys, and with a symmetrical two-bay front. The windows are sashes with architraves. In the centre is a doorway with a surround of chamfered rustication, a lintel with carved voussoirs, and a cornice. Above this is a plaque with a moulded surround, a frieze with a false keystone, and a cornice. The plaque contains carved decoration, initials, and the date.	II
Gateway, Waddington Hospital; 53.89137°N 2.41369°W	—	Mid to late 18th century (probable)	The gateway is in sandstone with a moulded open pediment on open quoins. The doorway has rusticated jambs, a flat lintel with false voussoirs and with a projecting false keystone. Above this is an inscribed plaque with a moulded border.	II
Beechthorpe; 53.89024°N 2.41675°W	—	Late 18th century	A roughcast house with a hipped stone-slate roof, in two storeys, with a front of four bays. The doorway has a plain surround and most of the windows are sashes. The right side has three bays and a central doorway that has a semicircular head with a projecting keystone, imposts, and a fanlight.	II
Brungerley Farmhouse; 53.88271°N 2.39933°W	—	Late 18th century	The house is pebbledashed with a stone-slate roof, and has two storeys. The older part has three bays and contains mullioned windows. The later part, dating from the 19th century, is higher and has two bays. The windows in the upper floor are sashes. In the ground floor is a doorway with a plain surround and a semicircular head, and a canted bay window.	II
Glebe House; 53.89155°N 2.41797°W	—	Late 18th century (possible)	Originally a vicarage, the house is in stone with sandstone dressings and a slate roof. It has two storeys and is in three parallel ranges with a south face of three bays. On the east face are three gables, and contain a doorway with a reeded surround and a door with a fanlight. Most of the windows are sashes.	II
Post Office and adjoining house 53.89096°N 2.41521°W		Late 18th century	The Post Office and house are in pebbledashed stone with a slate roof, and have three storeys and two bays. In the ground floor of the Post Office is a shop front, and elsewhere the windows are mullioned. The doorways are paired in the centre, and have plain surrounds.	II
Thornbers; 53.90297°N 2.42460°W	—	Late 18th century	A sandstone house with a stone-slate roof, in two storeys and three bays. The doorway and windows have plain surrounds, the windows being mullioned and most having three lights.	II
Waddow Hall; 53.87966°N 2.40470°W		Late 18th century	A country house incorporating material from the 17th century, it is in pebbledashed stone with a slate roof. There are two storeys with attics, and a continuous dormer that was added to the south face in 1927. The main range has a front of five bays, with quoins, a moulded cornice, and a parapet. The windows on the front are sashes with architraves, and the doorway has a semicircular head, Tuscan pilasters, a broken fluted entablature, and an open pediment. To the left is a set-back range of four bays, and at the rear some of the windows are mullioned.	II
New Hall; 53.88921°N 2.41549°W	—	c.1800	The house contains some 17th-century material. It is in pebbledashed stone with sandstone dressings, quoins, and a slate roof. The house has two storeys and two bays, and the windows are sashes with semicircular heads. The doorway dates from the 17th century, and has moulded jambs and a shaped lintel.	II
Stephen Bridge; 53.87171°N 2.41589°W		Early 19th century (probable)	The bridge carries Edisford Road over Bashall Brook. It is in sandstone, and consists of a single segmental arch. The bridge has solid parapets, string courses, and weathered copings. On the west side of the north parapet is an inscription.	II
Waddington Bridge; 53.89119°N 2.41447°W	—	Early 19th century (probable)	The bridge carries West Bradford Road over Waddington Brook. It is in sandstone, and consists of a single segmental arch. The bridge has solid parapets, string courses, and weathered copings. At the eastern end are terminal round piers.	II
Pump, Waddington Hospital; 53.89154°N 2.41407°W		Early 19th century (probable)	The pump is in the grounds of Waddington Hospital. It is in lead with a cast iron handle and base, and timber casing. The pump has a square section, with a spout projecting from the cistern. There is a plate on each face with a relief including a deer.	II
West wall, Waddington Hall; 53.88956°N 2.41366°W		1900	The wall is in sandstone with a roughly embattled top, and the gates are in wrought iron. At the north end is a doorway with a segmental head, and a pair of gate piers each topped by a pyramid and a ball finial. There is a similar gateway at the south end. In the centre is a gateway with a moulded surround, an arch with a segmental head, and stepped coping with two finials. Above the arch is an inscription and a carved coat of arms.	II
War memorial 53.88935°N 2.41366°W		1919	The war memorial stands on a plinth carved to resemble a rock outcrop. It consists of a stone Celtic cross, about 1.8 metres (5 ft 11 in) tall, that is decorated with interlace patterns. On the plinth are panels inscribed with the names of those lost in both world wars.	II
Stocks; 53.89002°N 2.41448°W	—	Uncertain	The stocks consist of two sandstone piers, each with a square section and a rounded top. They are grooved to contain two wooden boards with four holes.	II
