= St George's Church, Chorley =

Coordinates: 53.6521°N 2.6292°W

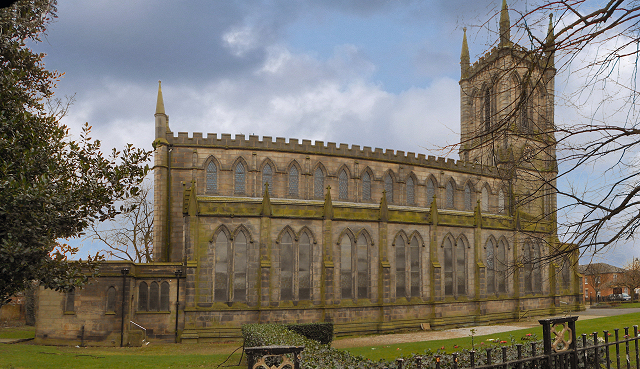
- St George's Church, Chorley, from the north

- Location in the Borough of Chorley
- OS grid reference: SD 585,175
- Location: St George's Street, Chorley, Lancashire
- Country: England
- Denomination: Anglican
- Churchmanship: Traditional Anglican
- Website: St Georges, Chorley

History
- Status: Parish church
- Dedication: Saint George

Architecture
- Functional status: Active
- Heritage designation: Grade II*
- Designated: 21 December 1966
- Architect: Thomas Rickman
- Architectural type: Church
- Style: Gothic Revival (Early English)
- Groundbreaking: 1822
- Completed: 1825
- Construction cost: £12,387

Specifications
- Materials: Stone, slate roof

Clergy
- Vicar: The Revd Michael Print

St George's Church is in St George's Street, Chorley, Lancashire, England. It is an active Anglican parish church in the deanery of Chorley, the archdeaconry of Blackburn, and the diocese of Blackburn. The church is recorded in the National Heritage List for England as a designated Grade II* listed building. It was a Commissioners' church, having received a grant towards its construction from the Church Building Commission.

== History ==
The church was built between 1822 and 1825 to a design by Thomas Rickman. A grant of £12,387 (equivalent to £1,000,000 in 2025) was given towards its construction by the Church Building Commission. It was originally a chapel of ease to the mother church of St Laurence, and became a separate parish in 1856. Later three more parishes were created within its boundaries, St Peter, which had earlier been a district within the parish, St James in 1879, and All Saints in the 1950s.

== Architecture ==
=== Exterior ===
St George's is constructed in ashlar stone with a slate roof. Its architectural style is Early English. The plan consists of a nave and chancel in one cell with a clerestory, north and south aisles, and a west tower. The tower is in four stages with angle buttresses rising to octagonal pinnacles. It has a west doorway under a crocketed gable above which is a tall lancet window. In three sides of the third stage are clock faces. In the top stage are arcades of tall lancets, the outer ones being blind. The parapet is embattled. The nave and aisles are in seven bays. The bays of the aisles are separated by buttresses rising to pinnacles, and each bay contains a pair of lancet windows. Each bay of the clerestory also contains a pair of lancets. The east window consists of five stepped lancets.

=== Interior ===
Inside the church the arcades are carried on eight thin piers. There are galleries on three sides carried on cast iron pillars, their fronts being decorated with tracery. The ceiling is flat, carried on cast iron, decorated hammerbeams. At the west end of the north aisle is a baptistry containing a white marble font consisting of an angel carrying a scalloped bowl. The octagonal sculpted pulpit was made by Thomas Rawcliffe of Chorley. The eagle lectern is a memorial to the church's first vicar. The stained glass in the east window is also to the first vicar's memory and is dated 1875. There is a window in the south chancel wall dated 1877, and windows in the north chancel wall dated 1914 and 1920. The glass in the west window is by Stephen Adam, and depicts the Resurrection. The chandeliers were installed in 1977, having previously been in St Mary's Church, Ulverston. The clock in the tower was installed in 1920. The three-manual organ was made in about 1870 by Kirtland and Jardine, with modifications by E. Walklet in 1934. The bells consist of an Ellacombe Chime, made by Mears and Stainbank at the Whitechapel Bell Foundry, and installed in 1919.

== See also ==
- Grade II* listed buildings in Lancashire
- List of Commissioners' churches in Northeast and Northwest England
- Listed buildings in Chorley
