= St Silas' Church, Blackburn =

Coordinates: 53.7516°N 2.5074°W

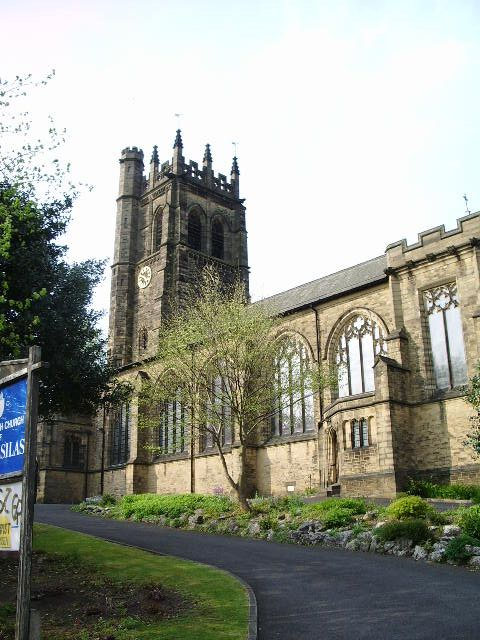
- St Silas' Church, Blackburn, from the southeast

- Location in Blackburn
- OS grid reference: SD 667,285
- Location: Blackburn, Lancashire
- Country: England
- Denomination: Anglican
- Website: St Silas, Blackburn

History
- Status: Parish church
- Dedication: Saint Silas

Architecture
- Functional status: Active
- Heritage designation: Grade II*
- Designated: 19 April 1974
- Architect: Paley and Austin
- Architectural type: Church
- Style: Gothic Revival
- Groundbreaking: 1894
- Completed: 1914

Specifications
- Materials: Sandstone, slate roofs

Administration
- Province: York
- Diocese: Blackburn
- Archdeaconry: Blackburn
- Deanery: Blackburn with Darwen
- Parish: St Silas, Blackburn

Clergy
- Priest: Fr. David D'Silva

St Silas' Church is in Preston New Road, Blackburn, Lancashire, England. It is an active Anglican parish church in the deanery of Blackburn with Darwen, the archdeaconry of Blackburn, and the diocese of Blackburn. The church is recorded in the National Heritage List for England as a designated Grade II* listed building.

== History ==
St Silas' was designed in 1878 by the Lancaster architects Paley and Austin, but building did not start until 1894. The first phase was completed by 1898, this did not include the tower. The church cost £10,000 (equivalent to £1,120,000 in 2025), and provided seating for 609 people. The tower, measuring 104 feet (32 m) in height, was not added until 1913–14. At the same time a porch was built, but the planned spire was never added; this phase cost over £6,000. Before the church was built, services had been held from 1846 in a nearby Sunday school, and then in a school built in 1884–85.

== Architecture ==
=== Exterior ===
The church is constructed in sandstone with freestone dressings. The external walls are in yellow sandstone; the internal walls in red sandstone. The roofs are slated. Its plan consists of a nave with north and south aisles, a southwest porch, a north transept containing the organ chamber, a south transept comprising a chapel, a chancel with a north vestry, another vestry in the angle between the south transept and aisle, and a west tower. The architectural style is Gothic Revival, described in the National Heritage List as Perpendicular, and by the authors of the Buildings of England series as Decorated. The tower is in three stages, with angle buttresses, and a polygonal stair turret at the southwest corner that rises to a level higher than the tower. On the summit of the tower are pierced embattled parapets and pinnacles. The tower has a west doorway, above which is a five-light window. In its middle stage are pairs of ogee-headed windows, clock faces, and a frieze of shields. The top stage contains louvred bell openings, one on the south side, and two in pairs on each of the other sides. Along the walls of the aisles are large four-light windows. The porch is tall with an embattled parapet, canted angles, and angle buttresses. Above its moulded entrance arch is a statue of Saint Silas in a niche surmounted by a pinnacle. The transepts contain pairs of square-headed two-light windows, and have embattled parapets. The chancel has a south square-headed two-light window, a seven-light east window, a parapet of blind quatrefoils, and a southeast turret with a spirelet.

=== Interior ===
The appearance of the interior of the church is "one of spaciousness, nobility and grandeur imparted by the handling of the proportions". It is "richly furnished in a high-church fashion". The tower arch is triple-chamfered, while the chancel arch and the transept arches are all double-chamfered. The arcades consist of double-chamfered arches carried on square piers that are set diagonally. In the chancel are a round-headed sedilia and piscina. The octagonal font dates from 1896, and is carved with buttresses and blind tracery. It has a tall wooden 20th-century cover in Gothic style. The square pulpit also dates from 1896, it was made by Dent and Marshall from Runcorn stone, carved with blind tracery. The alabaster reredos was imported from Italy in 1915, and contains niches, canopies, and statues. The stained glass in two of the windows was made by Morris & Co. in 1908 and 1911. The design of the earlier window is based on cartoons by William Morris and Edward Burne-Jones, although both were dead by the time the windows were made. It depicts Saint Anne and the Adoration of the Magi. The later window was designed by J. H. Dearle, and depicts the Presentation of Jesus at the Temple. In addition there is a window designed by Henry Holiday towards the end of his career in 1921–23, which depicts Old Testament figures, including David and Gideon with angels. The three-manual organ was built in 1904 by Harrison and Harrison of Durham. It was altered in 1925 by the same firm, and in 1991 by J. Corkhill of Wigan. There is a ring of eight bells, all of which were cast in 1888 by John Taylor and Company of Loughborough.

== See also ==
- Grade II* listed buildings in Lancashire
- Listed buildings in Blackburn
- List of ecclesiastical works by Paley and Austin
- List of ecclesiastical works by Austin and Paley (1895–1914)
