= St Michael and All Angels Church, Ashton-on-Ribble =

Coordinates: 53.7651°N 2.7316°W

St Michael and All Angels with St Mark Preston
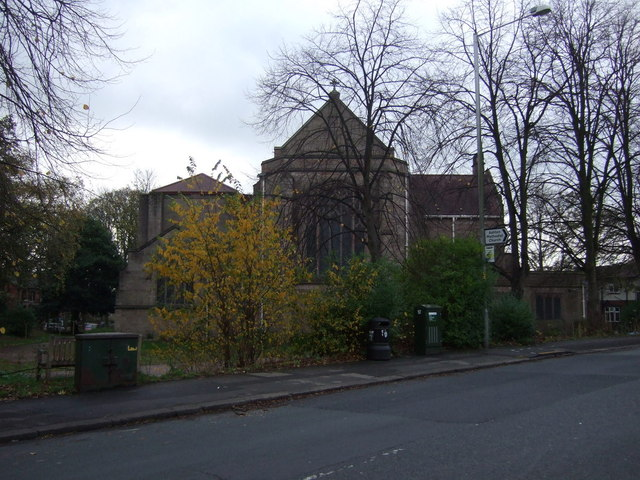
- Aspect from Tulketh Road

- Location in Preston
- OS grid reference: SD519301
- Location: Egerton Road, Ashton-on-Ribble, Preston, Lancashire
- Country: England
- Denomination: Anglican
- Website: St Michael and All Angels, Ashton on Ribble

History
- Status: Parish church
- Consecrated: 2 July 1908

Architecture
- Functional status: Active
- Heritage designation: Grade II*
- Architect: Austin and Paley
- Architectural type: Church
- Style: Gothic Revival
- Groundbreaking: 1906
- Completed: 1915

Specifications
- Materials: Sandstone, red tiled roofs

Administration
- Province: York
- Diocese: Blackburn
- Archdeaconry: Lancaster
- Deanery: Preston

Clergy
- Priest: Vacant

St Michael and All Angels with St Mark's Church is in Egerton Road, Ashton-on-Ribble, Preston, Lancashire, England. It is an active Anglican parish church in the deanery of Preston, the archdeaconry of Lancaster, and the diocese of Blackburn. Its benefice is united with those of St Mark, Preston, and St Andrew, Ashton-on-Ribble, to form the benefice of the West Preston Team. The church is recorded in the National Heritage List for England as a designated Grade II* listed building.

== History ==
St Michael's originated as a chapel of ease to St Andrew's Church, Ashton-on-Ribble, to cope with the rising population in the area. Its foundation stone was laid in September 1906, and the church was consecrated by the Bishop of Manchester on 2 July 1908. At this time the chancel, the organ and part of the nave were completed. at a cost of £6,047 (equivalent to £630,000 in 2025). The architects responsible for the design were Austin and Paley of Lancaster. The building of the nave was completed in July 1915, but the planned upper part of the tower was never built. St Michael's became a separate parish in December 1929. In 1993 the benefice of the church was united with that of St Mark, Preston, and in April 2006, it was further united with St Andrew, Ashton-on-Ribble.

== Architecture ==
=== Exterior ===
The church is constructed in snecked sandstone with ashlar dressings and red tiled roofs. Its plan consists of a nave and chancel in one range, a clerestory, and north and south aisles. On the south side are a porch, the uncompleted tower, and a chapel. On the north side are a transept, a vestry, and an attached parish hall. Its architectural style is Perpendicular "in Arts and Crafts manner". Along the sides of the clerestory are two-light windows, with ten on the north side and seven on the south. The aisle windows are square-headed with mullions, most of which have three lights. At the west end is a large five-light window. Above the doorway in the south porch is a panel with a carving of Saint Michael. The tower consists of one tall stage, with angle buttresses, a south doorway over which is a five-light window and, at the summit, a pyramidal roof. On the south side of the chancel are three clerestory windows, and at its east end is a short canted sanctuary with buttresses. The east window has five lights. The chapel has two south windows, a four-light east window, and an embattled parapet.

=== Interior ===
The arcades consist of five bays carried on octagonal piers. The stained glass in the east window dates from 1968 and is by Harry Stammers. Elsewhere are windows from the early 20th century that are probably by Shrigley and Hunt. The three-manual organ was built in 1934 by Henry Ainscough, and overhauled by its maker in 1953.

== See also ==
- Grade II* listed buildings in Lancashire
- Listed buildings in Preston, Lancashire
- List of ecclesiastical works by Austin and Paley (1895–1916)
