= Burnley Mechanics =

Listed building in Lancashire, England

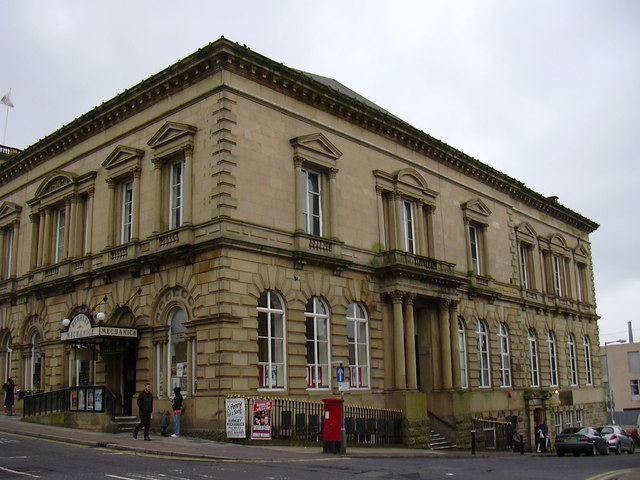

- Location within Burnley town centre
- Address: Manchester Road, Burnley, England
- Coordinates: 53.7878°N 2.2445°W
- Type: Theatre

Construction
- Opened: 1855
- Architects: James Green (1854–55); William Waddington (1888)

Website
- www.burnleymechanics.co.uk

Listed Building – Grade II*
- Official name: Burnley Mechanics
- Designated: 19 November 1997
- Reference no.: 1244905

The Burnley Mechanics is a theatre and former Mechanics' Institute in the market town of Burnley, Lancashire, England. It was built 1854–55 and converted to a theatre in 1979. Historic England has designated the theatre a Grade II* listed building.

== History ==
The Mechanics' Institute was built in 1854–55 to a design by Todmorden architect James Green. Charles Towneley officially opened the institute in 1855. It was a club for "reading and discussion by an 'earnest few'". As the town grew, the institute increasingly became a social and cultural community centre. Architect William Waddington enlarged the building in 1888. Burnley Borough Council bought the building in 1959 and leased it to companies for a variety of leisure purposes. In 1979 the interior was reconstructed as a theatre.

Burnley Mechanics was designated a Grade II* listed building by Historic England on 29 September 1977. The Grade II* designation—the second highest of the three grades—is for "particularly important buildings of more than special interest". It is described by Hartwell and Pevsner as "one of Burnley's best buildings". John Champness calls its façade "certainly the finest Classical façade in Burnley and among the very best of its date in the country".

== Architecture ==
Burnley Mechanics is built in the Palazzo style in sandstone ashlar. Green's original construction is on a rectangular plan with five bays at the front; it is on two storeys. The ground floor has Venetian-style windows with round, rusticated arches. Waddington's extension at the rear of the building is on a slightly lower level. Its design matches that of the rest of the building, but the newer windows have architraves with pilasters.

On the second floor, there are central windows flanked by Corinthian columns and pilasters. The entrances to the building have coupled Corinthian columns.

== See also ==
- Grade II* listed buildings in Lancashire
- Listed buildings in Burnley
