= St Mark's Church, Preston =

Coordinates: 53.7630°N 2.7190°W

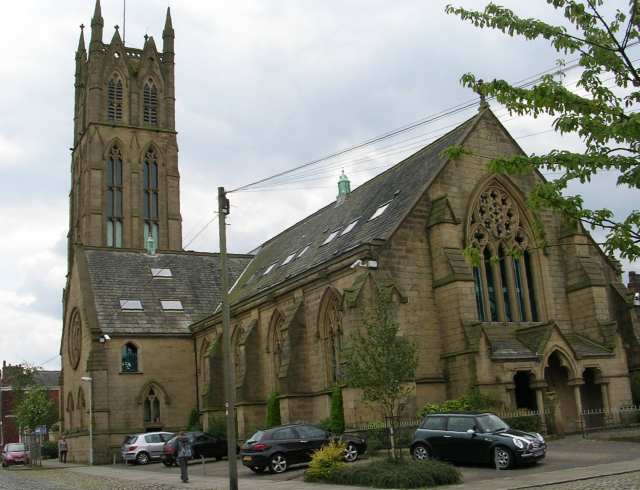
- St Mark's Church, Preston, from the northwest

- Location in Preston
- OS grid reference: SD 527 299
- Location: St Mark's Road, Preston, Lancashire
- Country: England
- Denomination: Anglican

Architecture
- Functional status: Redundant
- Heritage designation: Grade II*
- Designated: 27 September 1979
- Architect: E. G. Paley
- Architectural type: Church
- Style: Gothic Revival
- Groundbreaking: 1862
- Completed: 1870

Specifications
- Materials: Sandstone ashlar, slate roof

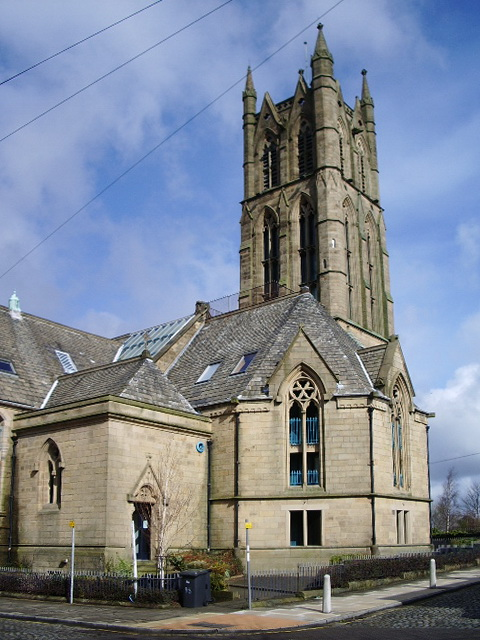
East end showing the tower

St Mark's Church is a redundant Anglican parish church in St Mark's Road, Preston, Lancashire, England. It is recorded in the National Heritage List for England as a designated Grade II* listed building. In 1993 its benefice was united with that of St Michael and All Angels, Ashton-on-Ribble.

== History ==
St Mark's was built in 1862–63 and designed by the Lancaster architect E. G. Paley. The cost of the church and the site was £6,594 (equivalent to £720,000 in 2025). The tower was added between 1868 and 1870. This is particularly tall because it was built to rival the very high steeple of the nearby Roman Catholic Church of St Walburge, which had been added to that church in 1867.^{[A]}

By the middle of the 20th century the population of St Mark's parish was declining, and the church was declared redundant on 1 December 1982. The building lay empty for over 10 years, and was then converted into residential flats. The altar and other furnishings were moved to St Michael and All Angels' Church, Ashton-on-Ribble, and installed in its Lady chapel, which was renamed St Mark's Chapel.

== Architecture ==
The former church is constructed in sandstone ashlar, and has a slate roof. Its architectural style is Decorated. The plan consists of a four-bay nave, north and south transepts, a chancel terminating in a three-sided apse, a west porch, and a tower at the northeast angle. At the west end is a three-bay porch flanked by buttresses terminating in gables. The porch is carried on plain columns with a gable above the central bay. Over the porch is a large five-light window. Along the sides of the nave are three-light windows separated by buttresses. The north and south walls of the transepts each contains two small two-light windows, with a wheel window above. Each side of the apse contains a tall two-light window rising into a gable.

The tower is tall, is in four unequal stages, and has a narrow octagonal stair turret at the southeast corner. In the third stage are two tall and narrow two-light windows on each side. On each side of the top stage are two two-light louvred bell openings rising into gables which break through the parapet. The parapet is pierced, and at the corners of the tower are pinnacles. Comparing the tower with the tall steeple of St Walburge's, the architectural historian Nikolaus Pevsner says that it "tries to complete with the steeple of St Walburge in prominence and to defeat it by solidity and sensibleness". In converting the church for residential purposes, balconies have been created and new windows have been added. The former school building has been converted into a design studio and occupied by Heckford Advertising Agency since 1990.

== See also ==
- Grade II* listed buildings in Lancashire
- Listed buildings in Preston, Lancashire
- List of ecclesiastical works by E. G. Paley

== Note ==
^{A} The spire of St Walburge's is the third highest, and tallest of any parish church, in England.
