= Waddow Hall =

Country house in Waddington, Lancashire, England

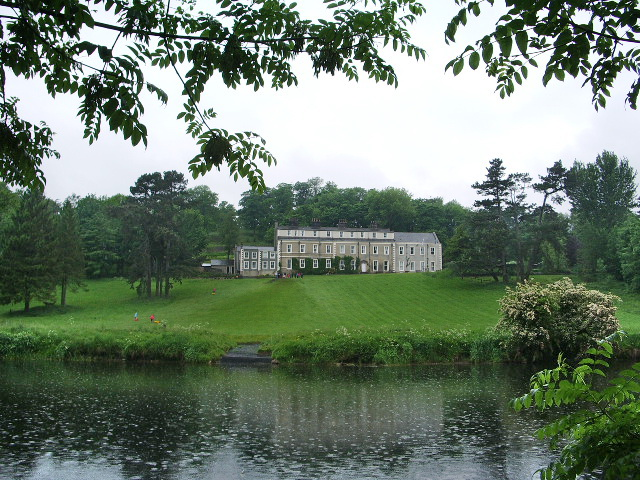
- Waddow Hall in 2008
- Interactive map of the Waddow Hall area

General information
- Location: Waddington, Lancashire, England
- Coordinates: 53.8797°N 2.4047°W
- Owner: Girlguiding UK (1928-2025); GT Foundation (2025-present)

Website
- waddowhall.com

Listed Building – Grade II
- Designated: 16 November 1954
- Reference no.: 1318094

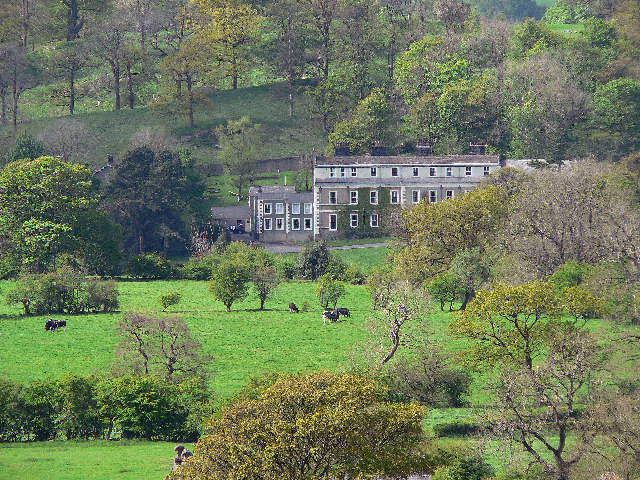
Waddow Hall overlooks the River Ribble

Waddow Hall is a 17th-century Grade II listed building within a 178-acre (72 ha) estate near Clitheroe, Lancashire, England which, between 1927 and 2023, served as a conference and activity centre for Girlguiding UK. Since April 2025 it has been owned by GT Foundation.

== History ==
The Waddow estate and the parish of Waddington were managed by Roger de Tempest of Bracewell, Lord of Waddington in 1267. Waddow Hall was built by the Tempest family during the Tudor period, and the estate and lands remained in the Tempest family until 1657, when Richard Tempest died in a debtors' prison.

Following Richard Tempest's death in prison, the land and buildings of the Waddow estate were acquired in 1658 by Christopher Wilkinson of Clitheroe, an out-bailiff and later a member of parliament. Wilkinson bequeathed the estate and buildings to his nephew John Weddell of Widdington in 1693 (rather than to his own son whom he suspected of popery) and the property remained in the Weddell family until 1778, when Thomas Weddell bequeathed them to Sir John Ramsden.

Waddow remained in the Ramsden family until the mid-1800s, when it was sold to William Garnett by Sir John's grandson, Sir John William Ramsden. The Girl Guides Association rented the estate between 1927 and 1928, using it as an activity centre, and purchased it for £9,000 from William Garnett's son on 16 October 1928.

During the Second World War the estate was lent to Lancashire County Council, and served as a children's isolation hospital.

In May 2023, Waddow Hall was listed for sale by Girlguiding. In April 2025 it was announced that ownership of the property had passed to GT Foundation, a UK registered and locally based charity. The centre would be run in collaboration with Waddow Hall Trust and other local adventure providers. The hall and grounds would remain a campsite and activity centre for use by the local community as well as Girlguiding members.

== Haunting ==
According to local folklore the estate is haunted by the ghost of Peg O'Nell, a former servant at the hall, who was murdered by the lady of the house. The legend suggests that Peg O'Nell was sent to fetch water from a well, when the mistress pushed her, causing her to fall in the well and die. O'Nell was rumoured to be with child whose father was the husband of the mistress.

A slightly differing version is told in Notes on the Folklore of the Northern Counties of England and the Borders by William Henderson. "Peg O'Nell was servant at Waddow Hall. Before starting out one morning to fetch water from the well, the girl offended her mistress the lady of Waddow, who thereupon expressed a wish that she might fall and break her neck. It was winter, and the ground was coated with ice. Peggy fell and the malediction was fulfilled. But she had her revenge. Waddow Hall now became possessed of an evil genius. When the chickens were stolen, the cow died, the sheep strayed or the children fell sick, all was due to Peg O Nell. And further she was inexorable in demanding every seven years a life to be quenched in the waters of the Ribble. When Peg's night, the closing night of the period came round unless a bird, a cat, or a dog was drowned in the stream, some human being was certain to fall a victim there. Accordingly on one anniversary of the fateful evening a young man rode down to adjourning inn on the way from Waddington to Clitheroe. No bridge then spanned the river at Brangerley; passengers crossed it at the ford, but it was so swollen on this occasion as to be unsafe. The young man was told of this, but he said he had business at Clitheroe and must go on. The host and hostess tried hard to dissuade him from his purpose, while the maid added "And it's Peg O Nell's night, and she has not had her life". The traveller laughed and set off but neither horse nor rider were reached the opposite bank."

The story is also told in the song "The Demon of the Well" by the folk-rock group Steeleye Span on their 2006 album Bloody Men. The song was researched and written by guitarist Ken Nicol.

In November 2004 the British paranormal television show Most Haunted broadcast an episode from Waddow Hall.

== See also ==
- Listed buildings in Waddington, Lancashire
