= Tower Hill Water Tower =

Listed structure in Lancashire, England

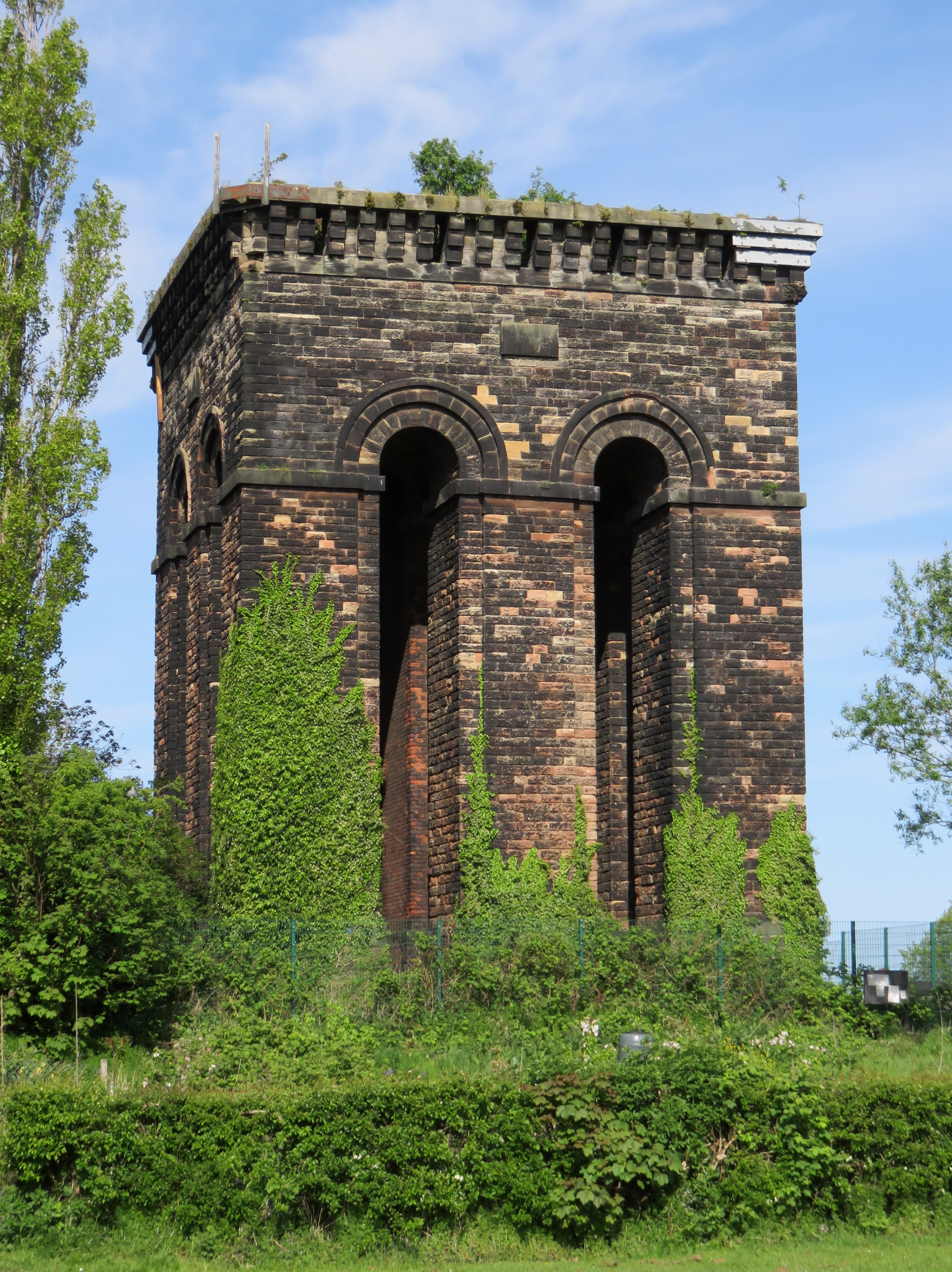
- The water tower in 2015

- Location within the Borough of West Lancashire

General information
- Type: Water tower
- Architectural style: Romanesque Revival
- Location: Ormskirk, Lancashire, England
- Coordinates: 53.56954°N 2.87242°W
- Construction started: 1853
- Completed: 1854
- Client: Ormskirk Local Board of Health

Height
- Height: 17 m (56 ft)

Listed Building – Grade II*
- Official name: Water tower on Tower Hill
- Designated: 22 March 1976
- Reference no.: 1197069

Tower Hill Water Tower is a disused water tower and local landmark in Ormskirk, Lancashire, England. Situated on the east side of Tower Hill, it was built between 1853–4 for Ormskirk Local Board of Health, and is reputed to be the oldest remaining water tower in the country. It was awarded Grade II* listed status in 1976, and is on the Heritage at Risk Register. The area immediately surrounding the tower has been used as allotments since the mid-20th century.

== Structure ==
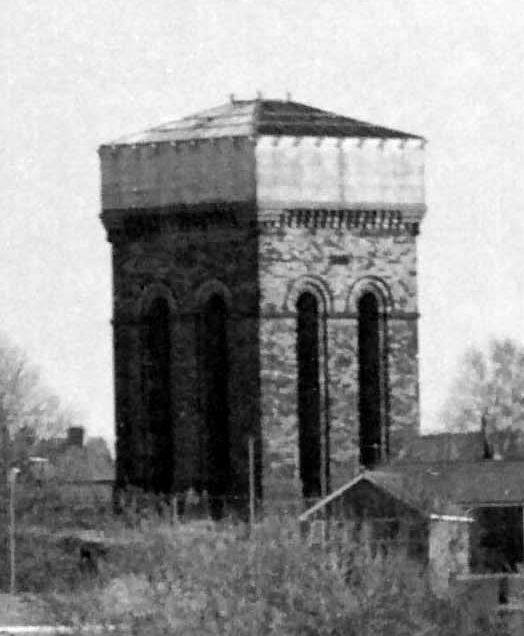
The tower in 1987, before the water tank was removed.

The tower is built in the Romanesque Revival style, constructed of coursed, squared sandstone, and arranged in a square plan. On each side are two narrow full-height Romanesque arches, all with stepped surrounds and arch-bands, and linked by an impost band. Above the arches is a plain frieze with carved grotesques at the corners, topped with machicolated corbelling. The stone is a pale red and mottled form of Ormskirk Sandstone, probably extracted from nearby Ruff Wood.

In its present state, the tower stands at a height of approximately 17 metres (56 ft). Originally, the stonework was surmounted by a metal water tank with a pitched slate-covered roof, which added an extra 6.2 metres (20 ft) to the height of the structure. Due to its poor condition, the tank was removed in the early 1990s.

== Proposed developments ==
Planning permission was granted in 1988 for the conversion of the tower into a single dwelling, though the scheme was never implemented. Subsequent applications to convert the tower into offices or an apartment block were either refused or withdrawn. An application for conversion into seven apartments was made in 2004, though this was also rejected, and an appeal against the decision was dismissed in April 2008.

Development of the site has met with opposition from local residents, and local Conservative councillor Adrian Owens was amongst critics of the 2004 application.

== See also ==
- Grade II* listed buildings in Lancashire
- Listed buildings in Ormskirk
- Jumbo Water Tower, a water tower of similar design in Colchester, Essex
