= Listed buildings in Bolton-le-Sands =

Bolton-le-Sands is a civil parish in Lancaster, Lancashire, England. It contains 36 listed buildings that are recorded in the National Heritage List for England. Of these, two are listed at Grade II*, the middle grade, and the others are at Grade II. Most of the listed buildings are houses, farmhouses and cottages dating from the 17th, 18th and early 19th centuries. The Lancaster Canal passes through the parish, and five bridges crossing it are listed. The other listed buildings include two churches, two schools, two public houses, a barn, a milestone, a cross base, and a pinfold.

== Key ==
Grade	Criteria
II*	Particularly important buildings of more than special interest
II	Buildings of national importance and special interest

== Buildings ==
Name and location	Photograph	Date	Notes	Grade
Holy Trinity Church; 54.10281°N 2.79177°W		Late 15th century	The church is also known as St Michael's Church. The oldest parts are the tower and the north arcade, with the nave built in 1813 and the chancel in 1847. It was restored in 1863–64 by E. G. Paley. It is built in stone with a slate roof, and consists of a nave, a north aisle, a chancel, a south porch, and a west tower. The tower has three stages and a battlemented parapet.	II*
Meeting Hall (former Grammar School); 54.10330°N 2.79172°W		1637	The original part is built in cobbles and limestone with sandstone dressings and a stone-slate roof. A sandstone wing was added at right angles in 1857. Both parts contain mullioned and transomed windows, and on the gable of the new part is a bellcote.	II
2 Town End; 54.10045°N 2.79578°W	—	1640	A house in pebbledashed stone with sandstone quoins and a slate roof. It has two storeys and is in two bays. The windows are mullioned, and inside is a bressumer.	II
Hawkshead Farmhouse; 54.10289°N 2.79000°W		1665	A house in sandstone and limestone rubble with sandstone dressings and a slate roof. It has 2 1/2 storeys and a central doorway. The windows are mullioned. Above the ground and first floor windows are continuous hood moulds that rise over the windows and the door.	II*
7 Town End; 54.10066°N 2.79534°W	—	1678	A pebbledashed stone house with a slate roof, in two storeys and a two-bay front. The ground floor windows are mullioned. The door jambs are moulded, and the lintel is battlemented and inscribed with initials and the date. There is also a plaque with the date 1899.	II
Red Bank Farmhouse; 54.10639°N 2.80919°W	—	1680	A pebbledashed stone farmhouse with a slate roof, in a T-shaped plan with two storeys. The door jambs are moulded, and the lintel is battlemented and inscribed with initials and the date. Some of the windows have retained their mullions.	II
Cobblers Lodge; 54.10248°N 2.78916°W	—	1686	This originated as two cottages, later combined to make a single house. It is in sandstone with a slate roof, in two storeys, with its rear facing the road. Some of the windows have retained their mullions.	II
End Cottage; 54.10848°N 2.80110°W	—	1687	A house built in cobbles with sandstone dressings and a modern tiled roof. It has two storeys, and the windows are mullioned.	II
Thwaite End Farmhouse; 54.11822°N 2.78335°W	—	1687	A pebbledashed stone farmhouse with a slate roof. It has two storeys with an attic, and a three-bay front. The door has moulded jambs and lintel, and the windows are sashes.	II
8 The Nook; 54.10264°N 2.78986°W		1701	A stone house with a slate roof in two storeys with an attic, and with a symmetrical three-bay front. The central doorcase is moulded with a shaped lintel containing the date. This is flanked on the ground floor by sash windows. and most of the other windows are mullioned.	II
6 and 7 Packet Lane; 54.10516°N 2.78951°W		1703	Originally one house, later divided into two. It is in pebbledashed stone with a slate roof and has two storeys. Some of the windows are mullioned and others are sashes, and there is a datestone on the front.	II
60 and 62 Main Road; 54.10314°N 2.79096°W	—	1745	A house and attached cottage, pebbledashed and in two storeys; the house has three bays and the cottage has two. Most of the windows are sashes.	II
9 The Nook; 54.10248°N 2.78852°W		Late 18th century	A pebbledashed farmhouse with sandstone dressings and a slate roof. It has two storeys and a symmetrical three-bay front. To the left is a lower single-bay wing. The windows are sashes.	II
Church Bridge (number 122); 54.10345°N 2.79205°W		1797	This bridge carries St Michael's Lane over the Lancaster Canal. It is built in blocks of gritstone, and consists of a single elliptical arch with projecting keystones, and solid parapets with rounded coping.	II
Turnpike Bridge (number 123); 54.10546°N 2.79018°W		1797	This bridge carries Main Road over the Lancaster Canal. It is built in blocks of gritstone, and consists of a single elliptical arch with projecting keystones, and solid parapets with rounded coping.	II
Chorley's Bridge (number 124); 54.10912°N 2.78715°W		1797	This is an accommodation bridge over the Lancaster Canal. It is built in blocks of gritstone, and consists of a single elliptical arch with projecting keystones, and solid parapets with rounded coping.	II
Cinder Ovens Bridge (number 125); 54.11255°N 2.78543°W		1797	The bridge carries Whin Grove over the Lancaster Canal. It is built in blocks of gritstone, and consists of a single elliptical arch with projecting keystones, and solid parapets with rounded coping.	II
Barker's Bridge (number 126); 54.11744°N 2.78410°W		1797	This is an accommodation bridge over the Lancaster Canal. It is built in blocks of gritstone, and consists of a single elliptical arch with projecting keystones, and solid parapets with rounded coping.	II
Darwen House; 54.10398°N 2.79064°W	—	1715	A stone house with sandstone dressings and a slate roof. It has two storeys and two bays. There are chamfered quoins, and plain surrounds to the windows and door. The windows are sashes.	II
Milestone; 54.11459°N 2.78875°W	—	c. 1800	The milestone is on the east side of the A6 road. It is in sandstone with cast iron plates, and has a triangular section. The base is inscribed with "Bolton", and the plates indicate the distances in miles to Burton and Lancaster.	II
13 Town End; 54.10058°N 2.79430°W	—	Early 19th century	A sandstone house with a slate roof, it has two storeys and a cellar, and a symmetrical three-bay front. The central doorway has pilasters and a cornice hood. There are also giant pilasters flanking the front, a plain frieze, and a cornice. The windows are sashes.	II
58 Main Road; 54.10330°N 2.79079°W	—	Early 19th century	A house in rendered stone with a slate roof. It has three bays and two storeys, and a lower extension to the left. The windows are sashes. The garden wall with a gateway containing a decorated lintel is included in the listing.	II
Blue Anchor Hotel; 54.10292°N 2.79108°W		Early 19th century	A sandstone public house with a slate roof, in two storeys and three bays. The doorway has a plain frieze and cornice and is flanked by Tuscan columns. The windows are sashes.	II
Boundary stone 54.09027°N 2.79787°W		Early 19th century (probable)	The stone marks the boundary with Slyne-with-Hest. It is in sandstone, and consists of a block with a triangular plan. Inscribed on the left face is "SLYNE", and on the other face is "BOLTON".	II
Morecambe Lodge; 54.09924°N 2.81030°W	—	Early 19th century	A pebbledashed house with sandstone dressings and a slate roof. It has two storeys and a symmetrical three-bay front. The central porch has two pilasters and two unfluted Greek Doric columns, and above the door is a fanlight. The ground floor windows are sashes.	II
Mount Pleasant Farmhouse; 54.11414°N 2.78031°W	—	Early 19th century	A rendered stone farmhouse with sandstone dressings and a slate roof. It has two storeys and a symmetrical three-bay front. The porch has pilasters and a dentilled cornice, and the windows are sashes.	II
Packet Boat Hotel; 54.10485°N 2.79015°W		Early 19th century	A public house in rendered stone with a slate roof. It has two storeys and is in two blocks of two bays each, those on the left at a lower level. The door and windows have plain surrounds.	II
St Michael's Cottage and Hillcroft; 54.10336°N 2.79213°W	—	Early 19th century	A pebbledashed house with stone dressings and a slate roof. It has two storeys with cellars at the rear, and a three-bay front. The windows are sashes, and there is a two-storey wooden bay window at the rear.	II
Waterloo Lodge; 54.10925°N 2.78795°W	—	Early 19th century	A pebbledashed house with brick dressings and a hipped slate roof in Gothick style. It is in 1 1/2 storeys and has a two-bay front. The windows have pointed arched heads, with some lights opening as casements.	II
Westbrook Lodge; 54.10949°N 2.78763°W	—	Early 19th century	A stuccoed house with sandstone dressings and a slate roof. It has two storeys and a symmetrical three-bay front. In the centre is a semicircular portico with two columns and two attached columns. This is flanked by bow windows, and in the upper floor the windows are sashes.	II
Bolton Lodge; 54.10378°N 2.79030°W		c. 1835	A house incorporating earlier material, and with two storeys and an attic. It has a slate roof, and is in two parts. The older part is roughcast with sandstone dressings and is in three bays. It has a porch with panelled pilasters, and a cornice. The newer part to the left has one bay. The windows are sashes.	II
Barn, Mount Pleasant Farm; 54.11413°N 2.77975°W	—	1836	The barn is in sandstone with a slate roof. It is built on a slope and has two storeys on its west side, which contains a variety of openings and a decorative plaque incorporating the date. On the gable ends are ventilation slits and owl holes, and each gable has an apex finial.	II
Crosshills School; 54.10285°N 2.79076°W		1849	The school is in sandstone with a slate roof, and consists of a block with a cross-wing on the left. In the angle is a gabled porch with shaped bargeboards. The windows are mullioned and transomed. Above the window in the gable of the cross-wing is a carved and inscribed stone tablet.	II
St Mary's Church; 54.10326°N 2.79054°W		1882–84	A Roman Catholic church designed by E. Simpson in sandstone with a slate roof. It consists of a tall nave with a clerestory, low aisles, a chancel, and a slim southwest tower containing a porch. The tower is buttressed, square at the base and broached to form an octagon with a pyramidal roof. The windows on the sides of the church are lancets, and the west window has Decorated tracery.	II
Cross base 54.10269°N 2.79166°W	—	Uncertain	The cross base is in sandstone and consists of a square base with two steps. On top of this is a square block with rounded corners and a socket that carries a 20th-century cross.	II
Pinfold; 54.10790°N 2.78934°W	—	Uncertain	This consists of a semicircular stone wall with triangular copings. It has been reduced in size due to road widening.	II
