= Church of St George the Martyr, Preston =

Coordinates: 53.7593°N 2.7026°W

- Church of St George the Martyr, Preston
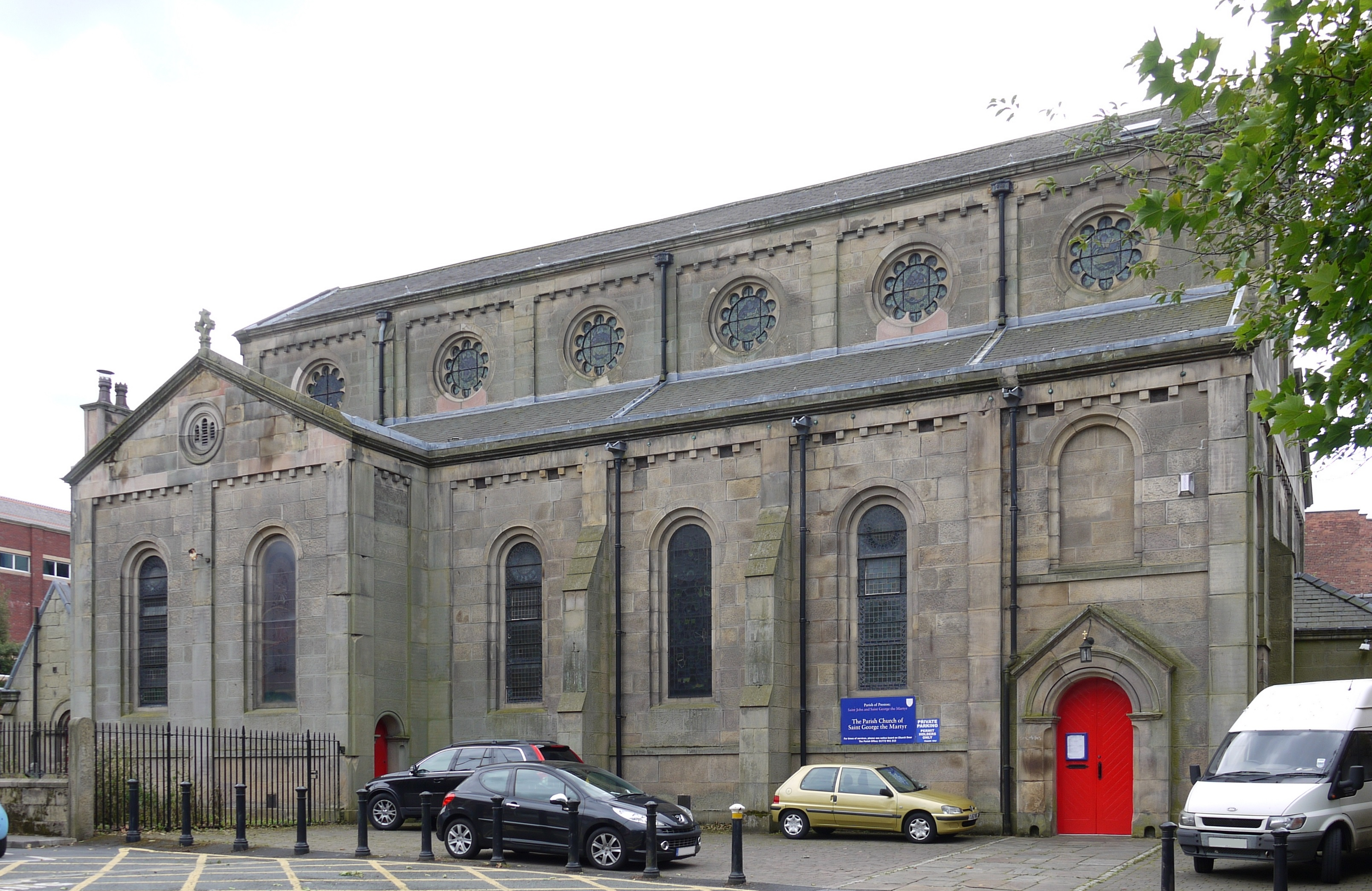

- Location in Preston
- OS grid reference: SD 538,294
- Location: George's Road, Preston, Lancashire
- Country: England
- Denomination: Anglican
- Churchmanship: Traditional Catholic
- Website: St George the Martyr, Preston

History
- Status: Parish church
- Dedication: Saint George

Architecture
- Functional status: Active
- Heritage designation: Grade II*
- Designated: 27 September 1979
- Architect: Edmund Sharpe (chancel)
- Architectural type: Church
- Style: Romanesque
- Groundbreaking: 1725
- Completed: 1848; 178 years ago

Specifications
- Materials: Sandstone ashlar Slate roofs

Administration
- Province: York
- Diocese: Blackburn
- Archdeaconry: Lancaster
- Deanery: Preston
- Parish: Preston St John and St George the Martyr

Clergy
- Vicar: Fr David Craven SSC

The Church of St George the Martyr is in George's Road, off Lune St, Preston, Lancashire, England. It is an active Anglican parish church in the deanery of Preston, the archdeaconry of Lancaster, and the diocese of Blackburn. Its benefice is united with that of St John, Preston. The church is recorded in the National Heritage List for England as a designated Grade II* listed building.

== History ==
The church was built in 1725–26 as a chapel of ease to St John's Church, Preston, and was enlarged in 1799, when it is likely that the transepts were added. The church was encased in stone in 1843. In the following year, St George's became a parish in its own right. In 1848 the chancel, designed by the Lancaster architect Edmund Sharpe, was added. The nave was raised and remodelled by Garlick, Park and Sykes in 1884–85. A gallery was added in the south transept during the 20th century.

== Architecture ==
=== Exterior ===
As originally designed, the church was in Georgian style, but subsequent additions and alterations have transformed it into Romanesque style. It is constructed in sandstone ashlar, with slate roofs. Its plan consists of a nave with a clerestory, north and south aisles, north and south transepts, and a chancel with an apse. At the west end of the south aisle is a three-stage tower incorporating a porch, and at the west end of the church is a small baptistry. All the windows are round-headed, other than a west wheel window in the baptistry, and circular openings in the clerestory. The doorway in the bottom stage of the tower is gabled, the middle stage contains pilasters, a single window, and a corbel table. In the top stage are louvred bell openings and another corbel table. The parapet has a pinnacle at each corner, and a pierced roundel.

=== Interior ===
Inside the church are six-bay arcades, consisting of pointed arches carried on circular piers. The font is a circular marble tub dated 1865. The organ case was painted by Shrigley and Hunt. On the walls is a scheme of paintings by Carl Almquist of Shrigley and Hunt, executed between 1885 and 1914. The stained glass in the windows was also designed by Almquist. In the church are 19th-century monuments. The three-manual pipe organ was built in 1865 by Henry Willis, and opened by the Liverpool organist W. T. Best. Initially sited in the west gallery, it was moved to its present position in the north transept by the same firm in 1883. The organ was rebuilt in 1973 by J. W. Walker & Sons Ltd.

== See also ==
- Grade II* listed buildings in Lancashire
- Listed buildings in Preston, Lancashire
- List of architectural works by Edmund Sharpe
