= St Mary's Church, Newchurch in Pendle =

St Mary's Church
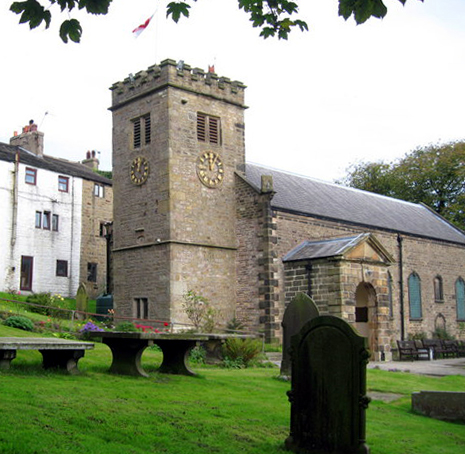
- St Mary's Church from the southwest

- Location in Pendle Borough Location in the Forest of Pendle AONB
- 53.8503°N 2.2705°W
- OS grid reference: SD 82304 39373
- Location: Newchurch in Pendle, Lancashire
- Country: England
- Denomination: Anglican
- Website: St Mary's, Newchurch in Pendle

History
- Status: Parish church

Architecture
- Functional status: Active
- Heritage designation: Grade II*
- Designated: 29 January 1988
- Architectural type: Church
- Style: Gothic

Specifications
- Capacity: 150
- Materials: Hammer-dressed stone with ashlar to the porch. Slate roof

Administration
- Province: York
- Diocese: Blackburn
- Archdeaconry: Blackburn
- Deanery: Pendle
- Parish: Newchurch in Pendle

Clergy
- Vicar: Revd Paul Payton (interim)

St Mary's Church is in the village of Newchurch in Pendle, Lancashire, England. The church is recorded in the National Heritage List for England as a designated Grade II* listed building. It is active Anglican parish church in the diocese of Blackburn, the archdeaconry of Blackburn and the deanery of Pendle. Its benefice is combined with that of St Thomas', Barrowford.

== History ==
A chapel of ease was on the site of the present church in 1250. A later chapel was dedicated by the Rt Revd John Bird, Bishop of Chester, on 1 October 1544. It is not known when the tower was built, but it was restored in 1653, and again in 1712. The rest of the building dates from around 1740. In 1815 it was decided to raise to walls of the church to accommodate a gallery. This was built between 1816 and 1817 at a cost of £352 (equivalent to £26,000 in 2025). In 1830 the church bell was purchased. Restorations took place in 1850 and 1902.

== Architecture ==
=== Exterior ===
The church is built in hammer-dressed stone, with ashlar to the porch and a slate roof. Its plan consists of a west tower, a nave with a north aisle, a chancel, and a south porch. At the east end of the aisle is a Lady Chapel and to the east of this is the vicar's vestry. The choir vestry is at the west end of the aisle. The tower is in two stages with a string course between. In the second stage is a clock face with mullioned belfry windows above it. The summit is embattled. On the south and north front of the church are four windows with elliptical heads. At the east end is a Venetian window with a keystone. On the south front is blocked priest's door. On the southwest corner of the nave roof is a sundial dated 1718. On the west face of the tower is a carving which resembles a filled-in window above which is a dripstone. This is said to resemble the all-seeing "Eye of God".

=== Interior ===
In the porch is a memorial containing the names of the men from the parish who lost their lives in the World Wars together with the names of those who served in the armed forces in these wars. Inside the church, to the left of the entrance, are the churchwardens' seats and a board containing the names of the districts into which the parish was divided. Inside the church is a north arcade of Doric columns and wooden panelled north and west galleries. The chandelier dates from 1756.

=== Organ ===
The organ in the west gallery was made by Wordsworth and Company of Leeds, and was installed in 1890 at a cost of £550. It was refurbished in 1990 and then completely rebuilt in 2000 by Harrison & Harrison of Durham at a cost of over £75,000.

== External features ==
In the churchyard are two Grade II listed features. The Parker tomb is a table tomb dated 1691. The Nutter headstone probably dates from 1694. It is possible that the members of the family inscribed on this headstone were relatives of Alice Nutter, one of the women accused in the Pendle witch trials. Also in the churchyard are the war graves of two soldiers and a Royal Flying Corps officer of World War I.

== Present activities ==
St Mary's continues to be an active parish church, holding regular services. In addition, it is one of the few remaining churches to hold an annual rushbearing service in August.

== See also ==
- Grade II* listed buildings in Lancashire
- Listed buildings in Goldshaw Booth
