= Holy Trinity Church, Bolton-le-Sands =

Coordinates: 54.1028°N 2.7917°W

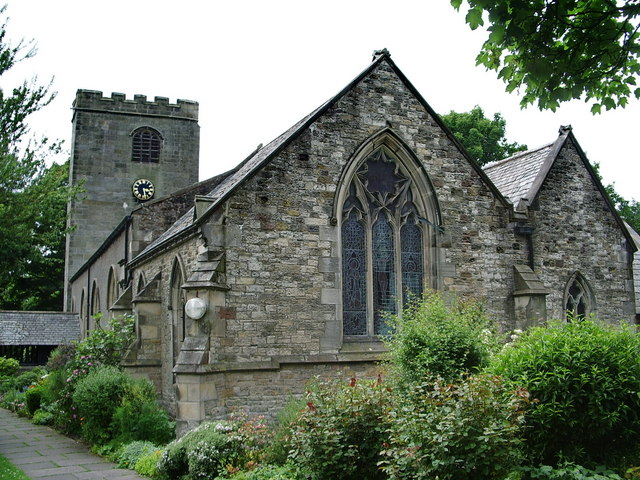
- Holy Trinity Church, Bolton-le-Sands, from the southeast

- Location in the City of Lancaster district
- OS grid reference: SD 483,677
- Location: Bolton-le-Sands, Lancashire
- Country: England
- Denomination: Anglican
- Website: https://bolton-le-sands.org.uk/

History
- Former name(s): St Michael's Church, Bolton-le-Sands
- Status: Parish church
- Dedication: Holy Trinity, formerly Saint Michael

Architecture
- Functional status: Active
- Heritage designation: Grade II*
- Designated: 2 May 1968
- Architect(s): Sharpe and Paley (chancel, pulpit and reading desk); E. G. Paley (restoration); Paley and Austin (1881 alterations)
- Architectural type: Church
- Style: Gothic, Gothic Revival

Specifications
- Materials: Stone, slate roofs

Administration
- Province: York
- Diocese: Blackburn
- Archdeaconry: Lancaster
- Deanery: Tunstall
- Parish: Bolton-le-Sands

Clergy
- Vicar: Rev. Peter Hamborg

Holy Trinity Church (formerly St Michael's Church), is in the village of Bolton-le-Sands, Lancashire, England. It is an active Anglican parish church in the deanery of Tunstall, the archdeaconry of Lancaster, and the diocese of Blackburn. Its benefice is united with that of St Mark, Nether Kellet. The church is recorded in the National Heritage List for England as a designated Grade II* listed building.

== History ==
A church has been on the site since before 1094. The oldest parts of the present church are the tower and the north arcade, which date from the late 15th century. The nave was built in 1813. In 1847 the Lancaster architectural practice of Sharpe and Paley rebuilt the chancel, and in 1851 added a pulpit and a reading desk. The church was restored in 1863–64 by E. G. Paley (by this time Sharpe had retired from the practice). In 1881 the practice, now Paley and Austin, carried out further alterations, which included widening the north aisle, adding a vestry, a porch, a pulpit, and a font, lowering the floor, removing the gallery, opening the tower arch, replacing windows, reseating the church to accommodate 450 people, and retiling and refitting the chancel.

== Architecture ==
=== Exterior ===
The church is constructed in rubble with slate roofs. The tower is in ashlar sandstone, and the south wall of the nave is pebbledashed. Its plan consists of a nave, a north aisle, a south porch, a chancel and a west tower. The tower is in three stages. In the bottom stage is a west door and a three-light window. This window is flanked by niches with pinnacles. The bell openings also have three lights. The tower is supported by diagonal buttresses, and on its summit is a battlemented parapet. At its southwest is a projection for stairs. The windows in the south nave wall contain Perpendicular tracery. The chancel is in Early English style.

=== Interior ===
The arcade is in five bays running between the nave and chancel, and the north aisle. It is supported by octagonal piers, other than the second pier from the east, which is rectangular. The nave has a hammerbeam roof, and the chancel roof is scissor-braced. Between the chancel and the aisle is a sandstone memorial to the memory of a man who died in 1642 with the inscription "It is supposed that he lived above 100 yeares". Elsewhere there are 19th-century monuments in Classical style, and brasses dated 1692 and 1872. The reredos is in alabaster and dates from 1897. The stained glass in the west window dates from 1891. It depicts archangels, was designed by Carl Almquist, and made by Shrigley and Hunt. The glass in the chancel windows was designed by William Wailes. Also in the church are two pieces of carved Anglo-Saxon stone dating from the 10th century.

== External features ==
In the churchyard to the south of the church is a square sandstone cross base with two steps. Its age is not known. It is surmounted by a later square block and a 20th-century cross. The churchyard also contains the war graves of two British and one Canadian soldier of World War I.

== See also ==
- Grade II* listed buildings in Lancashire
- Listed buildings in Bolton-le-Sands
- List of works by Sharpe and Paley
- List of ecclesiastical works by E. G. Paley
- List of ecclesiastical works by Paley and Austin
