= Simonswood Hall =

Country house in Lancashire, England

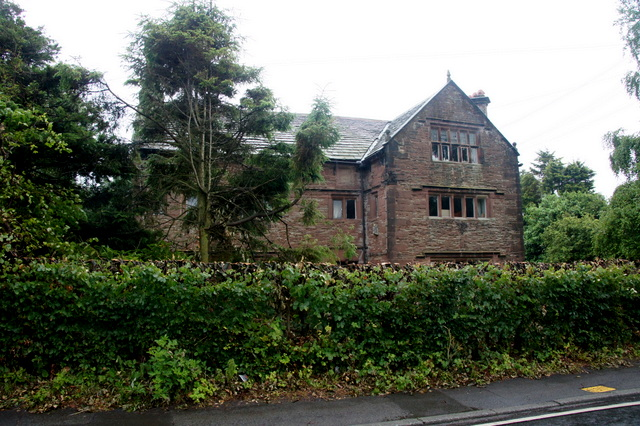
- The hall in 2015

- Location within Lancashire

General information
- Type: Country house
- Location: Simonswood, West Lancashire, Lancashire, England
- Coordinates: 53.50360°N 2.88035°W
- Year built: 1687
- Renovated: 1880s (extended)

Listed Building – Grade II*
- Official name: Simonswood Hall (Note: The Historic England official list entry states "Simmonswood Hall", but this may be a typographical error.)
- Designated: 11 October 1968
- Reference no.: 1343471

Simonswood Hall is a country house in the civil parish of Simonswood in the West Lancashire district of Lancashire, England. It was built in 1687 and thoroughly restored in the 1880s. The house is constructed in sandstone with a stone-slate roof. There are two storeys with an attic, and three bays, the third bay being a cross wing projecting under a gable. On the left return is a single-storey lean-to extension. The doorway in the central bay has a rusticated surround, with voussoirs and a keystone. There is one window that is transomed, all the others being mullioned; all the windows have hood moulds. The house also has quoins and finials on the gables, which are coped. The house is recorded in the National Heritage List for England as a designated Grade II* listed building.

== See also ==
- Grade II* listed buildings in Lancashire
