= Listed buildings in Goldshaw Booth =

Goldshaw Booth is a civil parish in Pendle, Lancashire, England. It contains 14 listed buildings that are recorded in the National Heritage List for England. Of these, two are at Grade II*, the middle grade, and the others are at Grade II, the lowest grade. The parish contains the village of Newchurch in Pendle and is otherwise rural. Almost all the listed buildings in the parish are houses, farmhouses, farm buildings, and associated structures. The other listed buildings are a church and two memorials in the churchyard.

== Key ==
Grade	Criteria
II*	Particularly important buildings of more than special interest
II	Buildings of national importance and special interest

== Buildings ==
Name and location	Photograph	Date	Notes	Grade
Sabden Great Hall; 53.84107°N 2.28936°W		1577	The oldest part of the house is the east wing, the main range and west wing dating from the 17th century. It is in freestone with a plinth and quoins, and is in two storeys. The windows are mullioned or mullioned and transomed. On the front is a chamfered doorway, and at the rear is a two-storey porch, its entrance altered to form a window.	II*
Lower Houses Farmhouse; 53.83714°N 2.28984°W		17th century (or earlier)	A stone house with a stone-slate roof in two storeys, consisting of a hall with a cross wing. In the angle is a two-storey porch with a Tudor arched entrance and doorway, and containing benches. There is another doorway on the left return with a chamfered surround. The windows are mullioned.	II
Green Top Farmhouse; 53.84177°N 2.29011°W	—	17th century	The former farmhouse is in freestone with a stone-slate roof, and has two storeys. Some of the windows are mullioned, and others have a single light. On the front is a blocked doorway.	II
St Mary's Church; 53.85027°N 2.27056°W		1653	The oldest part of the church is the tower, and most of the rest dates from 1740. Alterations were made in the 19th century. The church is in stone with a slate roof, and consists of a nave, a north aisle, a chancel, a south porch, and a west tower. The tower has two stages, with clock faces, and an embattled parapet. On the sides of the church are windows with elliptical heads, and at the east end is a Venetian window.	II*
Stainscomb Farmhouse; 53.84015°N 2.30950°W	—	Late 17th century	A house in gritstone with a stone-slate roof and large quoins. There are two storeys, two bays, and outshuts at the rear. On the front is a two-storey porch with a chamfered quoined square-headed doorway, and containing stone benches. The windows are mullioned.	II
Parker tomb 53.85016°N 2.27048°W	—	1691	The tomb is in the churchyard of St Mary's Church. It is in stone and consists of a slab rained on square legs. This is moulded as an arch, and has angels carved in the spandrels, and an inscription.	II
Nutter headstone 53.85023°N 2.27037°W	—	1694 (probable)	The headstone is in the churchyard of St Mary's Church. It consists of a plain stone slab inscribed with names and dates of members of the Nutter family.	II
Well Head Farmhouse and Barn; 53.84847°N 2.28118°W		Late 17th to early 18th century	The house and barn are in stone with a stone-slate roof. The house has two storeys, and a central gabled porch with a plain doorway. The windows are mullioned, except for one sash window. The barn to the right has windows and a doorway.	II
Saddles Farmhouse; 53.84694°N 2.28584°W	—	1714	A stone house with a slate roof. In the centre is a single-storey porch with a stone-slate roof, a doorway with a plain surround, and a datestone. The windows are mullioned, but some mullions have been lost.	II
Vicarage; 53.84998°N 2.27102°W		Mid 18th century	A stone house with quoins and a stone-slate roof. It has two storeys, a symmetrical five-bay front, and an extension to the left. The windows are sashes, and there is a rear stair window with a round head and keystone. The doorway has a broken pediment and a rusticated surround.	II
Mounting steps 53.84972°N 2.27126°W	—	18th century (possible)	The mounting block is by the boundary wall of the vicarage. It is in stone, about 4 feet (1.2 m) high, and consists of four steps leading up to a platform.	II
16–20 Newchurch Street; 53.85159°N 2.27018°W	—	Mid to late 18th century	Originally two houses, later divided into three dwellings, the building is in stone with a stone-slate roof, and has two storeys. Nos 16 and 18 have mullioned windows and a gabled porch. No 20 is set back and has an L-shaped plan. It contains one small lunette window, the other windows being mullioned or sashes.	II
Tynedale Farmhouse; 53.84127°N 2.27434°W		Late 18th century	A stone house with a stone-slate roof in two storeys. The windows are mullioned and contain sashes. The doorway has a plain surround.	II
22 Newchurch Street; 53.85177°N 2.27014°W	—	Late 18th to early 19th century	A stone cottage with a stone-slate roof in two storeys. It contains a doorway with a plain surround, and a large sash window.	II

== Notes and references ==
Notes

Citations

Sources

- Hartwell, Clare; Pevsner, Nikolaus (2009) [1969], Lancashire: North, The Buildings of England, New Haven and London: Yale University Press, ISBN 978-0-300-12667-9
- Historic England, "Sabden Great Hall, Goldshaw Booth (1361707)", National Heritage List for England
- Historic England, "Lower Houses Farmhouse, Goldshaw Booth (1243418)", National Heritage List for England
- Historic England, "Green Top Farmhouse, Goldshaw Booth (1243413)", National Heritage List for England
- Historic England, "Church of St Mary, Newchurch in Pendle, Goldshaw Booth (1361745)", National Heritage List for England
- Historic England, "Stainscomb Farmhouse, Goldshaw Booth (1361729)", National Heritage List for England
- Historic England, "Parker tomb 5 metres southeast of porch of Church of St Mary, Goldshaw Booth (1243399)", National Heritage List for England
- Historic England, "Nutter headstone 2 metres south of Church of St Mary, Goldshaw Booth (1073362)", National Heritage List for England
- Historic England, "Well Head Farmhouse and Barn adjoining to the north east, Goldshaw Booth (1361709)", National Heritage List for England
- Historic England, "Saddles Farmhouse, Goldshaw Booth (1243434)", National Heritage List for England
- Historic England, "The Vicarage, Goldshaw Booth (1272888)", National Heritage List for England
- Historic England, "Mounting steps adjoining boundary wall to southwest of St Mary's Vicarage, Goldshaw Booth (1272889)", National Heritage List for England
- Historic England, "Nos 16, 18 and 20 Newchurch Street, Goldshaw Booth (1073363)", National Heritage List for England
- Historic England, "Tynedale Farmhouse, Goldshaw Booth (1073364)", National Heritage List for England
- Historic England, "No 22 Newchurch Street, Goldshaw Booth (1361708)", National Heritage List for England
- Historic England, Listed Buildings
