= St Helen's Church, Waddington =

Coordinates: 53.8899°N 2.4144°W

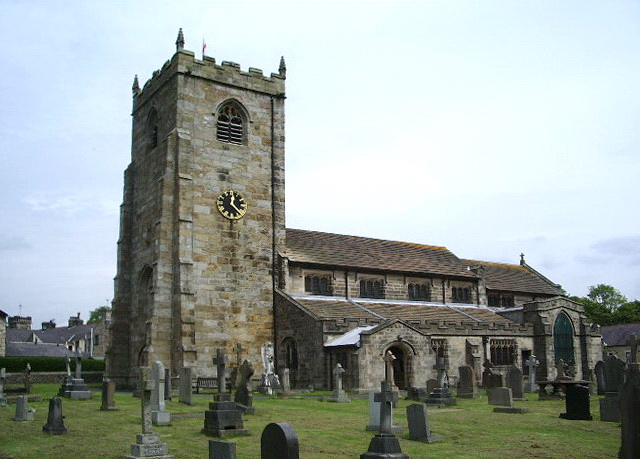
- St Helen's Church, Waddington, from the southwest

- Location in the Borough of Ribble Valley
- OS grid reference: SD 729,438
- Location: Waddington, Lancashire
- Country: England
- Denomination: Anglican
- Website: St Helen, Waddington

History
- Status: Parish church
- Dedication: Saint Helen

Architecture
- Functional status: Active
- Heritage designation: Grade II*
- Designated: 16 November 1964
- Architect: Austin and Paley
- Architectural type: Church
- Style: Gothic, Gothic Revival
- Completed: 1901

Specifications
- Materials: Sandstone, stone slate roofs

Administration
- Province: York
- Diocese: Blackburn
- Archdeaconry: Blackburn
- Deanery: Whalley
- Parish: Waddington

Clergy
- Vicar: Revd Christopher Wood

St Helen's Church is in the village of Waddington, Lancashire, England. It is an active Anglican parish church in the deanery of Whalley, the archdeaconry of Blackburn, and the Diocese of Blackburn. Its benefice is united with that of St Catherine, West Bradford. The church is recorded in the National Heritage List for England as a designated Grade II* listed building.

== History ==
The church dates from about 1500, but only the tower remains from that time. The nave and chancel were rebuilt in 1898–1901 by the Lancaster architects Austin and Paley.

== Architecture ==
St Helen's is constructed in sandstone with stone slate roofs. Its plan consists of a nave with a clerestory, north and south aisles, a south porch, short north and south transepts, a lower chancel, and a west tower. The tower is in three stages with a west doorway, above which is a three-light window. The bell openings have two lights, and the parapet is embattled, with pinnacles and gargoyles at the corners. The parapets of the aisles are also embattled. The east window of the chancel has five lights.

Inside the church are open timber roofs. The five-bay arcades have pointed arches carried on octagonal piers. Above the inner arch of the west door are nine carved heads. The octagonal sandstone font dates from the 16th-century, and has a bowl carved with the instruments of the Passion. In the west window of the tower is stained glass dating from the 19th century, depicting St Helen flanked by the Saxon chieftain Wadda, and King Henry VI. There is a ring of six bells, all cast in 1972 by John Taylor & Co.

== See also ==
- Grade II* listed buildings in Lancashire
- List of ecclesiastical works by Austin and Paley (1895–1914)
