= Simonswood =

Civil parish in Lancashire, England

Coordinates: 53.505°N 2.878°W

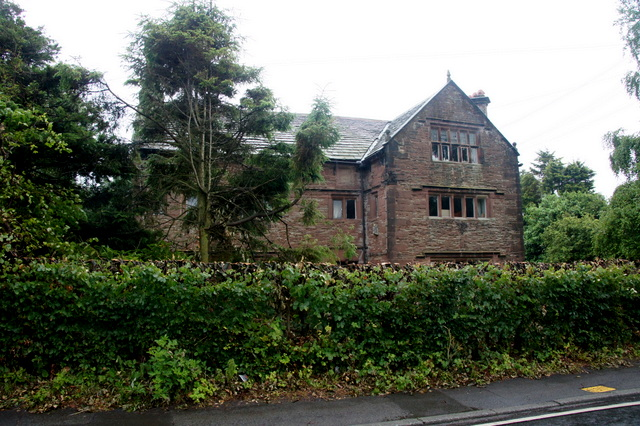
- Simonswood Hall

- Location in West Lancashire Location within Lancashire
- Population: 151 (2011 census)
- OS grid reference: SD417013
- Civil parish: Simonswood
- District: West Lancashire
- Shire county: Lancashire
- Region: North West
- Country: England
- Sovereign state: United Kingdom
- Post town: LIVERPOOL
- Postcode district: L33
- Dialling code: 0151
- Police: Lancashire
- Fire: Lancashire
- Ambulance: North West
- UK Parliament: West Lancashire

Simonswood is a civil parish in the West Lancashire district of Lancashire, England. At the 2001 census, the population was 130, increasing to 151 by the 2011 census.

It was originally a township associated with the parish of Walton on the Hill, and became a separate civil parish in 1866. From 1894 to 1974 it formed part of the West Lancashire Rural District. On 1 April 1974, under the Local Government Act 1972, it was transferred to the Metropolitan Borough of Knowsley in the new metropolitan county of Merseyside. The Simonswood parish was transferred back to Lancashire (to the West Lancashire district), on 1 April 1994. At the time of this transfer the area of the parish was 830 hectares (8.3 km^{2}; 3.2 sq mi), and the population was 150.

There is one listed building in the parish, Simonswood Hall, which is listed at Grade II*.
