= Bolton-le-Sands =

Village in Lancashire, England

Coordinates: 54.104°N 2.791°W

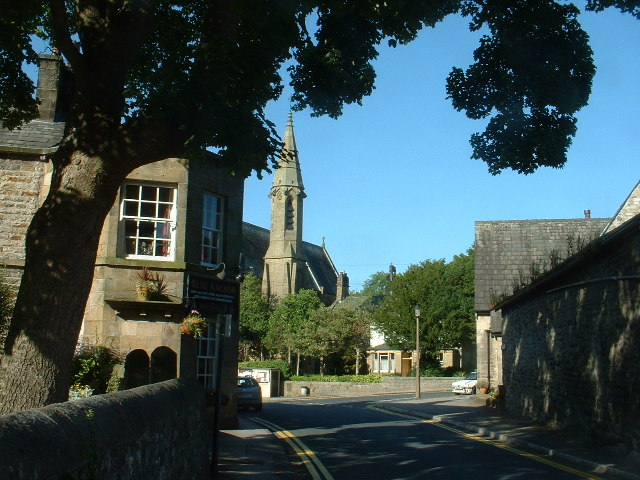

- Location in the City of Lancaster district Location on Morecambe Bay Location within Lancashire
- Population: 4,199 (2021)
- OS grid reference: SD483678
- Civil parish: Bolton-le-Sands
- District: Lancaster
- Shire county: Lancashire
- Region: North West
- Country: England
- Sovereign state: United Kingdom
- Post town: CARNFORTH
- Postcode district: LA5
- Dialling code: 01524
- Police: Lancashire
- Fire: Lancashire
- Ambulance: North West
- UK Parliament: Morecambe and Lunesdale
- Website: Parish Council

Bolton-le-Sands is a large village and civil parish of the City of Lancaster in Lancashire, England. The parish had a population of 4,098 recorded in the 2001 census, increasing to 4,127 at the 2011 Census.

== History ==
Referred to as Bodeltone in the Domesday book, the village was known as Bolton until the arrival of the railways, when the name was changed to Bolton-le-Sands to differentiate from similarly named towns on the same line, such as Bolton which was then a part of Lancashire and called Bolton-le-Moors.

The oldest church in the village, founded prior to 1094, is the Church of England Holy Trinity church, originally dedicated to St Michael, which is grade II* listed. The oldest part of the current building is the tower, supposed to have been built around 1500. The nave and chancel date from the 19th century. The other churches are the grade II listed Roman Catholic St Mary of the Angels and the Christ Church United Reformed Church.

The Lancaster Canal, built in the 1790s, is a major feature of the village. Also passing through the village is the A6 and the West Coast Main Line, although its railway station closed in 1969.

The village includes three pubs: The Royal Hotel, situated on the A6, The Packet Boat (closed in 2015), and the Blue Anchor are both within the centre of the village, along the main street.

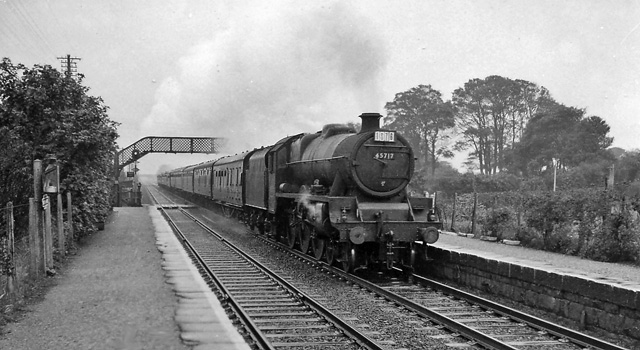
Until 1969, Bolton-le-Sands railway station was on the West Coast Main Line.

The village has one school, Bolton-le-Sands Church of England Primary School, with 320 pupils from the ages of 4 to 11 in a modern school building. It has received a 2022 Ofsted report with GOOD in all areas.

The school is a successor to the old Boys' Free Grammar School, which dates from 1657, with the 19th century school building still used for community education. The school building was also home to the Bolton-le-Sands library until 1973, when the library was moved into a newly built site in the village centre.

The library was controversially closed in Autumn 2016 following a renovation in 2015 costing a reported £283,000, in a cost-cutting measure by Lancashire County Council. The library building was put up for sale, after no public sector community group was found to run the library. The library was re-opened in December 2017, with commitment by the Lancashire City Council to keep it as vital part of the community.

The village has a very active scout group that meets in the scout hut on the village playing fields. It has three sections; Beavers, Cubs and Scouts.

== Governance ==
An electoral ward with the same name exists. This ward stretches beyond the confines of the parish with a total population taken at the 2011 census of 4,255.

== Arms ==
Coat of arms of Bolton-le-Sands

Notes
Granted 24 August 1979.
Crest
a mount Vert thereon between two roses Gules barbed seeded stalked and leaved issuant Proper in front of a long cross pommy Gules an open book Argent leathered Gules edged Or the pages illuminated that to the dexter inscribed with a T and that to the sinister with an A in Black Letter Proper.
Torse
A wreath Argent and Azure.
Escutcheon
Per fess Azure and Vert on a fess Or between in chief two escallops Argent and in base a mitre affronty the infulae entwining two croziers heads inward in pile all Or a Saxon crown between two lions' heads erased Gules.
Motto
Per Arenas Per Agros (Through Sands Through Fields)

== See also ==
- Listed buildings in Bolton-le-Sands
