= Mary Augusta Wakefield =

British composer (1853–1910)

Mary Augusta Wakefield (19 August 1853 – 16 September 1910) was a British composer, contralto, festival organiser, and writer.

== Biography ==
=== Early life ===
Wakefield was born in Kendal, where her paternal ancestors had been members of the Quaker community before converting to Anglicanism. Her parents William Henry Wakefield and Augusta Hagarty Wakefield had four sons (including the cricketer William Wakefield) and two other daughters. Her mother was from an Irish-American background. In the 1860s her father took over the family business, which included a bank and a gunpowder mill. In 1868, he built Sedgwick House a few miles outside Kendal. (The family gunpowder mill started in Sedgwick in the 18th century, but production had moved to a new site in 1850).

As a child, Wakefield learned traditional border folksongs from her nurses, which she later included in her collection Northern Songs. As a teenager she was sent to a finishing school in Brighton. She studied music in London with Alberto Randegger and George Henschel, and in Rome with Giovanni Sgambati.

=== Later life ===
Wakefield corresponded with and visited many musicians and writers, including Lucy Broadwood, J. A. Fuller Maitland, Herbert Oakeley, John Ruskin, John Stainer, and Maude Valérie White. Author Vernon Lee dedicated her short ghost story A Wicked Voice to Wakefield in 1887.

Wakefield suffered from neuritis and rheumatic problems from 1905 onwards and had poor health until she died on 16 February 1910. She is buried alongside her parents in the churchyard of St Thomas' Church, Crosscrake; her coffin was carried by the conductors of several choirs from the Festival, and members of those choirs sang in the funeral service.

== Music ==
Wakefield was an early member of the Folk Song Society (now the English Folk Dance and Song Society). She presented recitals throughout England, sometimes with Maude Valerie White. While in Rome in the 1880s, she socialised with composers Theo Marzials and Edvard Grieg. Grieg coached her on singing his songs and gave her an album of his compositions with this inscription: "Mary Wakefield with my best thanks for her beautiful songs. Edward Grieg. Roma. 1887."

Wakefield's musical compositions included:

=== Vocal music ===
- After Years
- Beyond All, Thine
- Bunch of Cowslips
- Children are Singing
- Courting Days
- For Love's Sake Only
- Lass and Lad
- Leafy June
- Life Time and Love Time
- Little Roundhead Maid
- Love's Service
- Love that Goes A-Courting
- May Time in Midwinter (text by Algernon Charles Swinburne)
- Milkmaid (text by Henry Austin Dobson)
- Molly Maloney (text by Alfred Perceval Graves)
- Moonspell
- More and More
- Nancy
- No Sir!
- Northern Songs (collection)
- Queen of Sixty Years (for chorus)
- Serenade
- Shaking Grass
- Shearing Day
- Sweet Sally Gray
- When the Boys Come Home
- Yes Sir!
- You May

== Writing and lectures ==
Wakefield knew John Ruskin, whose many interests included music. Towards the end of his life she edited a collection of his observations on the subject, Ruskin on Music (1894). She presented lectures and wrote articles about various musical topics. Several of her articles were published in Murray's Magazine from July to December, 1889, under the title Foundation Stones of English Music . The topics of her lectures and articles included:

- English National Melody in the 13th, 14th, and 15th Centuries: Monks and Minstrels
- English Melody under Elizabeth, Including Contemporary Settings of Some of Shakespeare's Songs
- English Melody in the 17th Century: Cavaliers and Roundheads
- English Melody in the 18th Century
- Irish National Melodies
- Jubilee Lecture on Victorian Song
- Madrigal Time
- Scotch National Melodies
- Shakespeare's Songs and their Musical Settings
- Skene and Straloch Lute Manuscripts
- Songs of Four Nations (England, Scotland, Ireland, and Wales)
- Songs of Handel
- Songs of Schubert
- Songs of Schumann

== Festivals ==
Wakefield started several choirs in villages around Kendal, near her family home. In 1885, with her sister Agnes, she brought the choirs together for an outdoor festival to raise money for her local parish church St Thomas', Crosscrake, which had been built with support from her father. In addition to raising money for the church, Wakefield wanted to encourage local, amateur music and make music more important in English life.

=== Legacy ===
Her festival continues today as the Mary Wakefield Westmorland Festival, and has inspired similar music festivals in other English towns. The festival took place biennially for many years, with the 2025 event taking place in Kendal Town Hall and the local leisure centre. It was announced in 2025 that there would be a festival in 2026 and that venues would include St Thomas' Church, Crosscrake and St Thomas' Church, Kendal.

When Wakefield died in 1910, the Association of Musical Competition Festivals created a Mary Wakefield medal to be awarded at English music festivals. The medal included an image of Wakefield and Martin Luther's quotation "Music is a fair and glorious gift from God." The medal has been awarded between 1999 and 2014 for "best performance by a mixed choir" at the Peterborough Music Festival and in 2004 at the Leith Hill Music Festival.

Musicologist Rosa Newmarch published Mary Wakefield: a Memoir (1912, Kendal: Atkinson & Pollitt).

In 2003, a plaque was erected at Wakefield Bank House, Stricklandgate, Kendal, to celebrate the 150th anniversary of Wakefield's birth and commemorate her pioneering work developing English music festivals.
