= William Wakefield (disambiguation) =

William Wakefield was a soldier.

William Wakefield or Bill Wakefield may also refer to:

- William Wakefield (MP) for Leicester (UK Parliament constituency)
- William Wakefield (baseball)
- William Wakefield (cricketer)
- William Wakefield (banker)
- Bill Wakefield (high jumper) (born 1924), American high jumper, 1946 All-American for the USC Trojans track and field team
