= Docker, Lancashire =

Hamlet in Lancashire, England

Coordinates: 54.164°N 2.652°W

Docker
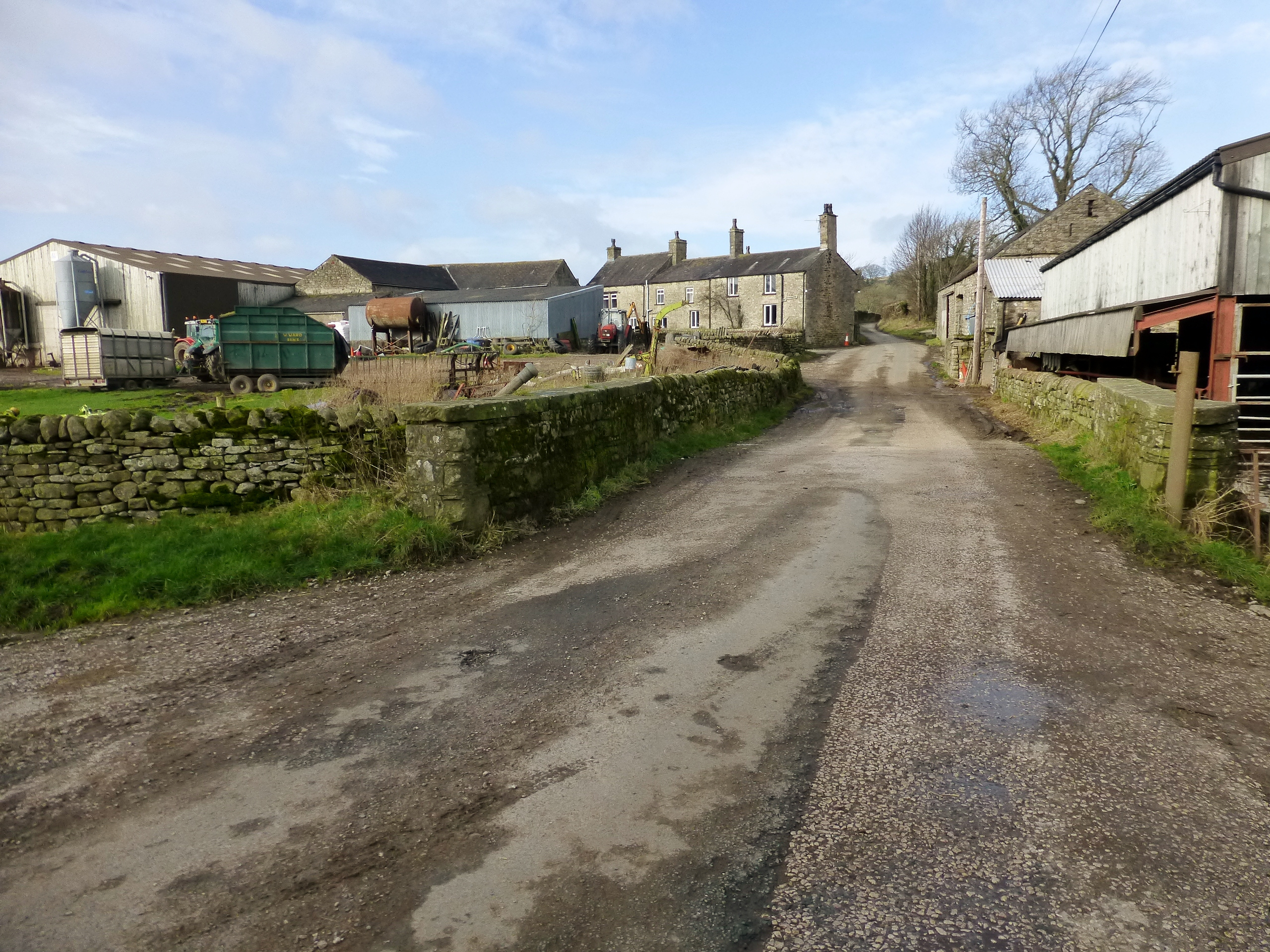
- Docker Farm

- Location in the City of Lancaster district Location within Lancashire
- Civil parish: Whittington
- District: Lancaster
- Shire county: Lancashire
- Region: North West
- Country: England
- Sovereign state: United Kingdom
- Police: Lancashire
- Fire: Lancashire
- Ambulance: North West

Docker is a hamlet in the civil parish of Whittington, Lancashire, England. It is in the City of Lancaster district, north of Arkholme and south west of Whittington.

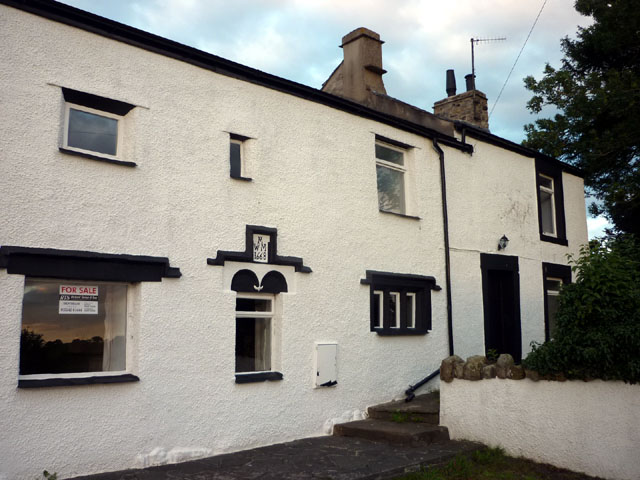
Docker Garth

There are two Grade II listed buildings: Docker Hall farmhouse and Docker Cottage.

The Victoria County History records that the township of Whittington "was formerly divided into two parts, Whittington proper to the north ... and Newton with Docker to the south", and its earliest mention of Docker is a "Henry Brabin of Docker" (fl.1585).
