= Loyn =

Loyn may refer to:

== People ==
- David Loyn (born 1954), British journalist
- H. R. Loyn (1922–2000), British historian

== Places ==
- Loyn Bridge, England

== Other ==
- Loyn & Co
