= Newton, Lancaster =

Hamlet in Lancashire, England

Coordinates: 54.166°N 2.618°W

Newton
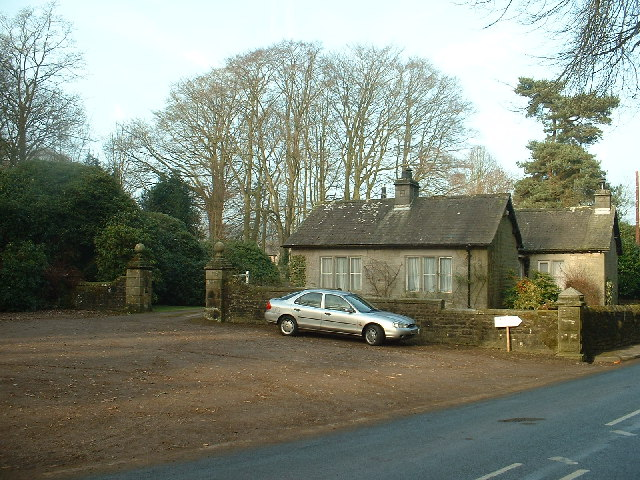
- A lodge in Newton

- Location in the City of Lancaster district Location within Lancashire
- Civil parish: Whittington
- District: Lancaster
- Shire county: Lancashire
- Region: North West
- Country: England
- Sovereign state: United Kingdom
- Police: Lancashire
- Fire: Lancashire
- Ambulance: North West

Newton is a hamlet in the civil parish of Whittington, Lancashire, England. It is in the City of Lancaster district, south of Whittington on the B 6254 road and about half a mile west of the River Lune.

There are four Grade II listed buildings: the 1692 "House in grounds west of Newton Hall", the 1692 Newton Gate, the "late C17th and mid C19th" Newton Hall Farmhouse and the "rebuilt probably in 1880s, probably by Paley and Austin" Newton Hall.

The Victoria County History records that the township of Whittington "was formerly divided into two parts, Whittington proper to the north ... and Newton with Docker to the south", and its earliest mention of Newton is "Henry Brabin died in 1617 holding ... lands ... in Whittington and Newton".
