= St Michael's Church, Whittington =

Church in Lancashire, England

Coordinates: 54.1808°N 2.6149°W

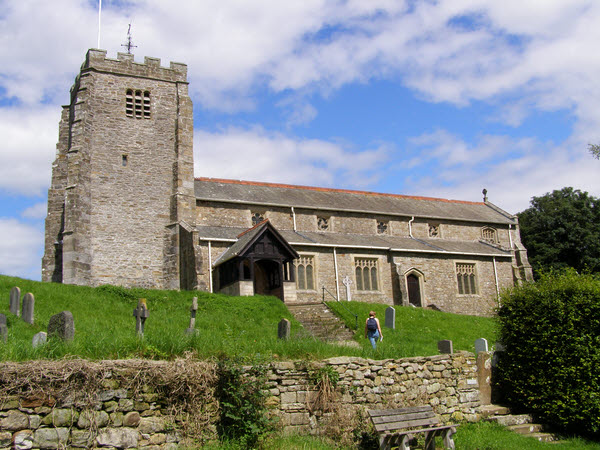
- St Michael's Church, Whittington, from the south

- Location in the City of Lancaster district
- OS grid reference: SD 600,763
- Location: Whittington, Lancashire
- Country: England
- Denomination: Anglican
- Website: St Michael, Whittington

History
- Status: Parish church
- Dedication: Saint Michael the Archangel

Architecture
- Functional status: Active
- Heritage designation: Grade II*
- Designated: 4 October 1967
- Architect(s): Paley and Austin (1875 rebuilding)
- Architectural type: Church
- Style: Gothic, Gothic Revival
- Completed: 1875

Specifications
- Materials: Sandstone, slate roofs

Administration
- Province: York
- Diocese: Blackburn
- Archdeaconry: Lancaster
- Deanery: Tunstall
- Parish: Whittington

Clergy
- Vicar: Revd Iain H. Rennie

St Michael's Church is located in the settlement of Whittington, Lancashire, England. It is an active Anglican parish church in the deanery of Tunstall, the archdeaconry of Lancaster and the diocese of Blackburn. Its benefice is united with those of St John the Evangelist, Gressingham, St Margaret, Hornby, and St John the Baptist, Arkholme. The church is recorded in the National Heritage List for England as a designated Grade II* listed building.

== History ==
The church stands within the bailey of a former castle. It is thought that a church has been on this site since 1200. The oldest part of the present church is the tower, which dates from the early 16th century. The rest of the church was largely rebuilt in 1875 by the Lancaster architects Paley and Austin. Its cost was met mainly by Colonel D. C. Greene of nearby Whittington Hall.

== Architecture ==
=== Exterior ===
St Michael's is constructed in sandstone rubble with slate roofs. Its plan consists of a four-bay nave with a clerestory, north and south aisles, a south porch, a single-bay chancel with an organ chamber and vestry to the north, and a west tower. The tower has diagonal buttresses, and an embattled parapet. It contains a west doorway, above which is a three-light window. In the south wall of the tower are re-set fragments of stone carved with chevrons. The bell openings have three lights. Along the south aisle are a timber porch, three three-light windows containing Perpendicular tracery and, leading into the chancel, a doorway. The clerestory windows consist of four windows with square surrounds, pierced alternatively with quatrefoils and circles. The north aisle has two windows, and the clerestory is similar to the south side. At the east end are buttresses and a three-light window with Perpendicular tracery.

=== Interior ===
The arcades are carried on octagonal piers and have pointed arches. The timber roof is open. In the church is an elaborately carved chancel screen. The reredos is in stone and is also carved. The font is in marble, carved with panels containing tracery, shields and other forms of decoration; it dates from the late 19th century. Also in the church are the Royal arms of George III, overpainting the arms of Charles II. The stained glass includes three windows, including the east window, by Powell, dating from about 1875. There are two windows in the south aisle by Kempe and Tower dated 1922. In addition there is a window dated 1968 depicting Saint Blaise by Lawrence Lee. The two-manual organ was built by Abbott and Smith. There is a ring of six bells. The oldest of these was cast in 1739 by Edward Seller II, the next in 1754 by Abel Rudhall, and the other four in 1875 by John Taylor & Co.

== External features ==
In the churchyard is a sundial with a base dated 1641 in sandstone with a brass plate and gnomon. It has been listed at Grade II. It stands on the summit of the former motte. To commemorate the millennium of 2000, a mosaic by Maggie Howarth was installed at the entrance to the churchyard.

== Assessment ==
The church was listed at Grade II* on 4 October 1967. Grade II* is the middle of the three gradings given by English Heritage, and is granted to buildings that "are particularly important buildings of more than special interest". The site on which the church and sundial stand is a Scheduled Monument.

== See also ==
- Grade II* listed buildings in Lancashire
- Listed buildings in Whittington, Lancashire
- List of ecclesiastical works by Paley and Austin
- Scheduled monuments in Lancashire
