= List of works by Paley and Austin =

Works by architecture firm

Paley and Austin was the title of a firm of architects working in Lancaster, Lancashire, England, between 1868 and 1886, the partners being E. G. Paley and Hubert Austin.

Lists of the works executed by the practice can be found at:

- List of ecclesiastical works by Paley and Austin
- List of non-ecclesiastical works by Paley and Austin
