= List of non-ecclesiastical works by Paley and Austin =

Paley and Austin were the surnames of two architects working from a practice in Lancaster, Lancashire, England, between 1868 and 1886. The practice had been founded in 1836 by Edmund Sharpe. The architects during the period covered by this list are E. G. Paley and Hubert Austin. E. G. Paley had joined Edmund Sharpe in partnership in 1845. This partnership continued until 1851, when Sharpe retired, and Paley ran the business as a single principal until he was joined by Hubert Austin in 1868. The partnership of Paley and Austin continued until they were joined as a partner by Paley's son, Henry Paley, in 1886.

This list covers the non-ecclesiastical works executed by the practice during the partnership of Paley and Austin; the period from 1868 to 1886. These include new houses and alterations to houses (which varied in size from large country mansions to tenement blocks), railway stations, schools and alterations to schools, banks, industrial buildings, hospitals, and a bridge. Because of the location of the practice, most of their non-ecclesiastical work was in the areas that are now Cumbria, Lancashire, and Greater Manchester, but examples can also be found in Cheshire, Yorkshire, Merseyside, County Durham, Buckinghamshire, and Wales.

== Key ==
Grade	Criteria
Grade I	Buildings of exceptional interest, sometimes considered to be internationally important.
Grade II*	Particularly important buildings of more than special interest.
Grade II	Buildings of national importance and special interest.
"—" denotes a work that is not graded.

== Works ==
Name	Location	Photograph	Date	Notes	Grade
Kents Bank railway station	Kents Bank, Cumbria; 54.1729°N 2.9254°W		1865	Built for the Furness Railway.	—
Giggleswick School	Giggleswick, North Yorkshire; 54.0728°N 2.2939°W	—	1867–69	Boarding house.	II
Town Hall	St John's Chapel, County Durham; 54.737°N 2.181°W	—	1868		—
Sedgwick House	Sedgwick, Cumbria; 54.2765°N 2.7538°W		1868–69	New house in Perpendicular style. Later used as a school, and agter that converted into apartments.	II
Bank, 68 Church Street	Lancaster, Lancashire; 54.0500°N 2.8018°W		1870	New bank for the Lancaster Banking Company; now National Westminster Bank.	II*
Walton Hall	Walton, Warrington, Cheshire; 53.3599°N 2.6023°W		1870	Additions and alterations.	II
School and school house	Winmarleigh, Lancashire	—	1870		—
Leighton Hall	Yealand Conyers, Lancashire; 54.1630°N 2.7758°W		1870	Added west wing and built a higher tower.	II*
Flax and jute mill	Barrow-in-Furness, Cumbria		1870–72	A large mill and warehouses to provide work for women, it was constructed in red brick, with bands of terracotta and Yorkshire stone. It closed in the early 20th century, the tower was demolished in 1930, followed by the offices in 1948.	—
Whittington Hall	Whittington, Lancashire; 54.1807°N 2.6201°W		1870–90	Addition and alterations, including a billiards room and a clock tower.	II*
Winmarleigh Hall	Winmarleigh, Lancashire; 53.9208°N 2.8086°W		1871	For the 1st Baron Winmarleigh in Jacobean style.	—
Shipworks	Barrow-in-Furness, Cumbria	—	1871–72	For Ashburner.	—
Militia Barracks	South Road, Lancaster, Lancashire; 54.0444°N 2.7981°W		1871–72	Extension. Now used as offices.	II
Villas	Cavendish Park, Barrow Island, Cumbria; 54.1053°N 3.2276°W	—	1872		—
Grange-over-Sands railway station	Grange-over-Sands, Cumbria; 54.1957°N 2.9028°W		1872	Station rebuilt.	II
Tenement block including mission and public house	Michaelson Street, Barrow Island, Cumbria; 54.1046°N 3.2309°W		1872–74		II*
Ermysted's Grammar School	Skipton, North Yorkshire; 53.9634°N 2.0227°W		1872–74	Grammar school built on new site.	II
Ulverston railway station	Ulverston, Cumbria; 54.1917°N 3.0976°W	—	1872–74	For the Furness Railway.	—
Bank	Ramsden Square, Barrow-in-Furness, Cumbria; 54.1137°N 3.2313°W		1873	For the Cumberland Banking Company. Now offices.	II
Bootle railway station	Bootle, Cumbria; 54.2913°N 3.3938°W		1873	The "simple but attractive weatherboarded, timber-framed waiting room" dates from 1873 and was listed in 2022.	II
Holker Hall	Holker, Cumbria; 54.1884°N 2.9837°W		1873	New west wing in Elizabethan style.	II*
Vicarage	Rose Lane, Mossley Hill, Liverpool, Merseyside; 53.3767°N 2.9200°W	—	1873	Vicarage for the Church of St Matthew and St James.	II
Morecambe railway station	Morecambe, Lancashire	—	1873	Built in Northumberland Street; some of its features removed and incorporated in Morecambe Promenade railway station when it was built in 1909 in Marine Road Central.	—
Bank	Ramsden Square, Barrow-in-Furness, Cumbria; 54.1144°N 3.2311°W		1873–74	For the Lancaster Banking Company. Now the National Westminster Bank.	II
Underley Hall	Kirkby Lonsdale, Cumbria; 54.2157°N 2.5919°W		1874	Additions, including a new wing and tower; now a school.	II*
Gateway	Borough Cemetery, Barrow-in-Furness, Cumbria; 54.1262°N 3.2257°W	—	1874	Built in limestone with red sandstone dressings, it consists of a central three-bay section in two storeys, containing three archways, and two lateral wings.	II
School and school house	Bolton-by-Bowland, Lancashire	—	1874		II
Millom railway station	Millom, Cumbria; 54.2110°N 3.2706°W		1874		—
Oak Lea	Barrow-in-Furness, Cumbria	—	1874	New house for Mr Schneider; demolished 1913 (other than the Gate Lodge and the Coach House).	—
Witherslack Hall	Witherslack, Cumbria; 54.2679°N 2.8671°W	—	1874	New house.	II
North lodge	Borough Cemetery, Barrow-in-Furness, Cumbria; 54.1288°N 3.2245°W		c. 1874	Now a private house, it is built in limestone with red sandstone dressings. It has two storeys and an L-shaped plan.	II
Pilot cottages	Piel Island, Cumbria; 54.0652°N 3.1747°W	—	1875		—
Cark railway station	Cark, Cumbria	—	1875		—
Schools	Cambridge Street, Barrow-in-Furness, Cumbria	—	1875	With additions in about 1880.	—
Kirkby-in-Furness railway station	Kirkby-in-Furness, Cumbria; 54.2325°N 3.1875°W	—	1875	Station for the Furness Railway, now demolished.	—
Tenement block	Michaelson Street, Barrow Island, Cumbria; 54.1034°N 3.2318°W		c. 1875		II*
Capernwray Hall	Over Kellet, Lancaster, Lancashire; 54.1436°N 2.6959°W		1875–76	Southeast block, including a billiard room, added to the hall.	II*
Sandside railway station	Sandside, Lancashire; 54.2219°N 2.7968°W	—	1876	Station on the Furness Railway, now demolished.	—
Colliery schools	Whitehaven, Cumbria	—	1876		—
Piel Castle	Piel Island, Cumbria; 54.0622°N 3.1734°W		1876–78	Restoration of the turret and a staircase for the Duke of Buccleuch.	I
Hoghton Tower	Hoghton, Lancashire; 53.7329°N 2.5737°W		1876–80	Restoration.	I
Askham railway station	Askham, Cumbria	—	1877		—
Hydraulic Engine House	Ramsden Dock, Barrow-in-Furness, Cumbria	—	1877		—
Seascale railway station	Seascale, Cumbria; 54.3961°N 3.4849°W	—	1874		—
Lancaster Royal Grammar School	East Road, Lancaster, Lancashire; 54.0471°N 2.7901°W		1877	Extensions in 1877 and 1881.	II
Baths	Abbey Road, Barrow-in-Furness, Cumbria		1878	Alterations.	II
Water tower	Seascale railway station, Cumbria; 54.39594°N 3.48381°W		1878	Built for the Furness Railway; it has three stages and a conical slate roof with a finial.	II
Sedbergh School	Sedbergh, Cumbria; 54.3207°N 2.5286°W	—	1878	Built School House in 1878 and Sedgwick House the following year.	II
St Peter's vicarage and school	Scorton, Lancashire; 53.9318°N 2.7593°W	—	1878–79	In association with St Peter's Church.	—
Foxfield railway station	Foxfield, Cumbria; 54.2587°N 3.2160°W	—	1879	Enlarged station for the Furness Railway.	—
The Knoll	Westbourne Road, Lancaster, Lancashire	—	1879	A house designed by Austin for himself. Now a resource centre.	II
St Mary's School	Lancaster, Lancashire	—	1879–80		—
Hornby Castle	Hornby, Lancashire; 54.1114°N 2.6323°W		1879–82	Additions to the west side.	I
Thurland Castle	Tunstall, Lancashire; 54.1520°N 2.5978°W		1879–88	A castellated house which had been almost completely destroyed by a fire; virtually a new building, partly in Elizabethan style, partly Gothic. Now divided into apartments.	II*
Newton Hall	Newton, Whittington, Lancashire; 54.1671°N 2.6192°W	—	1880	New house, rebuilt on the site of a previous house.	II
All Souls School	Astley Bridge, Bolton, Greater Manchester; 53.5938°N 2.4333°W	—	1880–81	New school, now a community centre.	II
Hampsfield House	Lindale, Cumbria; 54.2167°N 2.9100°W	—	1880–82	A new country house for Sir John Tomlinson Hibbert, M.P.	—
Royal Albert Hospital	Lancaster, Lancashire; 54.0534°N 2.7752°W		1880–83	Additions to mental hospital.	II*
Vicarage	Arnside, Cumbria	—	1881		—
Bridge	Caton, Lancashire; 54.0759°N 2.7316°W		1881–83	Road bridge over the River Lune.	II
Tenements	Steamer Street, Barrow Island, Cumbria54.1036°N 3.2299°W		1881–84		II*
Tenements	Sloop Street, Barrow Island, Cumbria; 54.1025°N 3.2308°W	—	1881–84		II*
Tenements	Brig Street, Barrow Island, Cumbria; 54.1030°N 3.2300°W	—	1881–84		II
Tenements	Schooner Street, Barrow Island, Cumbria; 54.1028°N 3.2295°W	—	1881–84		II
Tenements	Ship Street, Barrow Island, Cumbria; 54.1033°N 3.2313°W	—	1881–84		II
Station and warehouse	Ramsden Dock, Barrow-in-Furness, Cumbria	—	1882		—
Coffee Hotel	Barrow Island, Cumbria	—	1882		—
Central railway station	Barrow-in-Furness, Cumbria; 54.1190°N 3.2260°W	—	1882	For the Furness Railway. Destroyed in the Second World War.	—
Rylands House	Owen Road, Lancaster, Lancashire	—	1883	Extensions.	II
North Lonsdale Hospital	Barrow-in-Furness, Cumbria	—	1883–87		—
Masonic Hall	Abbey Road, Barrow-in-Furness, Cumbria	—	1884		—
Fawley Court	Fawley, Buckinghamshire; 51.5516°N 0.8979°W	—	1884	Addition of a new wing and terraces. Now a school.	I
All Saints School	Higher Walton, Lancashire	—	1884	New school.	—
School House, St. Bees School	St Bees, Cumbria; 54.4944°N 3.5925°W		1885		—
Home Farm and dairy	Whittington, Lancashire	—	1885	Dairy and tea room added to farmhouse.	II
St Barnabas' Vicarage	West Street, Crewe, Cheshire; 53.1021°N 2.4622°W	—	c. 1885	Vicarage for St Barbabas' Church.	II
Additional buildings, Ripley School	Lancaster, Lancashire; 54.0393°N 2.8018°W	—	1885–86		II
St Barnabas' School	West Street, Crewe, Cheshire; 53.1020°N 2.4633°W	—	1887		—
Stables, Whittington Hall	Whittington, Lancashire; 54.1808°N 2.6200°W	—	1887	Alterations to stables designed in the 1830s by George Webster, and later used for domestic accommodation.	II
Lodge, Whittington Hall	Whittington, Lancashire; 54.1814°N 2.6203°W	—	1890	Built as the north lodge to Whittington Hall.	II
St Bees signal box	St Bees, Cumbria; 54.4928°N 3.5913°W		1891	Signal box built for the Furness Railway.	II
Dale Garth	Hawcoat, Barrow-in-Furness, Cumbria	—	Undated	New house, now demolished.	—
Drigg railway station	Drigg, Cumbria	—	Undated		—
Llandovery College	Llandovery, Carmarthenshire, Wales; 51.9954°N 3.8005°W	—	Undated	Additional buildings.	—
Ravenglass railway station	Ravenglass, Cumbria; 54.3557°N 3.4089°W	—	Undated		—
Chapel Ridding House	Windermere, Cumbria	—	Undated		—
