= Hampsfield House =

Coordinates: 54.2167°N 2.9100°W

Hampsfield House is a country house located to the west of the village of Lindale, Cumbria, England. It was built between 1880 and 1882, and designed by the Lancaster architects Paley and Austin. The house cost about £7,000 (equivalent to £890,000 in 2023). It was built for Sir John Tomlinson Hibbert, Member of Parliament for Oldham, who was Parliamentary Secretary to the Local Government Board under Gladstone in 1871–74, and again in 1880–83. The house was featured and illustrated in the British Architect in 1881.

== See also ==
- List of non-ecclesiastical works by Paley and Austin
