= Gressingham =

Village in Lancashire, England

Coordinates: 54.123°N 2.656°W

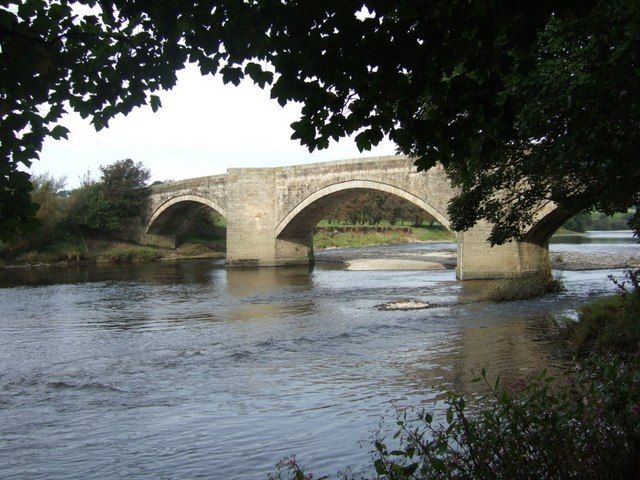
- Loyn Bridge

- Location in the City of Lancaster district Location in the Forest of Bowland AONB Location within Lancashire
- Population: 151 (2011)
- OS grid reference: SD571699
- Civil parish: Gressingham
- District: Lancaster
- Shire county: Lancashire
- Region: North West
- Country: England
- Sovereign state: United Kingdom
- Post town: LANCASTER
- Postcode district: LA2
- Dialling code: 01524
- Police: Lancashire
- Fire: Lancashire
- Ambulance: North West
- UK Parliament: Morecambe and Lunesdale

Gressingham is a small village and civil parish in the City of Lancaster In the 2001 census, it had a population of 153, decreasing slightly to 151 at the 2011 census.

St John the Evangelist's Church was originally built in the 12th century. It was partly rebuilt in 1734, and restored by Edward Paley in 1862.

== Notable people ==
John Young Stratton (1829/30 – 1905): author, essayist, social reformer and campaigner against rural poverty.

In 1903, the cost of the new 35-foot Liverpool-class lifeboat at Skerries Lifeboat Station in County Dublin, was met by a legacy gift from the Rev. W. S. Maynard of Gressingham, and named William Maynard (ON 493).

== See also ==
- Listed buildings in Gressingham
