= Listed buildings in Whittington, Lancashire =

Whittington is a civil parish in Lancaster, Lancashire, England. It contains 39 buildings that are recorded in the National Heritage List for England as designated listed buildings. Of these, three are at Grade II*, the middle grade, and the others are at Grade II, the lowest grade. The parish contains the villages of Whittington, Docker and Newton, and is otherwise rural. Most of the listed buildings are country houses with associated structures, smaller houses, and farm buildings. The other listed buildings include a church with a sundial in the churchyard, buildings on a model farm, three milestones, a boundary stone, and a former school.

== Key ==
| Grade | Criteria |
|---|---|
| II* | Particularly important buildings of more than special interest |
| II | Buildings of national importance and special interest |

== Buildings ==
| Name and location | Photograph | Date | Notes | Grade |
|---|---|---|---|---|
| St Michael's Church; 54.18075°N 2.61479°W | | Early 16th century | The oldest part of the church is the tower, the rest of it having been largely rebuilt in 1875 by Paley and Austin. The church is in sandstone with slate roofs, and consists of a nave and a chancel with a clerestory, aisles, a south porch, and a west tower. The tower has diagonal buttresses with offsets, and an embattled parapet. The windows along the aisles are Perpendicular in style. | II* |
| Sellet Hall; 54.19087°N 2.61400°W | — | c. 1600 | A country house in sandstone with a slate roof in two storeys. It is in the form of a hall and cross-wing, the latter altered. Some of the windows are mullioned and transomed, and others are cross windows. The hall has a two-storey bay window, and a re-set doorway with a moulded surround and a lintel with a triangular head. There are also two large projecting chimney stacks. | II* |
| Docker Hall Farmhouse and barns 54.16911°N 2.65979°W | — | Early 17th century | The house and barns are in sandstone with slate roofs. The house has two storeys, and most of the windows are sashes, with remains of some mullioned windows, To the right and at right angles is a range of farm buildings, dating probably from the 18th century. These contain an oval inscribed plaque, a mullioned window, ventilation slits, a re-set moulded Tudor arched lintel, and a re-set inscribed datestone. | II |
| Low Hall; 54.17722°N 2.60999°W | — | Early 17th century | A pebbledashed stone house with a slate roof, in two storeys and two bays. Two bays were added later to the right. The openings have plain surrounds. | II |
| Sundial; 54.18063°N 2.61536°W | — | 1641 | The sundial is in the churchyard of St Michael's Church. It is in sandstone, and consists of a square chamfered shaft on three steps. On the top is a brass plate with a gnomon and a weathered inscription. | II |
| Manor House; 54.18113°N 2.61371°W | | 1658 | A sandstone house with a slate roof in two storeys and three bays. The windows are mullioned, and the central doorway has a chamfered surround, a triangular head, and an inscribed lintel. | II |
| High House; 54.18189°N 2.61999°W | — | Late 17th century | The house is in pebbledashed stone with a tile roof. It has a T-shaped plan with a rear wing, it is in two storeys, and has a three-bay front. The windows are mullioned, and on the front is a single-storey porch with a parapet. Both inner and outer doors have Tudor arched heads, and above the outer door is a re-set carved shield. | II |
| Newton Hall Farmhouse; 54.16833°N 2.61837°W | — | Late 17th century | A pebbledashed stone house with a slate roof in two storeys that was extended in the 19th century. The original part has mullioned windows, and a doorway with a chamfered surround and an embattled lintel. The extension to the left projects forward, has two bays and modern windows. Above the central doorway is a pediment. | II |
| West Hall Farmhouse; 54.17663°N 2.62730°W | — | Late 17th century | The farmhouse is in pebbledashed stone with a slate roof in two storeys. The original part has three bays with mullioned windows. To the right is a later bay with a sash window. The doorway is chamfered and has an ogee shape on the lintel. There is a later rear wing containing three re-set carved corbels and a re-set datestone. | II |
| Docker Cottage; 54.16636°N 2.65713°W | — | 1685 | A rendered stone house with a slate roof in two storeys with a rear wing. The windows are mullioned, and the doorway has a moulded surround and an inscribed shaped lintel. | II |
| Malt Kiln and barn 54.17849°N 2.61196°W | — | 1687 | A house and barn in stone with a slate roof. The house is pebbledashed and has two storeys and two bays. The ground floor windows are sashes, and the upper floor windows are mullioned. The doorway has a moulded surround and an inscribed shaped lintel. To the left is a barn dating probably from the late 18th century that has a cart entrance with a segmental arch. | II |
| Chapel House Farmhouse; 54.16737°N 2.62060°W | — | 1688 | The farmhouse is rendered with a slate roof, and has two storeys. There is a single-storey gabled porch, and the windows are mullioned. The inner doorway has a moulded surround and an inscribed battlemented lintel. | II |
| Newton Gate; 54.16450°N 2.61887°W | — | 1692 | A sandstone house with a slate roof, in two storeys and with a symmetrical two-bay front. In the centre is a two-storey gabled porch that has a window with three round-headed lights in the upper floor. The other windows are stepped and have mullions and transoms. The doorway has a moulded surround with an inscribed shaped lintel. | II |
| House in grounds of Newton Hall; 54.16694°N 2.61985°W | — | 1692 | The house is in sandstone with a tile roof, and has two storeys and a symmetrical four-bay front. In the centre is a two-storey gabled porch. The doorway has a moulded surround and an inscribed embattled lintel. | II |
| Home Farmhouse, with dairy and tea room 54.18038°N 2.61611°W | — | c. 1700 | A dairy and tea room were added to the house in 1885 by Paley and Austin. The house has two storeys, and a doorcase with pilasters and a hood on brackets. To the left is a single-storey tea room with applied timber-framing. To the left of this is the octagonal dairy, with a timber roof surmounted by a lantern. Inside the dairy are marble shelves carried on baluster columns. | II |
| Old Rectory; 54.18079°N 2.61384°W | — | 1728 | A rendered sandstone house with a stone-slate roof in Georgian style. It has two storeys and a symmetrical front of five bays with sash windows. The doorway has a chamfered rusticated surround, a round head, and moulded imposts, and above it is a carved and inscribed plaque. At the rear are mullioned windows. | II |
| Cross House and barn 54.18126°N 2.61245°W | — | 1738 | The house and barn are in sandstone. The house has a slate roof, and is in two storeys and three bays. The mullions have been removed from the windows, and the doorway has a moulded surround that rises to form an ogee shape on the inscribed lintel. The barn to the right dates probably from the early 19th century, it has a stone-slate roof, and contains a wide opening. (Note: Street View dated August 2010 shows that the barn has been converted for domestic use.) | II |
| Croft View; 54.18064°N 2.61187°W | — | Mid 18th century | A stone house with a slate roof, in two storeys and two bays. The ground floor windows are sashes, and the doorway has a moulded surround. | II |
| Wayside; 54.18054°N 2.61126°W | — | Mid 18th century (probable) | A sandstone house with a slate roof in two storeys. The original windows are mullioned, and the doorway has a plain surround. | II |
| Whittington Farmhouse and barn 54.18013°N 2.61143°W | — | Mid 18th century (probable) | The house and barn are in stone with a slate roof. The house is pebbledashed, and is in two storeys and three bays. The windows are mullioned, and the doorway has a chamfered surround and an inscribed battlemented lintel, which has probably been re-set. The barn to the right has a blank front. | II |
| Barn, Low Hall; 54.17728°N 2.61091°W | — | Late 18th century (probable) | The barn is in sandstone with a slate roof. On the west front is a wide entrance with chamfered jambs and a canopy, and a pitching door. The right gable end contains three shippon doors, pigeon holes and an owl hole. There is a rear wing with various openings. | II |
| Park House; 54.18037°N 2.61172°W | — | Late 18th century (possible) | A pebbledashed stone house with a slate roof incorporating earlier material. It has two storeys and a rear wing. The windows are mullioned, and above the doorway is a re-set inscribed lintel. | II |
| Barn, High House; 54.18204°N 2.62006°W | — | c. 1800 (probable) | The sandstone barn has a slate roof and incorporates some 17th-century dressings. It contains a wide entrance with a steel lintel, a mullioned window, and a door with arched moulding on the lintel. | II |
| Barn, Low Hall; 54.17711°N 2.61023°W | — | c. 1800 | The barn is in sandstone with a slate roof. It has two wide entrances with segmental arches, one of which is blocked, doors, windows, ventilation slits, and pitching holes. In the gable ends the windows are mullioned. | II |
| Sellet Mill; 54.19231°N 2.60375°W | | Early 19th century | A former water-powered corn mill dating originally from the medieval period, rebuilt on several occasions, and then converted into a house with the addition of a bay. It is mainly in limestone with a slate roof, and has three storeys and three bays. The windows are modern sashes and in the front is a gabled porch. To the right is an iron breast wheel. | II |
| Former stables, Whittington Hall; 54.18074°N 2.61997°W | — | c. 1830 | The stables, designed by George Webster, were altered and extended in 1887 by Paley and Austin, and later converted for domestic use. They are in sandstone with a slate roof, and are in two storeys and four bays, the outer bays being gabled. Some windows are mullioned, some also have transoms, and others are cross windows. On the roof is a cupola with a bell, a clock face, and a domed canopy. The stables are joined to the hall by a Tudor arch. | II |
| Whittington Hall; 54.18038°N 2.61997°W | | 1831–36 | A country house by George Webster in Tudor style, it is in sandstone with slate roofs. There are two storeys with attics, and the main front is symmetrical. Its centre protrudes and is flanked by octagonal turrets, outside which are gabled bays containing mullioned and transomed windows. Behind the main range is an offset battlemented three-storey tower with an octagonal corner turret. Alterations and additions were carried out in 1887 by Paley and Austin. | II* |
| Courtyard wall, Whittington Hall; 54.18007°N 2.61982°W | — | 1830s | The wall encloses the courtyard to the south of the hall. It is in sandstone with saddleback coping, and contains piers with ball finials. On the west side is a chamfered gateway with a Tudor arch. | II |
| South Lodge, gate piers and walls 54.17677°N 2.61295°W | — | 1830s | Formerly the lodge to Whittington Hall and designed by George Webster, it is in stone with a slate roof and has one storey. Facing the drive is a central gabled projection containing a doorway with a chamfered surround and a triangular head. This is flanked by one bay on each side. On the side facing the road is a gabled projection and a canted bay window. The windows have transoms, and some also have mullions. Associated with the lodge is a pair of octagonal gate piers with moulded caps and ball finials, and concave flanking walls. | II |
| Boundary stone 54.19582°N 2.59422°W | — | Mid 19th century | The stone marks the boundary with the parish of Kirkby Lonsdale and the country of Cumbria. It is in sandstone and has a triangular plan with a sloping top. The faces are inscribed with the names of the parishes. | II |
| Milestone; 54.17380°N 2.61470°W | — | Mid 19th century | The milestone is in sandstone and has a triangular plan and a sloping top. The top is inscribed with the name of the parish, and on the sides are the distances in miles to Kirkby Lonsdale, Carnforth, and Lancaster. | II |
| Milestone; 54.18469°N 2.60403°W | — | Mid 19th century | The milestone is in sandstone and has a triangular plan and a sloping top. The top is inscribed with the name of the parish, and on the sides are the distances in miles to Kirkby Lonsdale, Carnforth, and Lancaster. | II |
| Milestone; 54.19582°N 2.59436°W | — | Mid 19th century | The milestone is in sandstone and has a triangular plan and a sloping top. The top is inscribed with the name of the parish, and on the sides are the distances in miles to Kirkby Lonsdale, Carnforth, and Lancaster. | II |
| Hillside; 54.18113°N 2.61452°W | — | Late 19th century (probable) | A sandstone house with a slate roof, probably a conversion, and containing 18th and 19th-century features. It has two storeys and three bays. The windows are mullioned. | II |
| Lune View Cottage; 54.16519°N 2.61889°W | — | Late 19th century | A sandstone house with a stone-slate roof in two storeys and two bays. The ground floor windows are mullioned, and those in the upper floor are circular. In the centre is a gabled porch that has a doorway with a moulded surround and a triangular head. | II |
| Old school and School House; 54.17927°N 2.61265°W | — | 1875 | The former school is in limestone with sandstone dressings and a slate roof. It has mullioned and transomed windows. To the left is a projecting gabled wing with some applied timber-framing and a cupola with a ball finial. To the left is the former master's house. This has two storeys with applied timber-framing to the upper floor, an oriel window rising to form a dormer, a verandah, and a canted bay window. | II |
| Pearson House; 54.18089°N 2.61609°W | — | 1881 | The house incorporates some 17th-century material. It is in sandstone with a slate roof, it has two storeys with an attic, and the windows are mullioned. The south front has a projecting gabled wing, a single-storey canted bay window, and a blocked doorway with a moulded surround and a decorated lintel. On the east front is a two-storey gabled porch that has a doorway with a moulded surround and an inscription. | II |
| Newton Hall; 54.16707°N 2.61916°W | — | 1885 | A country house rebuilt by Paley and Austin incorporating earlier material. It is in sandstone with roofs mainly of slate, and has two storeys. The house has an irregular E-shaped plan, with a wing at the left, a projection at the right, and a two-storey porch between. The windows are mullioned, above the chamfered doorway is a coat of arms, and there are finials on the gables. Re-set in the walls are an inscribed lintel and an inscribed datestone. | II |
| West Hall Lodge; 54.18143°N 2.62039°W | | 1890 | Formerly the north lodge to Whittington Hall, it is in stone with a slate roof and has one storey. Facing the drive is a central gabled projection containing a doorway with a chamfered surround and a triangular head. This is flanked by one bay on each side. On the side facing the road is a gabled projection and a canted bay window. The windows have transoms, and some also have mullions. | II |

== Notes and references ==
Notes

Citations

Sources

- Brandwood, Geoff; Austin, Tim; Hughes, John; Price, James (2012), The Architecture of Sharpe, Paley and Austin, Swindon: English Heritage, ISBN 978-1-84802-049-8
- Hartwell, Clare; Pevsner, Nikolaus (2009) [1969], Lancashire: North, The Buildings of England, New Haven and London: Yale University Press, ISBN 978-0-300-12667-9
- Historic England, "Church of St.Michael, Whittington (1071615)", National Heritage List for England
- Historic England, "Sellet Hall, Whittington (1071649)", National Heritage List for England
- Historic England, "Docker Hall Farmhouse and barns attached on west side, Whittington (1165304)", National Heritage List for England
- Historic England, "Low Hall, Whittington (1165435)", National Heritage List for England
- Historic England, "Sundial and base, west of Church of St.Michael, Whittington (1317331)", National Heritage List for England
- Historic England, "Manor House, Whittington (1165406)", National Heritage List for England
- Historic England, "High House, Whittington (1362567)", National Heritage List for England
- Historic England, "Newton Hall Farmhouse, Whittington (1165377)", National Heritage List for England
- Historic England, "West Hall Farmhouse, Whittington (1165449)", National Heritage List for England
- Historic England, "Docker Cottage, Whittington (1071647)", National Heritage List for England
- Historic England, "Malt Kiln and barn adjoining to south, Whittington (1165443)", National Heritage List for England
- Historic England, "Chapel House Farmhouse, Whittington (1317391)", National Heritage List for England
- Historic England, "Newton Gate, Whittington (1317374)", National Heritage List for England
- Historic England, "House in grounds west of Newton Hall, Whittington (1071651)", National Heritage List for England
- Historic England, "Home Farmhouse, with dairy and tea room attached, Whittington (1071648)", National Heritage List for England
- Historic England, "Old Rectory, Whittington (1362590)", National Heritage List for England
- Historic England, "Cross House and barn adjoining to east, Whittington (1071614)", National Heritage List for England
- Historic England, "Croft View, Whittington (1071618)", National Heritage List for England
- Historic England, "Wayside, Whittington (1165431)", National Heritage List for England
- Historic England, "Whittington Farmhouse and barn adjoining to east, Whittington (1071616)", National Heritage List for England
- Historic England, "Barn on roadside, approximately 150 metres west of Low Hall, Whittington (1362591)", National Heritage List for England
- Historic England, "Park House, Whittington (1165448)", National Heritage List for England
- Historic England, "Barn approximately 8 metres north of High House, Whittington (1165311)", National Heritage List for England
- Historic England, "Barn approximately 40 metres south-west of Low Hall, Whittington (1071617)", National Heritage List for England
- Historic England, "Sellet Mill, Whittington (1165401)", National Heritage List for England
- Historic England, "Former stables north of Whittington Hall (1071650)", National Heritage List for England
- Historic England, "Whittington Hall (1362568)", National Heritage List for England
- Historic England, "Wall enclosing courtyard south of Whittington Hall (1165337)", National Heritage List for England
- Historic England, "South Lodge with adjoining gate piers and their flanking walls, Whittington (1317354)", National Heritage List for England
- Historic England, "Boundary Stone, Whittington (1071613)", National Heritage List for England
- Historic England, "Milestone, Whittington (1071652)", National Heritage List for England
- Historic England, "Milestone, Whittington (1362570)", National Heritage List for England
- Historic England, "Milestone, Whittington (1165402)", National Heritage List for England
- Historic England, "Hillside, Whittington (1362589)", National Heritage List for England
- Historic England, "Lune View Cottage, Whittington (1362569)", National Heritage List for England
- Historic England, "Old school and School House, Whittington (1362592)", National Heritage List for England
- Historic England, "Pearson House, Whittington (1165327)", National Heritage List for England
- Historic England, "Newton Hall, Whittington (1165374)", National Heritage List for England
- Historic England, "West Hall Lodge, Whittington (1317326)", National Heritage List for England
- Historic England, Listed Buildings
