= Crosscrake =

Coordinates: 54.277°N 2.731°W

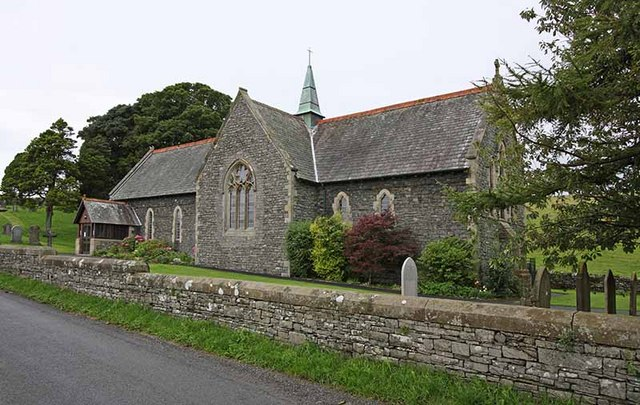
- St. Thomas' Church, Crosscrake

- Location in former South Lakeland district Location within Cumbria
- OS grid reference: SD523870
- Civil parish: Stainton
- Unitary authority: Westmorland and Furness
- Ceremonial county: Cumbria
- Region: North West
- Country: England
- Sovereign state: United Kingdom
- Post town: Kendal
- Postcode district: LA8
- Dialling code: 015395
- Police: Cumbria
- Fire: Cumbria
- Ambulance: North West
- UK Parliament: Westmorland and Lonsdale

Crosscrake is a village in the civil parish of Stainton, in the Westmorland and Furness district, in the ceremonial county of Cumbria, England. It is just off the M6 Junction 36, just South of Kendal on the A6, between the villages/hamlets Stainton, Sedgwick and Barrows Green.

== About ==
Crosscrake is a parish in the Kendal ward. Formerly, it was part of Heversham Parish. It is a small, rural village with a school (Crosscrake C of E School) and a church, St. Thomas', Crosscrake.

== Church ==
St. Thomas' Church was built by Paley and Austin in 1875 of square slate blocks. It was built in the style of the 12th century to 13th century. It has a nave, a chancel and transepts. It also has two stained glass windows, with the eastern facing one being made by Clayton and Bell.
