= St John the Evangelist's Church, Gressingham =

Coordinates: 54.1233°N 2.6556°W

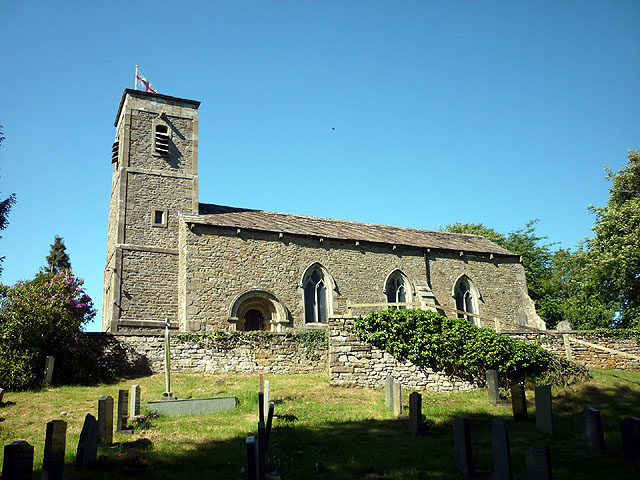
- St John the Evangelist's Church, Gressingham, from the south

- Location in the City of Lancaster district
- OS grid reference: SD 572,699
- Location: Gressingham, Lancashire
- Country: England
- Denomination: Anglican
- Website: St John, Gressingham

History
- Dedication: John the Evangelist

Architecture
- Heritage designation: Grade I
- Designated: 4 October 1967
- Architect: E. G. Paley
- Architectural type: Church
- Style: Norman, Gothic Revival
- Completed: 1862

Specifications
- Capacity: 120
- Materials: Sandstone rubble Stone slate roofs

Administration
- Province: York
- Diocese: Blackburn
- Archdeaconry: Lancaster
- Deanery: Tunstall
- Parish: Whittington

Clergy
- Vicar: Revd Lucie Lunn

St John the Evangelist's Church is in the village of Gressingham, Lancashire, England. The church is recorded in the National Heritage List for England as a designated Grade I listed building. It is an active Anglican parish church in the deanery of Tunstall, the archdeaconry of Lancaster and the diocese of Blackburn. Its benefice is combined with those of St Margaret, Hornby, St John the Baptist, Arkholme, and St Michael the Archangel, Whittington-in-Lonsdale.

== History ==
Parts of the church date from the 12th century. It was partly rebuilt in 1734 and restored in 1862 by E. G. Paley. The restoration included the removal of the porch, rebuilding the south wall with the addition of buttresses and windows, adding a new east window and new lights in the north clerestory, restoration of the chancel arch, reseating, removing the ceiling, and tiling the chancel; this amounted to a cost of about £300 (equivalent to £30,000 in 2025).

== Architecture ==
=== Exterior ===
The church is built in sandstone rubble with a stone slate roof. The plan consists of a west tower, a nave with clerestory, a north aisle and a chancel with a small chapel to the north. The tower, which dates from 1734, is of three stages with pilaster strips and a solid parapet. In the lower stage is a west window. The south nave wall is of three bays, with a buttress between the nave and the chancel. The windows date from the restoration of 1862. At the left of the south aspect is a Norman doorway with jambs in three orders, the outer order having a chevron design and the middle one ropework. The north aisle has two bays to the chancel and three to the nave. A stone with Anglo-Saxon carving is built into the west wall of the nave at the south corner.

=== Interior ===
The nave arcade consists of three bays. The chapel to the north of the chancel contains a tomb chest to George Marton of Capernwray Hall who died in 1867. The pulpit has plain panels and is dated 1714; the pews are box pews. Two of the windows contain stained glass by Morris & Co. Inside the church are two more stones with Anglo-Saxon carving.

== External features ==
The churchyard contains the war graves of a British soldier of World War I, and a British Army officer of World War II.

== See also ==
- Grade I listed churches in Lancashire
- Listed buildings in Gressingham
- List of ecclesiastical works by E. G. Paley
