= Listed buildings in Nether Kellet =

Nether Kellet is a civil parish in Lancaster, Lancashire, England. It contains nine listed buildings that are recorded in the National Heritage List for England. All of the listed buildings are designated at Grade II, the lowest of the three grades, which is applied to "buildings of national importance and special interest". The parish contains the village of Nether Kellet, and is otherwise rural, and the listed buildings are all houses, farmhouses, or farm buildings.

== Buildings ==
Name and location	Photograph	Date	Notes
Old Hall Farmhouse; 54.10825°N 2.75670°W	—	17th century	A stone house with a slate roof, in two storeys and three bays. On the front is a modern porch, and the windows are modern casements, some with mullions.
Westfield House; 54.09253°N 2.77740°W	—	1672	The house is in stone, rendered at the front, with a slate roof. There are two storeys and a symmetrical front of two bays. The windows have plain surrounds, and the doorway has moulded jambs rising to an ogee lintel. The house has been extended to the left.
Lane End Farm building 54.10958°N 2.75499°W	—	Late 17th century	Originally a farmhouse with attached barn, later converted into a farm building. It has a roughcast front with a slate roof and is in two storeys. The former house has a central doorway and mullioned windows. The former barn has a wide doorway with a segmental arch and projecting keystone, two modern windows, and a pitching hole. On the gable end is a ball finial.
Lawsons Farmhouse; 54.10378°N 2.75927°W	—	Late 17th century	The farmhouse is in stone with a slate roof, in two storeys with an attic, and three bays. The windows in the ground floor are mullioned, and those above are sashes. In front of the house is a mounting block.
41 Main Road; 54.10726°N 2.75840°W	—	1719	A stone house with a slate roof, in two storeys and three bays. The windows are mullioned. The doorway has chamfered jambs, and a battlemented lintel inscribed with the date and initials.
Channel Head; 54.10364°N 2.75816°W	—	1721	The stone house is pebbledashed with a slate roof in two storeys and two bays with a two-storey outshut. On the front is a modern bay window, and the other windows are mullioned.
Pump House; 54.09811°N 2.77251°W	—	Mid 18th century	A stone pebbledashed house with a slate roof, in two storeys. The original house has three bays, with a former stable to the left incorporated into the house. On the front is a gabled porch, and the windows are mullioned.
Town End Farm Cottage; 54.10592°N 2.76136°W	—	Mid 18th century	The cottage is in pebbledashed stone with a slate roof, in two storeys. In the centre is a doorway with a plain surround, and the windows flanking and above it are mullioned. On each side of the house are attached former farm buildings that have been converted for domestic use.
Dunald Mill Cottage; 54.10191°N 2.74190°W	—	1822	Originally a house and barn, the barn having been incorporated into the house. This is in sandstone on a plinth and has a stone-slate roof. The original house has two storeys and two bays, The openings have plain surrounds, the windows being sashes. On the front of the barn a cart entrance has been closed and a window inserted.
