= St John the Baptist's Church, Arkholme =

Coordinates: 54.1406°N 2.6305°W

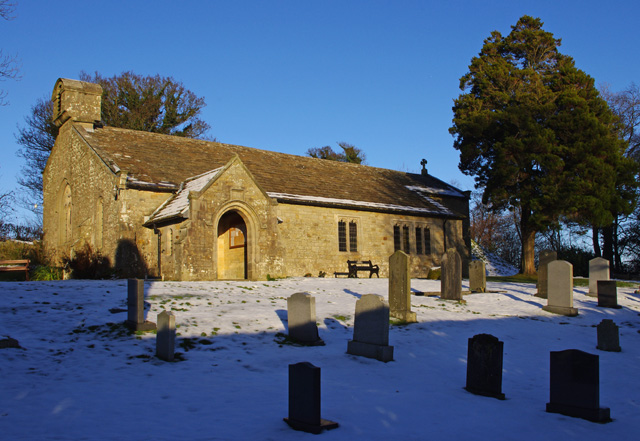
- St John the Baptist's Church, Arkholme, from the southwest

- Location in the City of Lancaster district
- OS grid reference: SD 589,718
- Location: Arkholme, Lancaster, Lancashire
- Country: England
- Denomination: Anglican
- Website: St John the Baptist, Arkholme

History
- Status: Parish church

Architecture
- Functional status: Active
- Heritage designation: Grade II*
- Designated: 4 December 1985
- Architect: Austin and Paley (restoration)
- Architectural type: Church
- Style: Gothic, Gothic Revival
- Groundbreaking: c. 1450
- Completed: 1897

Specifications
- Materials: Sandstone

Administration
- Province: York
- Diocese: Blackburn
- Archdeaconry: Lancaster
- Deanery: Tunstall
- Parish: Arkholme

Clergy
- Vicar: Revd Michael Hampson

St John the Baptist's Church, is in the village of Arkholme, Lancaster, Lancashire, England. It is an active Anglican parish church in the deanery of Tunstall, the archdeaconry of Lancaster, and the diocese of Blackburn. Its benefice is united with those of St Margaret, Hornby, St John the Evangelist, Gressingham, and St Michael the Archangel, Whittington-in-Lonsdale. The church is recorded in the National Heritage List for England as a designated Grade II* listed building. It stands at the end of the village street, overlooking the River Lune, within the bailey of a former castle. The former 11th-century motte stands to the northeast of the church.

== History ==
A church has been present on the site since about 1450, and was originally a chapel of ease in the parish of Melling. It became a parish in its own right in 1866. The church has been restored twice. It was initially a simple rectangular barn-like building. A bellcote was added in 1788, together with a vestry and a west door. It was further restored in 1899 by the Lancaster architects Austin and Paley. They replaced the west door with a window, installed new pews and an east window, replaced the pulpit, enlarged the vestry, and reconstructed the porch. The former Georgian style windows were replaced with windows in Perpendicular style. The work cost over £2,000 (equivalent to £220,000 in 2025).

== Description ==
=== Precincts ===
In the churchyard is a medieval sandstone cross base. It is roughly octagonal in shape with a diameter of about 3 feet (0.9 m), and is about 2 feet (0.6 m) high. The cross base is listed at Grade II.

=== Exterior ===
St John's is constructed in sandstone rubble, and has a stone slate roof. Its plan consists of a nave with a south aisle, a chancel, a vestry, and a south porch. On the west gable is a bellcote. Also at the west end of the nave is a three-light window containing Perpendicular tracery. The west window of the aisle consists of a single trefoiled light. The east window of the chancel has four trefoiled lights, and the window at the east end of the aisle has two round-headed lights.

=== Interior ===
Inside the church is a four-bay arcade of round arches carried on octagonal piers. The capital of the easternmost pier is carved with images, including a dog chasing a hare, and a horn. In the chancel is a twin sedilia and a piscina. There are two fonts, one dating from the 18th century with an octagonal bowl, and the other from the early 20th century. The stained glass includes a window designed by Shrigley and Hunt dated 1965 depicting Saint Hilda and Bede. The two-manual organ was built in 1906 by the local firm of Bibby and Wolfenden, and was rebuilt in 1950 by Wilkinson. The single bell is said to be one of the oldest in England to be inscribed along its lower edge.

== See also ==
- Grade II* listed buildings in Lancashire
- Listed buildings in Arkholme-with-Cawood
- List of ecclesiastical works by Austin and Paley (1895–1914)
