= Nether Kellet =

Coordinates: 54.107°N 2.759°W

- Village and civil parish
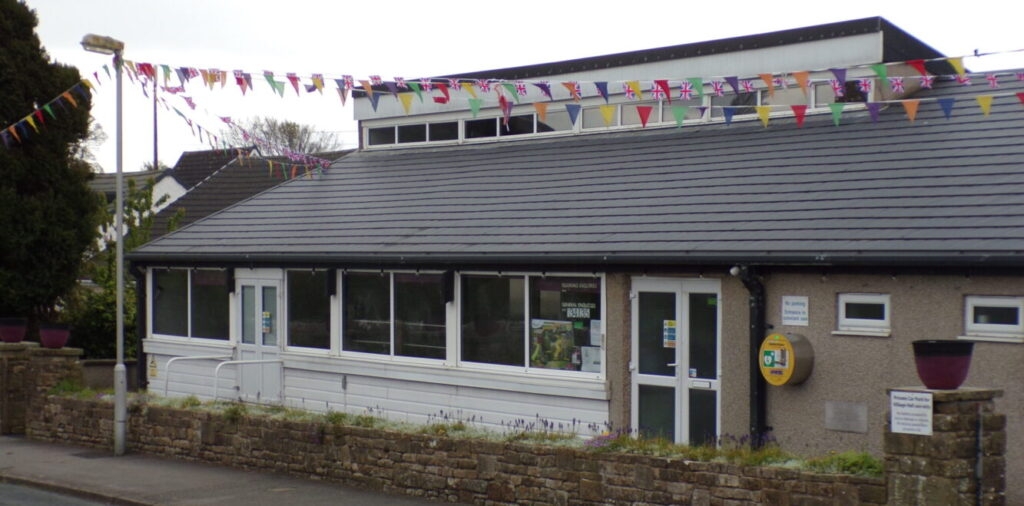
- Nether Kellet Village Hall

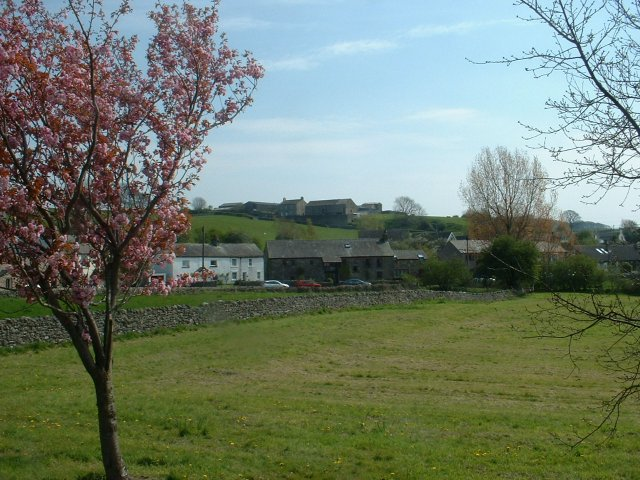
- Village Green

- Location in the City of Lancaster district Location within Lancashire
- Population: 663 (2011)
- OS grid reference: SD504681
- Civil parish: Nether Kellet
- District: Lancaster
- Shire county: Lancashire
- Region: North West
- Country: England
- Sovereign state: United Kingdom
- Post town: CARNFORTH
- Postcode district: LA6
- Dialling code: 01524
- Police: Lancashire
- Fire: Lancashire
- Ambulance: North West
- UK Parliament: Morecambe and Lunesdale

Nether Kellet is a village and civil parish in the City of Lancaster in Lancashire, England, a few miles south of Carnforth. It had a population of 646 recorded in the 2001 census, increasing to 663 at the 2011 Census, and again to 738 at the 2021 census. The parish includes the small hamlet of Addington, to the east.

== Community ==
Nether Kellet is one of the Thankful Villages - only 53 of which are known. These villages and parishes sent men to fight in the Great War, 1914–1918, and all of them came back alive. Nether Kellet sent 21. Their near neighbour, Arkholme, 5 miles (8.0 km) to the east, sent by far the most, 59 men, all of whom returned. It is remarkable to think that two small villages, geographically so close to one another, escaped unscathed from such a conflagration. Furthermore, Nether Kellet was doubly thankful, as 16 villagers served in World War II, 1939–1945, without loss of life. The village is featured on Darren Hayman's album, Thankful Villages Volume 2.

Nether Kellet's Anglican Church of St Mark is part of the ecclesiastical parish of Holy Trinity, Bolton-le-Sands. Nether Kellet Congregational Church is part of the Evangelical Fellowship of Congregational Churches.

== Geography ==
The village is located south of Over Kellet, north of Halton, west of Aughton and east of Bolton-le-Sands.

== In popular culture ==
Not far away, off Dunald Mill Lane and little known today beyond caving circles, lies Dunold Mill-Hole. (now Dunald Mill Hole), subject of a poetical illustration by Letitia Elizabeth Landon (Fisher's Drawing Room Scrap Book, 1836). The accompanying plate, from a painting by George Pickering, shows a number of ramblers with a dog climbing on rocks beside a waterfall.

Nether Kellet is featured on the Darren Hayman album, Thankful Villages Volume 2.

== See also ==
- Listed buildings in Nether Kellet
