= Listed buildings in Sedgwick, Cumbria =

Sedgwick is a civil parish in Westmorland and Furness, Cumbria, England. It contains five listed buildings that are recorded in the National Heritage List for England. All the listed buildings are designated at Grade II, the lowest of the three grades, which is applied to "buildings of national importance and special interest". The parish contains the village of Sedgwick and the surrounding countryside. The Lancaster Canal passed through the parish, but it now dry in this area; There are two listed buildings associated with it, an aqueduct and a bridge. The other listed buildings are a farmhouse, and a former country house and its gatehouse.

== Buildings ==
Name and location	Photograph	Date	Notes
Raines Hall Farmhouse; 54.27628°N 2.73892°W	—	17th century	The farmhouse, which was altered later, is pebbledashed, and has a green slate roof with a stone ridge. There are two storeys, three bays, and a single-storey extension to the left. On the front is a gabled porch with engaged columns and a segmental-arched entrance, and the windows are sashes.
Sedgwick Aqueduct; 54.27654°N 2.74877°W		1818	The aqueduct carried the Lancaster Canal over a road, but it is now dry in this area. The aqueduct is in limestone and consists of a single skewed segmental arch flanked by rusticated pilasters. It has rusticated voussoirs, keystones, a string course, and coped parapets. There are massive curved retaining walls and a flight of stone steps. The aqueduct is also a scheduled monument.
Sedgwick Hill Bridge; 54.27322°N 2.75290°W		1818	Formerly an accommodation bridge over the Lancaster Canal, now dry in this area. It is in limestone, and consists of a single elliptical arch. The bridge has rusticated voussoirs, keystones, a string course, and flat coped parapets. The width between the parapets is about 10 feet (3.0 m).
Gatehouse, Sedgwick House; 54.27647°N 2.75055°W	—	1868	Originally the gatehouse to Sedgwick House, later a private house, it was designed by Paley and Austin. The house is in sandstone, and has a green slate roof with a stone ridge. It has a single storey and an attic, and an L-shaped plan. The entrance is in the octagonal north end. In the east face are mullioned windows and gabled dormers with bargeboards, and in the garden front is a triangular bay window and another dormer.
Sedgwick House School; 54.27624°N 2.75355°W		1868–69	A country house designed by Paley and Austin, and later used as a school. It is in sandstone with granite dressings, and has a green slate roof. There are two storeys with attics, the entrance front has five bays, and the garden front, at right angles, also has five bays. In the centre of the entrance front is a four-storey embattled tower with a stair turret, and in front of it is a porte-cochère. To the left is a single-storey service wing, and a clock tower.
