= Maude Valérie White =

French-born English composer

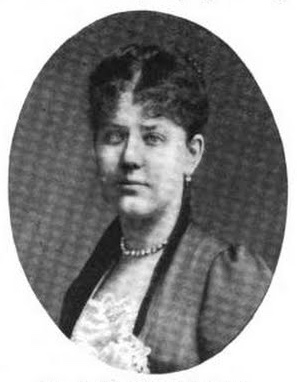
- Maude Valerie White, from a 1901 publication
- Born: 1855; Dieppe, France
- Died: 1937 (aged 82); London, England
- Education: Royal Academy of Music
- Occupation: Composer

Signature
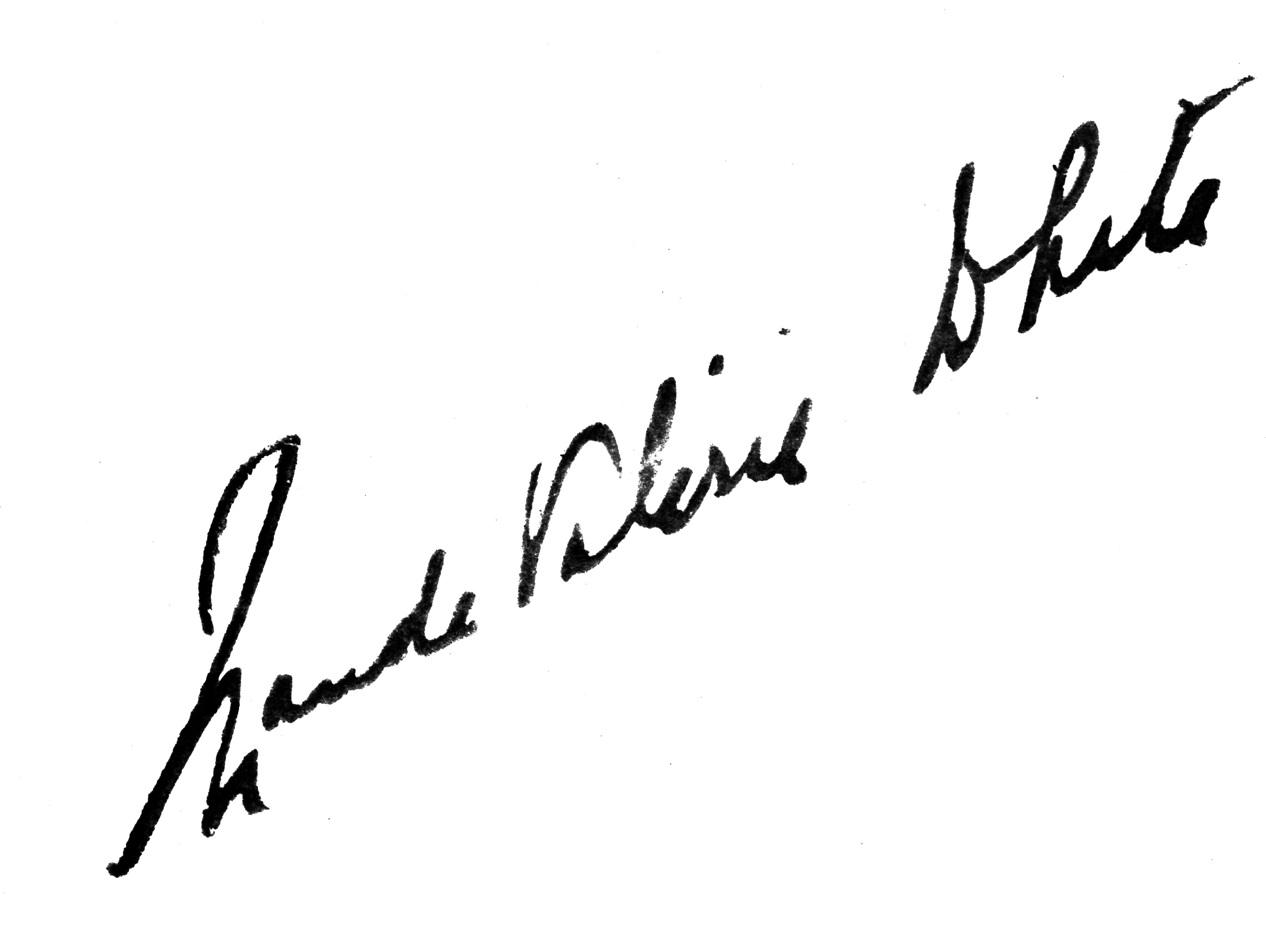

Maude Valérie White (1855 – 1937) was a French-born English composer who became one of the most successful songwriters of the Victorian period.

== Early years ==
Although born near Dieppe in Normandy to upper middle-class parents, White and her family moved to England when she was only one year old. She spent her childhood in Heidelberg, Paris, and England, and played the piano from an early age. At seventeen she had already composed her first song. She studied composition with Oliver May while in London, and counterpoint and harmony with W. S. Rockstro while living in Torquay. In 1876 White went to the Royal Academy of Music after she finally persuaded her reluctant mother to allow her to pursue music as a career. While at the academy she studied composition with George Alexander Macfarren, and set poems written in English, German, and French.

White was the first woman to be awarded the prestigious Mendelssohn Scholarship, which she received in 1879. Her father died while she was a child, but when White's mother died in 1881, White was devastated, and went to Chile to be with her sister and to recuperate and recover her health. Upon returning to London in 1882, she thrust herself into a career as a professional musician and composer. She made her way by teaching piano, and by writing songs and playing them at galas and soirées, sometimes presenting recitals with contralto, composer, and festival organizer Mary Augusta Wakefield.

== Composition ==
In 1883 White went to Vienna for six months to study with Robert Fuchs. He tried, unsuccessfully, to persuade her to extend her composition into more instrumental genres, a task which she never aggressively pursued. As Sophie Fuller notes, White's music during this period of her career is characterized "by careful word setting, expansive melodies, a sense of rhythmic propulsion and an avoidance of clear-cut cadences". This can be heard in her 1888 setting of Byron's "So we'll go no more a-roving", one of her most enduring songs, which is dedicated to Herbert Beerbohm Tree.

There are some larger scale works, such as the Russian-influenced ballet The Enchanted Heart of 1913, the orchestral Serbian Dances, performed during World War I by Henry Wood, and an unfinished opera, Smaranda. But it was her songs, setting poetry in German, French, Italian, Spanish and Swedish as well as English, that made her reputation as a composer. Her setting of Shelley's "My soul is an enchanted boat," published in 1882 has been described as "one of the best of our language". Among other successful titles were "Come to me in my dreams", "Ye cupids droop each little head", "Until (semper fidelis)", "Mary Morison" and "My soul is an enchanted boat".

Later in the 1890s her musical style developed and shifted to incorporate elements of music from her global travels. Increasingly White looked beyond the restrictions of the Victorian ballad, aspiring to the style of German Lieder. Past the turn of the century, her works become more impressionistic, as shown in "La Flûte Invisible" (Victor Hugo) and "Le Foyer" (Paul Verlaine).

== Later years and legacy ==
In her last years, White wrote two memoirs, Friends and Memories, published 1914, and My Indian Summer, published 1932. Her home was at 40 Pelham Court in Chelsea. She continued to organize concerts and perform her compositions but later turned more towards translating books and plays. She died at the age of 82 in 1937. A requiem mass was held for her at the Brompton Oratory and she was interred in the churchyard of St. Edward's Roman Catholic Church, Sutton Green, Surrey.

Roger Quilter and Vaughan Williams were both admirers of her songs. Stephen Banfield identifies White as "one of [Quilter's] closest stylistic predecessors", but classifies her as a composer of "drawing-room songs". Trevor Hold's assessment is that White "made a modest attempt in her songs to raise the artistic level of the ballad by a more adventurous choice of text and an avoidance of stock musical ideas".

== Discography ==
- Two of White's best-known songs, 'So we'll go no more a-roving' and 'Absent yet present', were recorded by the tenor Gervase Cary Elwes before World War I. Elwes and his wife were personal friends of the composer, who used to accompany him in concert: as he sang, "in her excitement she would begin galloping away towards the climax until sometimes it became quite a question which of them would arrive first".
- White's song 'To Mary' was recorded at least three times by the tenor Ben Davies, the first in 1903 and last in 1932.
- Women at an Exposition: Music Composed by Women and Performed at the 1893 World's Fair in Chicago, Koch International Classics, (1993). includes 'The Throstle' and 'Ici bas'
- In Praise of Woman, Hyperion CDH55159 (2004), includes 'The Throstle', 'My soul is an enchanted boat', 'The Devout Lover', and 'So we'll go no more a-roving', sung by Anthony Rolfe Johnson with Graham Johnson.
- The short piano suite 'From the Ionian Sea' was recorded by pianist Christopher Howell in 2012 and published as part of a compilation of English piano music inspired by Italy entitled An Englishman in Italy: British Piano Music inspired by Italy, Sheva Collection, 2012.
- Splendid Tears, EM Records EMRCD087 (2024), includes the 'Four songs from Tennyson’s In Memoriam', sung by Brian Thorsett with Richard Masters.
- Isaotta Blanzesman, and other Loves: Romanze, Lieder, Mélodies and Songs, Da Vinci Classics C01001 (2024), Elisabetta Paglia, Christopher Howell, includes 22 songs.

== Bibliography ==
- White, Maude Valerie. Friends and Memories. London: Edward Arnold, 1914.
- White, Maude Valerie. My Indian Summer. London: Grayson & Grayson, 1932.
