= Listed buildings in Arkholme-with-Cawood =

Arkholme-with-Cawood is a civil parish in Lancaster, Lancashire, England. It contains 30 listed buildings, which are recorded in the National Heritage List for England. Of these, one is listed at Grade II*, the middle grade, and the others are at Grade II. The parish contains the village of Arkholme, and is otherwise rural. Most of the listed buildings are houses and cottages in the village, or farmhouses and farm buildings in the surrounding countryside. The other listed buildings include a church with a cross base in its churchyard, a school, a public house, an animal pound, and a milestone.

== Key ==
Grade	Criteria
II*	Particularly important buildings of more than special interest
II	Buildings of national importance and special interest

== Buildings ==
Name and location	Photograph	Date	Notes	Grade
Cross base 54.14048°N 2.63034°W	—	Medieval	The cross base is in the churchyard of St John the Baptist's Church. It consists of an irregular sandstone boulder, and it has a socket for a shaft.	II
Poole House; 54.14175°N 2.63707°W	—	1674	A sandstone house with a slate roof that was extended in a similar style in 1860. It has two storeys, and the windows are mullioned. Above all the windows and doors are hood moulds. The doorway has an architrave and a lintel carved with rosettes, antlers, initials, and the date. On the left side is a segmental-headed coach entrance.	II
Green Bank Cottage; 54.14167°N 2.63580°W	—	Late 17th century	A stone house with a slate roof, in two storeys and three bays. The central doorway is approached by steps, and has a battlemented lintel. The windows are sashes, and a hood mould runs above the ground floor windows and rises over the doorway.	II
Kitlow Farmhouse and barn 54.14461°N 2.66926°W	—	1676	The farmhouse is in stone with a tiled roof, and has two storeys. The windows were originally mullioned, but most mullions have been lost. Above the doorway is a battlemented lintel inscribed with the date and initials. The sandstone barn was added to the left in the 19th century, and has various openings.	II
Rose Cottage and Glen Cross; 54.14157°N 2.63609°W	—	1690	A two-storey stone house with a slate roof, the older part being Rose Cottage. This has three bays, and a central doorway with a battlemented lintel inscribed with dates and initials. Glenn Cross was probably added in 1868, and is in a single bay. The windows are sashes.	II
Willow Cottage; 54.14209°N 2.63801°W	—	1693	A stone house with a slate roof, in two storeys and with a symmetrical front of four bays. Above the central doorway is an inscribed lintel, and the windows are mullioned. Above the ground floor windows and the doorway is a hood mould.	II
Cort House; 54.14124°N 2.63384°W	—	1700	The house is in stone with a slate roof, and has two storeys and three bays. Above the central doorway is an inscribed lintel, and over that is a sandstone flag forming a hood. The windows have been altered.	II
Brown Edge Farmhouse and barn 54.15718°N 2.67498°W	—	1713	The farmhouse is in stone with a slate roof, it is in two storeys and two bays. The windows are mullioned, and the doorway has a battlemented lintel inscribed with the date and initials. The barn adjoining to the left was added later; it has two doorways, a pitching hole, and a buttress.	II
Storrs Hall Cottage; 54.13717°N 2.65119°W	—	1713	The sandstone house has a slate roof, two storeys and three bays. On the front is a blocked doorway, above which is an inscribed plaque. At the rear are two gabled wings. The windows are mullioned.	II
Lune Cottage; 54.13933°N 2.63179°W	—	1714	A sandstone house with a slate roof, it has two storeys and three bays. The central doorway has a battlemented lintel inscribed with the date and initials. The windows are mullioned.	II
Red Load Farmhouse; 54.14722°N 2.66723°W	—	1722	The stone house has a slate roof, it is in two storeys, and has a three-bay front. The central doorway has an architrave, and above it is an inscribed plaque. The windows are mullioned.	II
Cawood House; 54.14110°N 2.63339°W		1748	The original part of the house is in sandstone with a slate roof. It has two storeys with an attic and a front of two bays. Above the central doorway is an inscribed lintel and a hood of two stone flags. The windows have three lights and are mullioned. To the right is gabled extension dating from the early 20th century.	II
Chapel House; 54.14091°N 2.63143°W		18th century	The oldest part of the house is the rear wing, the front range dating probably from the 19th century. The house is in sandstone with slate roofs, and has two storeys. The rear wing contains a mullioned window, and most of the other windows in the house are sashes. The front range has two bays and there is a later bay to the right.	II
Gowan Hall Farmhouse and barn 54.13269°N 2.66112°W	—	Mid-18th century	The farmhouse is in stone with a slate roof. It has two storeys and two bays with mullioned windows. The barn was added in the 19th century. It is in sandstone with a stone-slate roof.	II
Reading Room Cottage; 54.14170°N 2.63594°W	—	Mid-18th century	A stone house with a slate roof in two storeys and two bays. The windows and door have plain stone surrounds, and steps lead up to the doorway. The windows have been altered.	II
Storrs Gate Farmhouse and barn 54.13762°N 2.64966°W	—	Mid-18th century	The building is in sandstone with a slate roof and has two storeys. The original part of the house has two bays and mullioned windows. The later bay, to the left, has sash windows. The barn, on the right, is higher, and has doorways, some of which are blocked.	II
Goss House; 54.14197°N 2.63666°W	—	1752	A stone house with a slate roof, which contains some 17th-century fabric. It has two storeys and a symmetrical three-bay front. The central doorway has an architrave with a carved keystone, a frieze, and a dentiled pediment containing an inscription. The windows have architraves, and are mullioned.	II
Cross House; 54.14059°N 2.63183°W	—	1772	A pebbledashed stone house with a slate roof, in two storeys and two bays. The windows are sashes, and above the doorway is a plaque inscribed with the date and initials.	II
Gunnerthwaite Farmhouse; 54.15310°N 2.67771°W	—	Late 18th century	The farmhouse is in sandstone with a slate roof, it has two storeys and a front of two bays. On the front is a Tuscan porch. At the rear is a semicircular-headed doorway approached by eight external steps; this is flanked by Doric pilasters, and it has an open pediment. The windows are sashes.	II
Higher Broomfield Farmhouse; 54.14988°N 2.62021°W	—	Late 18th century	A sandstone farmhouse with a slate roof, it has two storeys and two bays. The central doorway has a plain stone surround. On the front are three-light stepped mullioned windows.	II
St John the Baptist's Church; 54.14063°N 2.63044°W		1788	This was the rebuilding of an earlier church on the site, and it was restored by Austin and Paley in 1899, replacing Georgian windows with windows in Perpendicular style. The church is built in sandstone with a stone-slate roof, and consists of a nave with a south aisle, a chancel, a vestry, and a south porch. There is a bellcote with a segmental roof on the west gable.	II*
Bay Horse Hotel; 54.14365°N 2.63960°W		c. 1800	A public house in rendered stone with a slate roof. It has two storeys and a two-bay front with chamfered quoins. In the centre is a gabled porch. Apart from one sash window, the other windows have been replaced.	II
Smithy Cottage, The Forge, and the former smithy 54.14376°N 2.64004°W	—	c. 1817	Two cottages and a former smithy, in stone with slate roofs, and with two storeys. Smithy Cottage, to the left, has sash windows. The Forge, in the middle, has a ground floor doorway and a flight of external steps leading up to a first floor doorway. The former smithy has a wide opening with a timber lintel, and a door and window to the right.	II
Carnalea and garage 54.14273°N 2.63924°W	—	Early 19th century	A sandstone house with a stone-slate roof in two storeys and with two bays. The windows are sashes, and the door has a plain surround. To the left is an extension, also with two storeys, but lower. This has a slate roof, and two wide segmental-headed arches, one of which has been converted into windows.	II
Undercroft; 54.14252°N 2.63888°W	—	Early to mid-19th century	The house is in stone with a slate roof, and has two storeys and two bays. The doorway has a plain surround, and the windows are sashes. To the left of the doorway is a blocked doorway.	II
Storrs Hall; 54.13636°N 2.65038°W		1848	A country house incorporating the core of an earlier house. It is in sandstone with a slate roof, and is in Gothic style. There is a four-storey embattled tower with a taller octagonal turret, in front of which is a Tudor-style two-storey house with a symmetrical front. The outer bays are gabled and project, and between them are two bays that contain a Tudor arched doorway. The windows are mullioned and tramsomed.	II
Brunt Hill; 54.14132°N 2.63502°W	—	Mid-19th century (probable)	A stone house with a slate roof in two storeys. The main part of the house has two bays with a central doorway, and to the left is another bay, containing a garage door. The windows are sashes.	II
Milestone; 54.14880°N 2.63319°W	—	Mid-19th century	The milestone is in sandstone and has a triangular plan. Its sloping top is inscribed "ARKHOLME", and the faces are inscribed with the distances in miles to Kirkby Lonsdale, Carnforth, and Lancaster.	II
Primary school 54.14315°N 2.63924°W	—	1867–68	The school and master's house were designed by E. G. Paley. They are in sandstone with slate roofs. The school has one storey and attics, with a projecting gabled wing to the right. It contains triple stepped lancet windows and two timber dormers. The house, to the right, has two storeys and one bay, and its windows are mullioned.	II
Village pound 54.14062°N 2.63133°W	—	Uncertain	The pound is built in sandstone and river cobbles. It consists of two compartments, and the walls are about 1.5 metres (4 ft 11 in) high. There is an entrance to each compartment, one of which has a lintel.	II
