= St Thomas' Church, Crosscrake =

Coordinates: 54.2764°N 2.7330°W

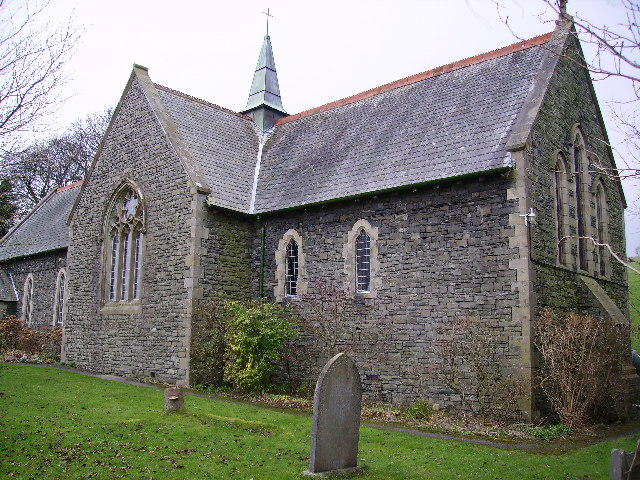
- St Thomas' Church, Crosscrake, from the southeast

- Location in Cumbria
- OS grid reference: SD 52367 86997
- Location: Crosscrake, Cumbria
- Country: England
- Denomination: Anglican
- Website: St Thomas, Crosscrake

History
- Status: Parish church

Architecture
- Functional status: Active
- Architect: Paley and Austin
- Architectural type: Church
- Style: Gothic Revival
- Groundbreaking: 1874
- Completed: 1875

Specifications
- Materials: Slate

Administration
- Province: York
- Diocese: Carlisle
- Archdeaconry: Westmorland and Furness
- Deanery: Kendal
- Parish: St Thomas, Crosscrake

Clergy
- Vicar: Terry Wilcock

St Thomas' Church is in the village of Crosscrake, Cumbria, England. It is an active Anglican parish church in the Deanery of Kendal, the Archdeaconry of Westmorland and Furness, and the Diocese of Carlisle.

The church was built in 1874–75, and was designed by the Lancaster architects Paley and Austin. It has since been modified but retains its Gothic Revival style.

== History ==
The Paley and Austin building replaced an earlier church of 1773, and cost about £3,000 (equivalent to £300,000 in 2025). The church was supported by the Wakefield family of Sedgwick House, another Paley and Austin building in the parish. In 1885, composer Mary Augusta Wakefield and her sister Agnes organized a music festival to raise money for St. Thomas'. The festival continues today as Mary Wakefield Westmorland Festival (but no longer supports St. Thomas').

The internal furnishings are also by Paley and Austin. The church was provided with an organ by Wilkinson of Kendal which was rebuilt in the 1980s by the East Anglian firm Holmes & Swift. The stained glass in the east window dates from about 1890, and is by Clayton and Bell.

== Modifications ==
Because of structural failure, the tower was reduced in 1944, and then removed completely in 1963. A shallow transept was made to disguise this, and a spirelet was added.

== Administration ==
Its benefice was united with that of St Patrick, Preston Patrick, although the latter parish is now served by the Kirkby Lonsdale team ministry, whereas Crosscrake is in a group of parishes in the Kendal area (the Helm group).

== See also ==
- List of ecclesiastical works by Paley and Austin
