= William Wakefield (cricketer) =

English cricketer

Personal information
- Full name: William Henry Wakefield
- Born: 20 May 1870; Kendal, Westmorland, England
- Died: 7 August 1922 (aged 52); Chesham, Buckinghamshire, England
- Batting: Unknown
- Role: Wicket-keeper

Career statistics
Competition	First-class
Matches	13
Runs scored	75
Batting average	8.33
100s/50s	–/–
Top score	19*
Catches/stumpings	18/6
- Source: Cricinfo, 29 July 2019

William Henry Wakefield (20 May 1870 – 7 August 1922) was an English first-class cricketer.

The son of William Henry Wakefield of Sedgwick House and his wife, Augusta Hagarty, he was born at Kendal in May 1870. He was the brother of Mary Augusta Wakefield. He was educated at Charterhouse School, before going up to New College at the University of Oxford. While at Oxford, he played rugby union for Oxford University. He toured the West Indies with R. S. Lucas' XI in 1894–95, making his debut in first-class cricket on the tour against Barbados at Bridgetown. He made five further first-class appearances on the tour, scoring 30 runs with a high score of 16. Playing as the touring party's wicket-keeper, Wakefield also took 10 catches and made 5 stumpings. Two years later he again toured the West Indies, this time with Lord Hawke's XI, with Wakefield making seven first-class appearances on the tour. He scored 45 runs on the tour, with a high score of 19 not out. As the team's wicket-keeper, he took 8 catches and made a single stumping. He died at Chesham in August 1922.
