= Listed buildings in Gressingham =

Gressingham is a civil parish in Lancaster, Lancashire, England. It contains 14 listed buildings that are recorded in the National Heritage List for England. Of these, one is listed at Grade I, the highest of the three grades, two are at Grade II*, the middle grade, and the others are at Grade II, the lowest grade. Apart from the village of Gressingham and the settlement of Eskrigge, the parish is rural. Almost all the listed buildings are houses and associated structures, farmhouses, and farm buildings. Also listed are a church and a bridge crossing the River Lune on the boundary of the parish.

== Key ==
Grade	Criteria
I	Buildings of exceptional interest, sometimes considered to be internationally important
II*	Particularly important buildings of more than special interest
II	Buildings of national importance and special interest

== Buildings ==
Name and location	Photograph	Date	Notes	Grade
St John's Church; 54.12327°N 2.65557°W		12th century	The church was partly rebuilt in Perpendicular style in 1734, and restored in 1862 by E. G. Paley. It is in sandstone with stone-slate roofs, and consists of a nave with a clerestory, a north aisle, a chancel with a north chapel, and a west tower. The tower is in three stages, with a west window, clasping pilaster strips, and a solid parapet with moulded coping.	I
Loyn Bridge; 54.12173°N 2.64159°W		c. 1600 (possibly)	The bridge was built to replace an earlier one that had become dangerous, and carries Fleet Lane over the River Lune. It is in sandstone and consists of three segmental arches with cutwaters, and refuges for pedestrians. It has solid parapets with rounded coping. The bridge is also a scheduled monument.	II*
Eskrigge Hall; 54.11766°N 2.66036°W	—	Late 17th century	This is a pebbledashed stone house with a slate roof in two storeys. The doorway has a rendered surround, and the windows are mullioned.	II
Low House Farmhouse; 54.11542°N 2.66600°W	—	Late 17th century	A stone house with a stone-slate roof in two storeys, with a main block of two bays. Some of the windows are mullioned, others are sashes. The doorway has a 20th-century porch, moulded jambs, and a chamfered lintel. To the right is an additional bay.	II
Gressingham Hall and stables 54.12326°N 2.65484°W	—	1688	A country house that was extended in the 18th century. It is in sandstone with a stone-slate roof, and has an L-shaped plan. The original block has two storeys and an attic, and a front of five bays. The windows are mullioned, and the door has a moulded surround and a shaped lintel. To the right is a two-bay extension that has mullioned and sash windows, and a porch with pilasters. Further to the right is a former coach house and stable, now incorporated into the house.	II*
Crow Trees; 54.12272°N 2.65729°W	—	1690	A stone house with a slate roof, in two storeys and four bays. The windows are mullioned. In the third bay is a porch behind which is a doorway with a moulded surround. Above it is a battlemented lintel inscribed with initials and the date, and over that is a shield carved with a horn.	II
Sandbeds Farmhouse; 54.11190°N 2.65846°W	—	c. 1700	A sandstone house with a slate roof, in a T-shaped plan. The house has two storeys, and the main block has three bays, sash windows, and a door with a moulded surround and a shaped lintel. Some of the windows in the cross-wing have retained their mullions.	II
Gate piers in garden, Gressingham Hall; 54.12300°N 2.65473°W	—	Early 18th century	The gate piers are in the garden to the south of the hall, and are said to have been moved from The Biggins near Kirkby Lonsdale. They are in rusticated sandstone, with a square plan, and a moulded cornice. On the north face of each is an Ionic pilaster with a shell carved in the entablature.	II
Gate piers on roadside, Gressingham Hall; 54.12344°N 2.65465°W	—	Mid 18th century	The gate piers are at the entrance to the drive to the north of the hall. They are in sandstone with a square plan, and each pier has a pulvinated frieze, a moulded cornice, and a moulded base.	II
Eskrigge House; 54.11841°N 2.66042°W	—	Mid 18th century (probable)	The house contains remains from the 17th century, and it was altered later. It is in sandstone with a slate roof, and has two storeys and three bays. The windows are mullioned, and the former doorway, now converted into a window, has a battlemented lintel. The current doorway is to the right, and has a gabled stone porch.	II
Barn, Low House Farm; 54.11522°N 2.66594°W	—	1786	The barn is in sandstone with a stone-slate roof. On the front is a wide entrance with a segmental arch, and a doorway to the right. Above the arch is a plaque inscribed with initials and the date.	II
Box Tree Farmhouse; 54.12333°N 2.65952°W	—	Early 19th century	A sandstone house with a slate roof in two storeys. The main part has two bays, sash windows, and a central door with a plain stone surround. To the left is an additional bay, possibly converted from an agricultural building.	II
Barn, Eskrigge House; 54.11824°N 2.66045°W	—	Early 19th century	The barn is in sandstone with a slate roof. On the north wall is a wide entrance and a doorway. Some of the quoins are carved with 'Celtic' heads.	II
Church Bank; 54.12343°N 2.65641°W	—	1830	A sandstone house with a slate roof, in two storeys and two bays. The windows are sashes. The doorway has a plain surround, and above it is an inscribed plaque in the shape of a shield.	II
