= Lakeland Maze Farm Park =

Coordinates: 54°16′28.79″N 2°44′24.93″W

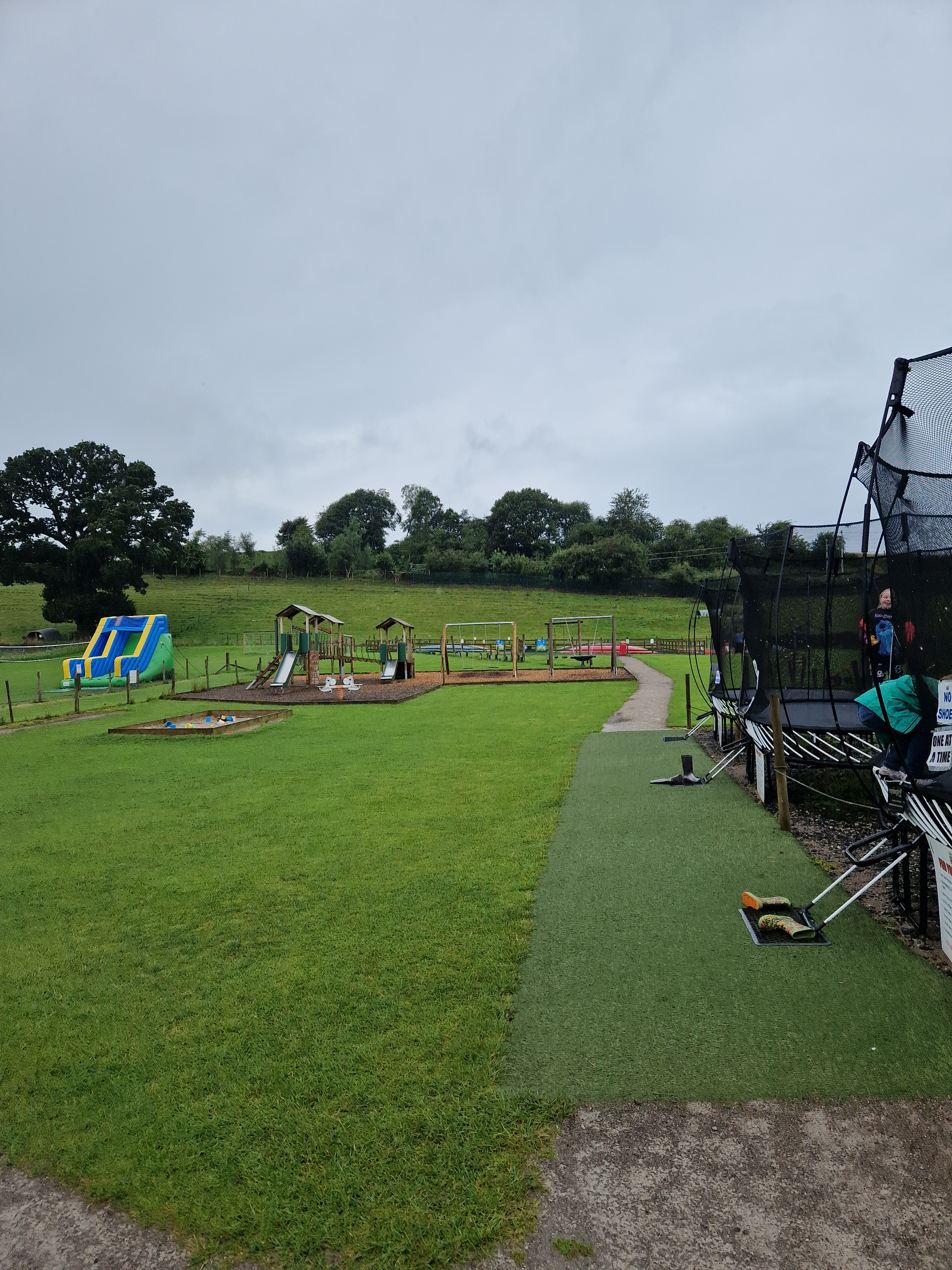
Lakeland Maze Farm Park

Lakeland Maze Farm Park is an outdoor attraction and maze located near Kendal in England, UK.

== History ==
The first maze was created in 2005. In 2021, the maze was moved to a new field.

== Theme ==
Year	Theme	Notes
2015	Dinosaurs	
2017	Star Wars	
2018	Owl	
2019	Space	
2020	Alice in Wonderland	For the 200th anniversary of the birth of John Tenniel
2021	Sunflower	
