= Arkholme-with-Cawood =

Civil parish in Lancashire, England

Coordinates: 54.144°N 2.642°W

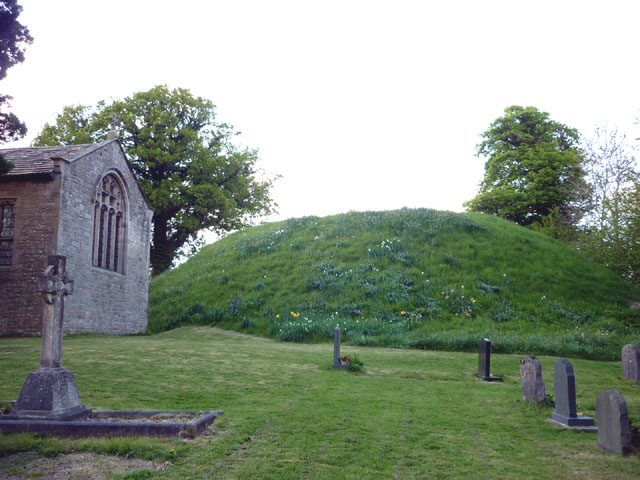
- Arkholme motte and the west end of the Church of St John the Baptist

- Location in the City of Lancaster district Location within Lancashire
- Population: 333 (2011)
- OS grid reference: SD581721
- Civil parish: Arkholme-with-Cawood
- District: Lancaster
- Shire county: Lancashire
- Region: North West
- Country: England
- Sovereign state: United Kingdom
- Post town: CARNFORTH
- Postcode district: LA6
- Dialling code: 01524
- Police: Lancashire
- Fire: Lancashire
- Ambulance: North West
- UK Parliament: Morecambe & Lunesdale

Arkholme-with-Cawood is a civil parish of the City of Lancaster in Lancashire, England. The parish of Arkholme-with-Cawood had a population of 334 recorded in the 2001 census, falling marginally to 333 at the 2011 Census. The parish is north east of Lancaster and lies on the B6254 road.

== History ==
Arkholme is a small village forming part of a cluster of sites along the Lune Valley, each with evidence of a motte – as with Melling and Whittington. Arkholme has no surviving bailey. This is the densest distribution of Norman castles outside of the Welsh border countryside.

It was served by the Furness and Midland Joint Railway line, until 1960. A tunnel took the line from Wennington (where it connected with the Midland Railway) to Melling, the next station being at Arkholme.

== Thankful Village ==
Arkholme is one of only two Thankful Villages in Lancashire – those rare places that suffered no fatalities during the Great War of 1914 to 1918. This small village sent by far the largest number from one village and parish off to war – 59. It is remarkable that all 59 returned to their homes. A nearby village, Nether Kellet, 5 miles to the south west, sent 21 men and it, too, is a Thankful Village – all their men returned. The village is featured on Darren Hayman's album, Thankful Villages Volume 2.

According to an article on the BBC website (), Arkholme and Nether Kellet were also doubly Thankful Villages, having lost no men in either world war. This latter detail is questionable, as there is a memorial in St John's Church, Arkholme that commemorates Leading Stoker Harold Edward Newby, who was from Arkholme and who was Killed in Action when HMS Repulse was sunk off Singapore on 10 December 1941.

Arkholme Village Hall, designed by Mason Gillibrand Architects of Caton, Lancaster, was completed in 2004 and won an RICS Community Benefit Award in 2005.

== Cawood ==
Cawood was originally the forest owned by the Lords of Hornby, hence the "wood" in its name.

== Broadband ==
Arkholme was one of the first places connected to the Broadband 4 Rural North high speed broadband network.

== Notable people ==
The actor Harriet Webb grew up in Arkholme.

== See also ==
- Listed buildings in Arkholme-with-Cawood
