= Loyn Bridge =

Bridge in Lancashire, England

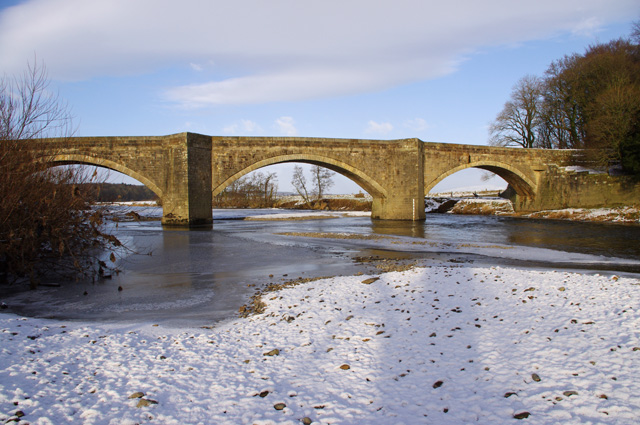
- Coordinates: 54.12175°N 2.64157°W
- Carries: Minor road
- Crosses: River Lune
- Locale: Gressingham and Hornby-with-Farleton, Lancashire, England
- Other name(s): Loyne Bridge

Characteristics
- Material: Sandstone
- No. of spans: 3

Listed Building – Grade II*
- Official name: Loyne Bridge
- Designated: 4 October 1967
- Reference no.: 1071682

Scheduled monument
- Official name: Loyn Bridge
- Reference no.: 1003129

Loyn Bridge (or Loyne Bridge) crosses the River Lune, carrying a minor road between the villages of Hornby and Gressingham in Lancashire, England. The present bridge replaces an older bridge, which is thought to have been constructed with timber decking between stone piers. There is evidence that the river was forded here before a bridge was built. The date of the building of the present bridge is unknown; it is considered to have been after 1591, when the previous bridge was described as being "in a dangerous condition". A date of 1684 has been suggested, but petitions regarding the bridge put before the Quarter Sessions between 1650 and 1750 make no mention of a new bridge between these dates. The bridge was paid for by the County of Lancashire, and later the responsibility for maintenance and repairs was transferred to the Lonsdale Hundred.

The bridge is constructed in sandstone blocks, and consists of three segmental arches with triangular cutwaters containing refuges for pedestrians. The arches measure 53 feet (16.2 m), 62 feet 6 inches (19.1 m) and 52 feet (15.8 m) respectively. The carriageway is 12 feet (3.7 m) wide, and the maximum width of the bridge at the points of the piers is 33 feet 6 inches (10.2 m). It is described as being "surprisingly impressive for a route that has little significance nowadays". When the bridge was surveyed in 1998, it was found to be adequate to carry vehicles of 40 tonnes. It is recorded in the National Heritage List for England as a designated Grade II* listed building, and is a scheduled monument.

Loyn Bridge was damaged during Storm Desmond on 5 December 2015. Further damage due to debris caused the bridge to be closed for an extended period. Extensive temporary protection for the bridge and bank were required, along with infill in the bridge piers. The bridge finally reopened on 22 April 2016. Even after the bridge repairs, significant damage to the hedges and fences along the road between the bridge and Gressingham is apparent.

== See also ==
- Grade II* listed buildings in Lancashire
- Listed buildings in Gressingham
- Scheduled monuments in Lancashire
