= Sedgwick, Cumbria =

Village and civil parish in Cumbria, England

Coordinates: 54.280°N 2.746°W

Sedgwick
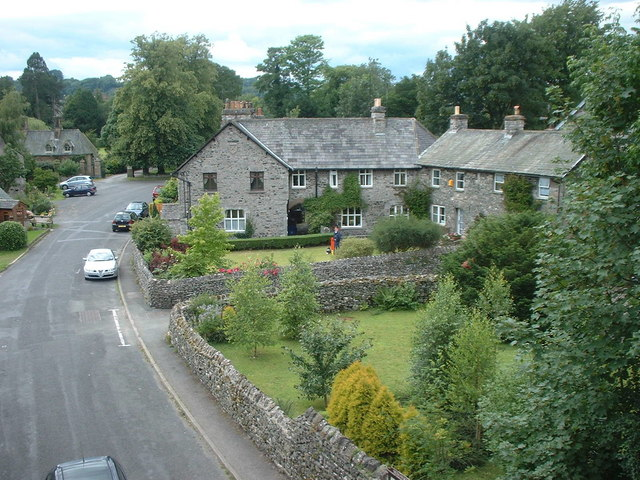
- Sedgwick village

- Location in South Lakeland Location within Cumbria
- Population: 349 (2011)
- OS grid reference: SD508878
- Civil parish: Sedgwick
- Unitary authority: Westmorland and Furness
- Ceremonial county: Cumbria
- Region: North West
- Country: England
- Sovereign state: United Kingdom
- Post town: KENDAL
- Postcode district: LA8
- Dialling code: 015395
- Police: Cumbria
- Fire: Cumbria
- Ambulance: North West
- UK Parliament: Westmorland and Lonsdale

Sedgwick is a village and civil parish in Cumbria, England, 4.5 miles (7.2 km) south of Kendal. In the 2001 census the parish had a population of 380, decreasing at the 2011 census to 349.

Part of the historic county of Westmorland, its main points of interest are 2 Grade II listed buildings:

- Sedgwick House, built in 1868 by Paley and Austin for the industrialist William Henry Wakefield
- An aqueduct belonging to the drained section of the Lancaster Canal

Sizergh Castle & Garden and Levens Hall are just west of the village.

The gunpowder works in Sedgwick, powered by water from the River Kent, operated to 1935. The Lakeland Maze Farm Park is east of the village.

== See also ==
- Listed buildings in Sedgwick, Cumbria
