= Whittington Hall =

Listed building in Lancashire, England

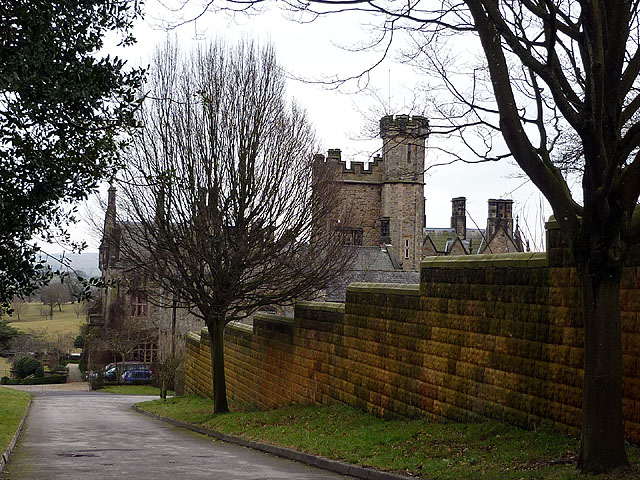

- Location within the City of Lancaster district

General information
- Architectural style: Jacobethan
- Location: Whittington, Lancashire, England
- Coordinates: 54.1804°N 2.6200°W
- Construction started: 1831
- Completed: 1836
- Client: Thomas Greene (MP)

Design and construction
- Architect: George Webster 1832

Listed Building – Grade II*
- Official name: Whittington Hall
- Designated: 4 October 1967
- Reference no.: 1362568

Whittington Hall is a country house located to the west of the village of Whittington, Lancashire, England, some 3 km (2 miles) south of Kirkby Lonsdale. The house is recorded in the National Heritage List for England as a designated Grade II* listed building.

It is constructed in sandstone rubble, with a slate roof, and is in Jacobethan style. The building incorporates a battlemented tower with an octagonal corner turret.

== History ==
It was built between 1831 and 1836 on the site of an earlier house to a design by George Webster for Thomas Greene, M.P. On Greene's death in 1872 it passed to his eldest son, Army Officer Dawson Cornelius Greene (1822–87), who retired to live in London and was succeeded by his son, Henry Dawson Dawson-Greene.

In 1887 the Lancaster architects Paley and Austin arranged alterations, including a billiard room, another staircase, and a garden loggia. The drawing room and dining room were remodelled in Georgian style in the 1930s.

Henry died in 1912 at Whittington leaving two daughters, Mary Sybil and Violet Margaret (died 1988) (who married Thomas Anson, 4th Earl of Lichfield). His son Charles was killed in the First World War.

== See also ==
- Grade II* listed buildings in Lancashire
- Listed buildings in Whittington, Lancashire
- List of works by George Webster
- List of non-ecclesiastical works by Paley and Austin
