= William Henry Wakefield =

English banker

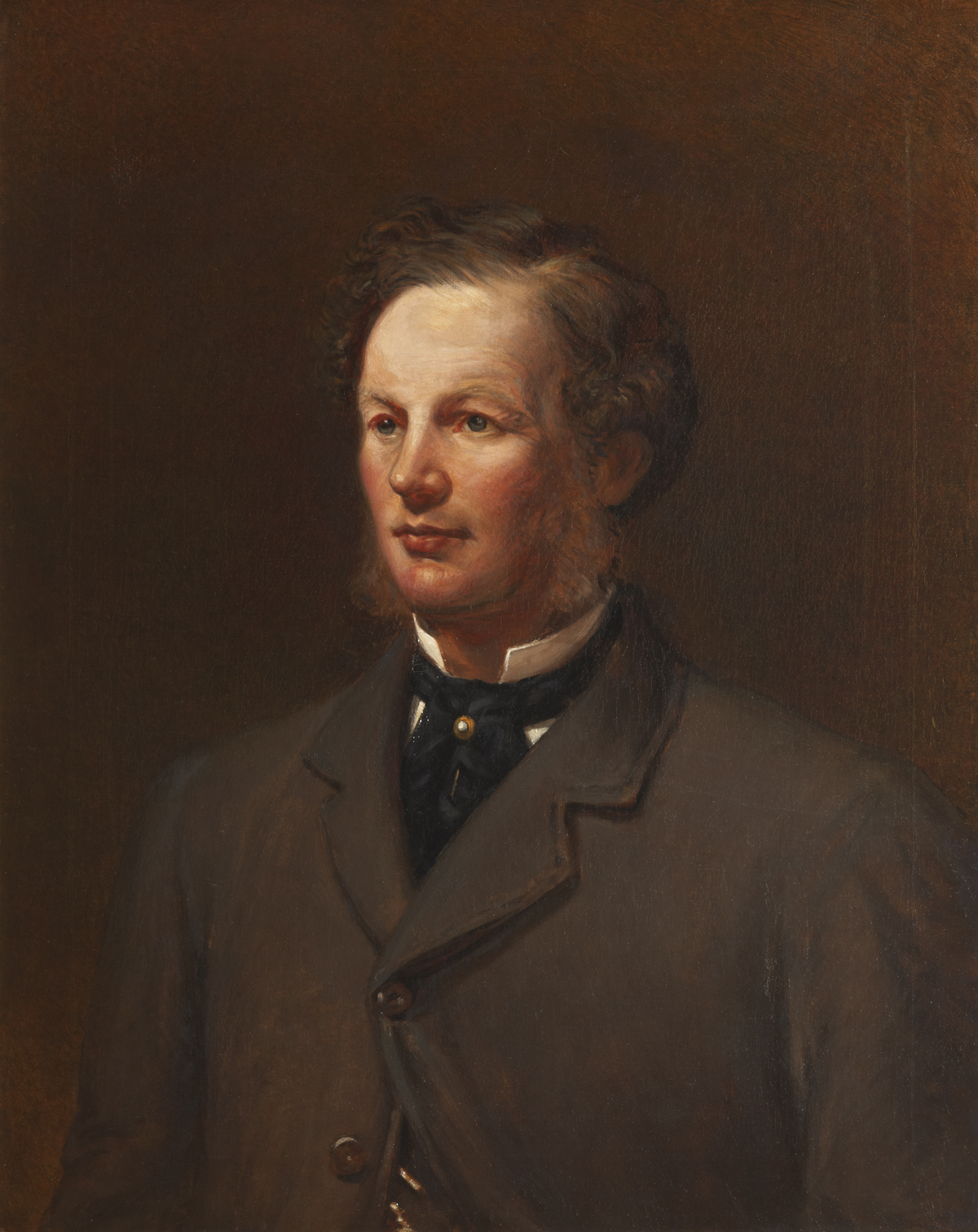
- William Henry Wakefield, 1870 portrait by William Menzies Tweedie
- Born: 18 May 1828; Broughton Lodge near Cartmel
- Died: 1889 (aged 60–61)
- Occupation: Banker
- Spouse: Augusta Hagarty
- Children: 4 sons, 3 daughters Mary Augusta Wakefield, William Wakefield

William Henry Wakefield (1828–1889) was an English banker. Wakefield was a partner in Wakefield Crewdson & Co., the family bank in to which his father brought him. He became the senior partner of the bank in 1864. Through the bank he was involved in railways and gunpowder manufacturing.

== Early years ==
He belonged to the Kendal banking family of Wakefield, as the son of John Wakefield III. The Wakefields were Quakers, but his father had been disowned by the Kendal Society of Friends on marrying an Anglican. He was born at Broughton Lodge near Cartmel, on 18 May 1828, one of six children of John Wakefield and Fanny McArthur of Glasgow.

== Career ==
Wakefield was a partner in Wakefield Crewdson & Co., the family bank to which his father brought him in, during 1850; and a gunpowder manufacturer. In 1863 the Wakefield family took on a majority share of the bank; in 1864 Wakefield became the senior partner.

Wakefield was a director of the South Durham and Lancashire Union Railway, a cross-Pennine venture to connect Furness to the north-east in which Kendal men were well represented. He was also a landowner, with over 5000 acres in Westmorland in 1873.

In 1858 Wakefield built a house at Prizett, 2.5 miles south of Kendal. After his father's death in 1866, he had a 7/16 share of the bank, and set about building Sedgwick House, nearby. It replaced the old house of the same name, just to the north-west on the same site. He also supported the building of St Thomas' Church, Crosscrake, which used the same architects, Paley and Austin, as Sedgwick House. With Sir Francis Powell he succeeding in turning round Sedbergh School, when it was close to collapse.

== Death ==
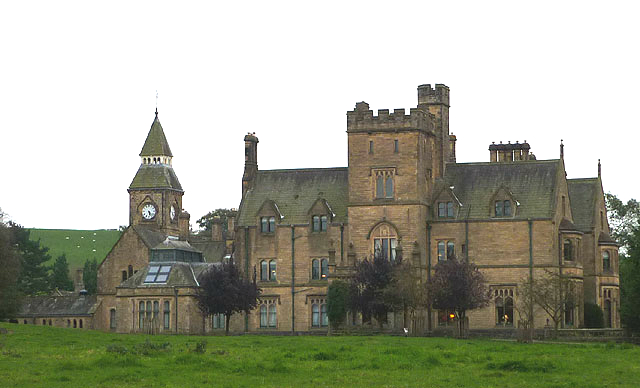
Sedgwick House, Cumbria

Wakefield died while hunting. The gunpowder company W. H. Wakefield & Co. continued into the 20th century. The Kendal bank was bought by the Bank of Liverpool in 1893.

== Family ==
He married Augusta, daughter of James Hagarty, US Consul at Liverpool. Their children, four sons and three daughters, they included the cricketer William Wakefield (1870–1922) and Mary Augusta Wakefield (1853–1910), organiser of music festivals.
