= Whittington, Lancashire =

Village located in Lancaster, England

Coordinates: 54.180°N 2.613°W

Whittington: Whittington
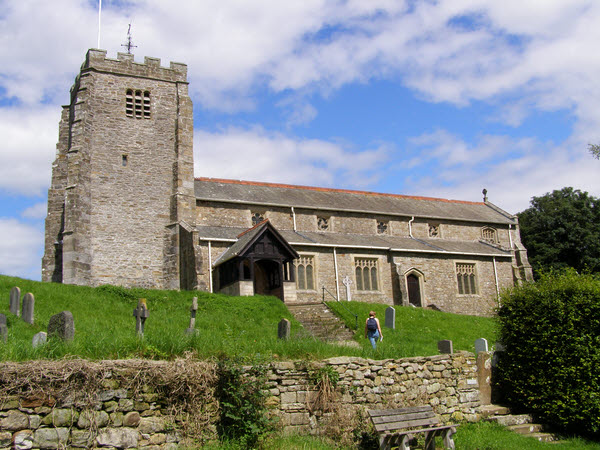
- St Michael's Church

- Shown within Lancaster district Location within Lancashire
- Area: 17.87 km^{2} (6.90 sq mi)
- Population: 375 (Parish, 2011)
  - Density: 21/km^{2} (54/sq mi)
- OS grid reference: SD600762
- Civil parish: Whittington
- District: Lancaster
- Shire county: Lancashire
- Region: North West
- Country: England
- Sovereign state: United Kingdom
- Post town: Carnforth
- Postcode district: LA6
- Dialling code: 01524
- Police: Lancashire
- Fire: Lancashire
- Ambulance: North West
- UK Parliament: Morecambe and Lunesdale

Whittington is a small village and civil parish in Lancashire, England with a population of 375.". It is in the Upper Lune Valley ward of Lancaster City Council and the Lancaster Rural East division of Lancashire County Council.

Whittington forms part of a cluster of sites along the Lune valley, each with evidence of a motte – as with Melling and Arkholme. This is the densest distribution of Norman castles outside the Welsh border countryside.

St Michael's Church dates from the 13th century.

Whittington Hall is a large 5-acre (20,000 m^{2}) estate surrounding a grand hall with many outbuildings. It was rebuilt in 1840, by Thomas Greene, M.P. for Lancaster.

== See also ==
- Listed buildings in Whittington, Lancashire.
