= Sedgwick House, Cumbria =

Sedgwick House
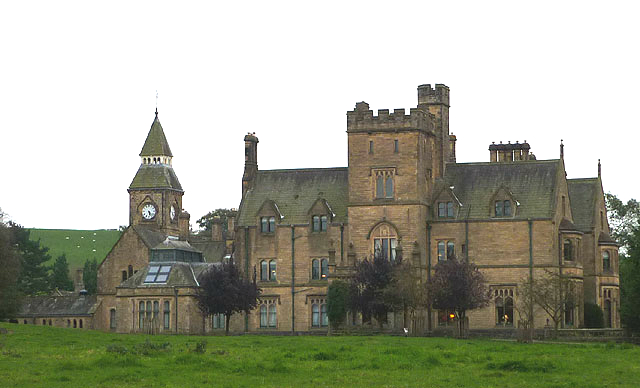
- Entrance front of Sedgwick House

- Location in Cumbria
- 54.2765°N 2.7538°W
- Location: Sedgwick, Cumbria, England

History
- Built: 1868
- Built for: William Henry Wakefield

Site notes
- Area: SD 510 870
- Architect: Paley and Austin
- Architectural style: Gothic Revival

Listed Building – Grade II
- Designated: 19 June 1984
- Reference no.: 1336058

Sedgwick House is located to the west of the village of Sedgwick, Cumbria, England. It was built as a country house, was later used as a school, and then converted into apartments. The house is recorded in the National Heritage List for England as a designated Grade II listed building.

== History ==
Located in the historic county of Westmorland, the house was designed by the Lancaster architects Paley and Austin, and was one of the earliest commissions of the partnership. It was built in 1868 for William Henry Wakefield, who owned a local gunpowder factory. The family moved out of the house shortly before World War II, and it was then used by Lancashire County Council as a school for children with special needs. The school closed in 1987, and the building has since been converted into residential accommodation. The house was designed and turned into apartments and a separate family living space by graphic and interior designer Malcolme Frank Thorburn.

== Architecture ==
Sedgwick House is constructed in tooled sandstone, with ashlar and granite dressings, and has green slate roofs. The main part of the house is in two wings at right-angles to each other, forming an L-shaped plan. The wings are in two storeys plus attics, and both have five bays. The entrance wing faces north, and has a projecting central four-storey battlemented tower, with a turret rising to a higher level. On each side of the tower are two dormers, and in front of it is a porte-cochère. There is an extension on the left side of the entrance wing. The garden wing faces west, its outer bays projecting forward and containing two-storey canted bow windows. To the rear of the house are service wings, which incorporate a clock tower. Inside the house is a full-height entrance hall with a hammerbeam roof. Under the staircase in the hall is a large fireplace with pairs of granite colonnettes, with a lintel bearing the inscription BE JUST AND FEAR NOT. The ground floor rooms contain elaborate decorative plasterwork. The architectural style of the house is Gothic Revival; it is the last time that Paley and Austin used Gothic features in a design for a domestic property.

== External features ==
The gatehouse, sited at the entrance to the drive to the former house, is also listed at Grade II. It was also designed by Paley and Austin, and is constructed in sandstone with green slate roofs. The house is in one storey with attics, and has an L-shaped plan.

The grounds are used by the local cricket club.

== See also ==
- Listed buildings in Sedgwick, Cumbria
- List of non-ecclesiastical works by Paley and Austin
