= Chris Webb =

British politician (born 1986)

Chris Webb MP
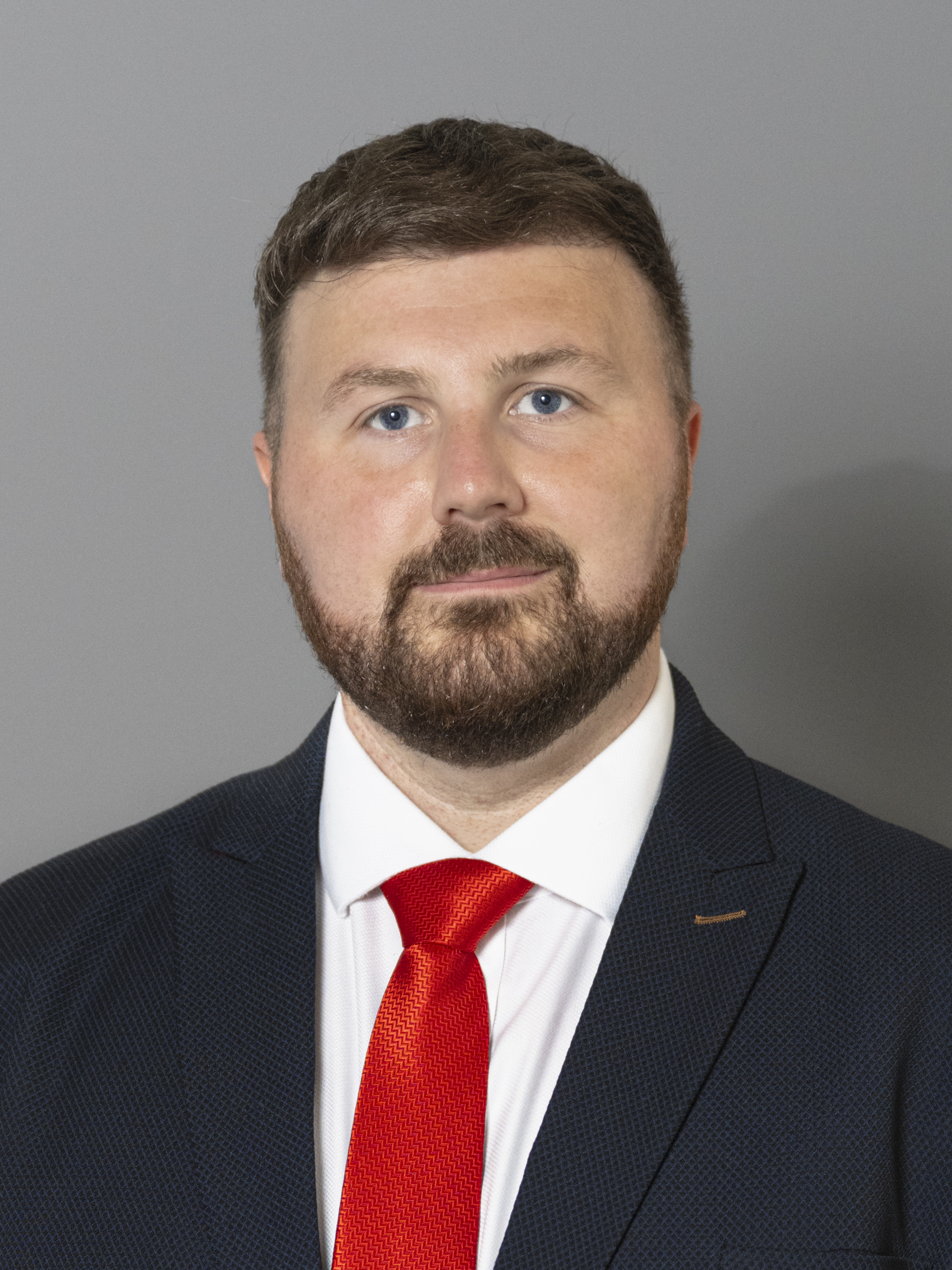
- Official portrait, 2024

Member of Parliament for Blackpool South
- Incumbent
- Assumed office 2 May 2024
- Preceded by: Scott Benton
- Majority: 6,868 (19.6%)

Deputy Police and Crime Commissioner for Lancashire
- In office December 2018 – May 2021
- Commissioner: Clive Grunshaw
- Preceded by: Ibrahim Master
- Succeeded by: Andy Pratt

Member of Manchester City Council for Northenden
- In office 7 May 2015 – 3 May 2018
- Preceded by: Richard Cowell
- Succeeded by: Sam Lynch

Personal details
- Born: Christopher Paul Webb; 26 April 1986 (age 40) Blackpool, Lancashire, England
- Party: Labour
- Spouse: Portia Webb (m. 2019)
- Children: 1
- Education: University of Hull
- Website: www.chriswebb.org

Christopher Paul Webb (born 26 April 1986) is a British Labour Party politician who has been Member of Parliament (MP) for Blackpool South since 2024.

== Early life and education ==
Christopher Webb was born on 26 April 1986 in Blackpool Victoria Hospital, and attended Layton Primary School and St Mary's High School. He is the son of a local postman and a teaching assistant.

He studied British politics and legislative studies at the University of Hull, and while at university was the president of Hull University Rugby League (HURL) Club and a member of the students' union council.

== Political career ==
Webb served as a Councillor on Manchester City Council from 2015 to 2018. During his time on the council, he was stranded in Belgium following the 2016 Brussels bombings, whilst on a delegation to the European Parliament.

At the snap 2017 general election, Webb stood as the Labour candidate in Blackpool North and Cleveleys, coming second with 44.5 per cent of the vote behind the incumbent Conservative MP Paul Maynard.

Webb was appointed Deputy Police and Crime Commissioner for Lancashire in 2018 and was the youngest DPCC in the country.

Webb stood again as Labour candidate in Blackpool North and Cleveleys at the 2019 general election, again coming second with 35.5 per cent of the vote behind Maynard.

In August 2023, Webb was selected as Labour's prospective parliamentary candidate for Blackpool South at the 2024 general election. Following the resignation of the incumbent Conservative MP Scott Benton, Webb became the Labour candidate in the 2024 Blackpool South by-election.

== Parliamentary career ==
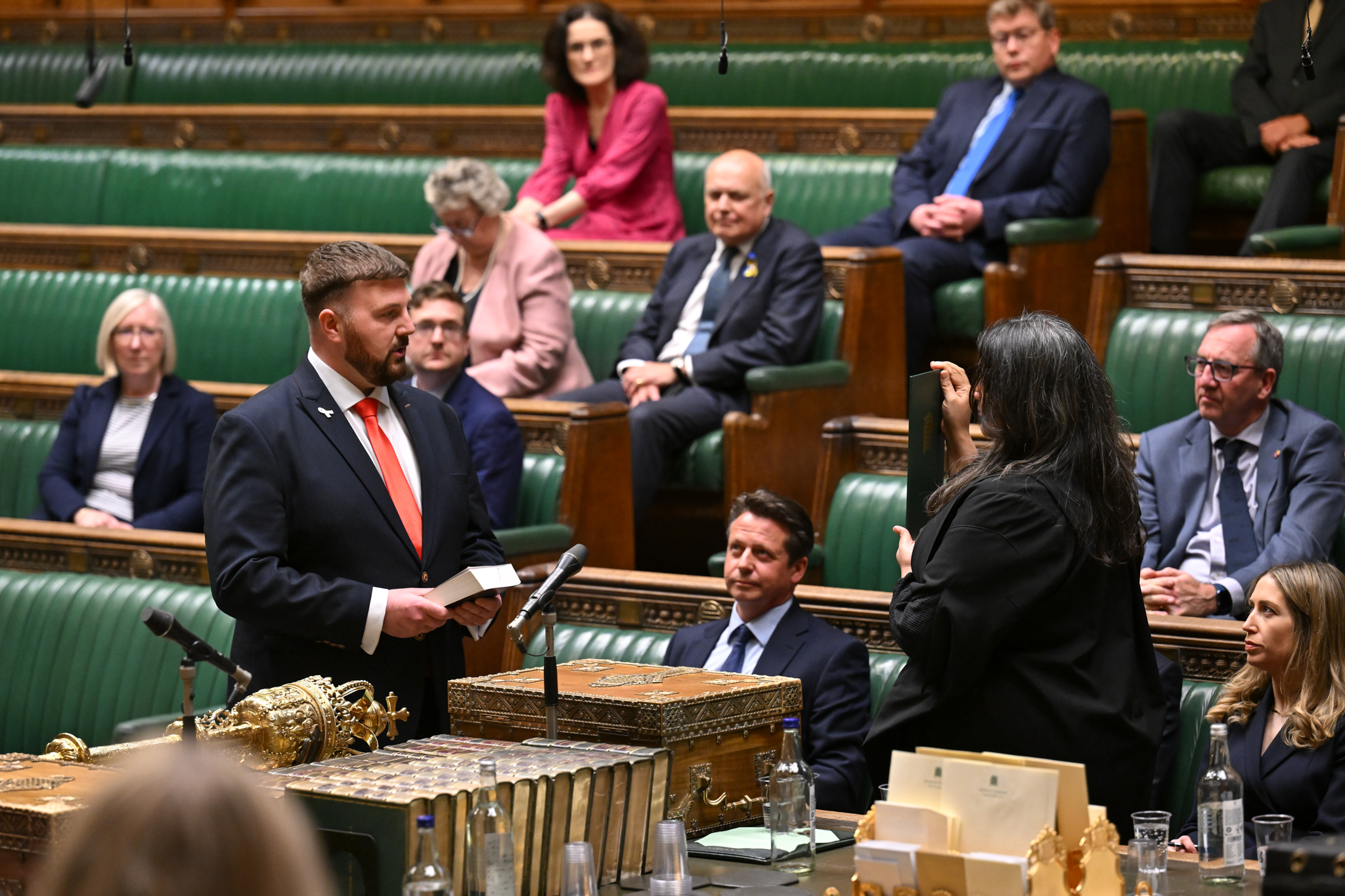
Webb being sworn in as an MP, 7 May 2024

At the Blackpool South by-election on 2 May, the same day as local elections across England, Webb was elected with 58.9 per cent of the vote and a majority of 7,607. Webb was the first Blackpool South MP to have been born in the constituency for 60 years. Labour leader Keir Starmer called the result “truly historic” with Webb winning the seat with the third biggest swing from the Conservatives to Labour in postwar history.

Webb was sworn into Parliament on 7 May 2024. On 22 May 2024 then Prime Minister Rishi Sunak called a general election to be held on 4 July. Webb was in office just 24 days during which he raised four Parliamentary questions and delivered his maiden speech on 24 May – the last day of Parliament before it was dissolved for the election campaign. In it he traced his family history back 500 years to an ancestor he claimed saved the life of Henry VIII and described himself as "a child of tourism" – his mother having moved to Blackpool to become a Butlins Redcoat.

At the 2024 general election, Webb was re-elected to Parliament as MP for Blackpool South with a vote share of 48.1% and a majority of 6,868.

=== Child poverty ===
Prior to his election Webb worked to alleviate child poverty in Blackpool which has one of the highest rates in the country – nearly 44% in 2022-23.

On 13th November 2024 Webb held an adjournment debate in the House of Commons on infant formula regulations as part of a campaign to make infant formula more affordable and accessible. In January 2025 the Department of Health and Social Care confirmed in a letter to Webb that food banks could provide formula to families and that families are able to use food bank and supermarket vouchers to purchase it.

In March 2025 he published a report on the Impact of the Cost of Living on Childhood in Blackpool South, based on the experiences of parents and those working with families in Blackpool. The report was presented to the Child Poverty Taskforce to inform its Child Poverty Strategy.

Webb had been critical of the Government’s approach to welfare reform ahead of the March 2025 Spring Statement. In the House of Commons he shared his concerns about the impact of the reforms on child poverty in his constituency. The government's impact assessment of the reforms showed they could push 50,000 more children in poverty.

In September 2025, Webb publicly called on the Government to abolish the two child benefit cap and rethink its approach to tackling child poverty.

=== Mental health ===
Webb was chair of Blackpool mental health charity Counselling in the Community from 2018 until his election.

Webb has advocated for more mental health support for Blackpool which, in 2022-23, had the highest prevalence of GP-diagnosed depression in England, with 21.6% of the population suffering. He has raised the issue several times in Parliament, calling on the government to empower local mental charities rather than relying on the private sector to clear the NHS backlog, and paying tribute to Blackpool man Jamie Pearson who committed suicide while waiting for mental health support in Blackpool Victoria Hospital's Emergency Department.

In January 2025 Webb was elected Vice Chair of the All-Party Parliamentary Group for Mental Health.

=== Crime ===
Webb was Deputy Police and Crime Commissioner for Lancashire. As MP he has advocated for more community police officers for Blackpool South. He used his first question in the House of Commons to talk about knife crime in his constituency after 2024 figures showed a 416% increase under the then Conservative government.

Webb is chair of the All-Party Parliamentary Group for Boxing and has advocated for investment in grassroots boxing gyms in tackling anti-social behaviour.

=== Tourism ===
In his maiden speech Webb called himself "a child of tourism". His first job was working on a stall on Blackpool Promenade.

He has repeatedly criticised United Utilities for sewage dumping in Blackpool sea as a threat to tourism, health, wellbeing and local pride.

In September 2024 Webb was elected chair of the All-Party Parliamentary Group for Tourism and Hospitality. The same month he hosted the Secretary for State for the Department of Culture, Media and Sport in Blackpool to discuss tourism.

In March 2025 Webb joined a group of 66 Labour MPs representing coastal communities with an aim to secure the investment and attention for them. On 20 March 2025 he spoke in a debate on coastal communities in the House of Commons calling for a 12.5% VAT reduction for hospitality and tourism businesses and a cross-government strategy dedicated to improving the health, wellbeing and prosperity of these areas.

== Charity work ==
Webb has been involved with several charitable organisations both as a fundraiser and volunteer. He has served as a constituency partner for Blackpool Food Bank since 2017, along with being chair of trustees for Counselling in the Community in Blackpool, and as a trustee for Communication Workers Union Humanitarian Aid (CWUHA).

In October 2020, he raised over £14,000 to provide emergency holiday food parcels for families in Blackpool, an effort publicly praised by footballer Marcus Rashford. He received a Local Hero Award in 2021 for his community work during the COVID-19 pandemic. In April 2022, he co-led a CWUHA convoy that transported over 20 tonnes of humanitarian aid to Ukrainian refugees in Poland. Additionally, Webb has participated in events such as the London Marathon, the Great North Run, and a white-collar boxing match to fundraise for organisations including CWUHA, the Royal British Legion, and Cancer Research UK.

== Personal life ==
Webb's wife, Portia Webb, was elected as a Labour councillor for the ward of Tyldesley at the 2023 Blackpool Council election. They married in 2019 and have a son.

Parliament of the United Kingdom
Preceded by Scott Benton	Member of Parliament for Blackpool South; 2024–present	Incumbent
