= 2024 Blackpool South by-election =

UK parliamentary by-election

- 2 May 2024

Blackpool South constituency
- Registered: 56,696
- Turnout: 32.5% (▼24.3 pp)
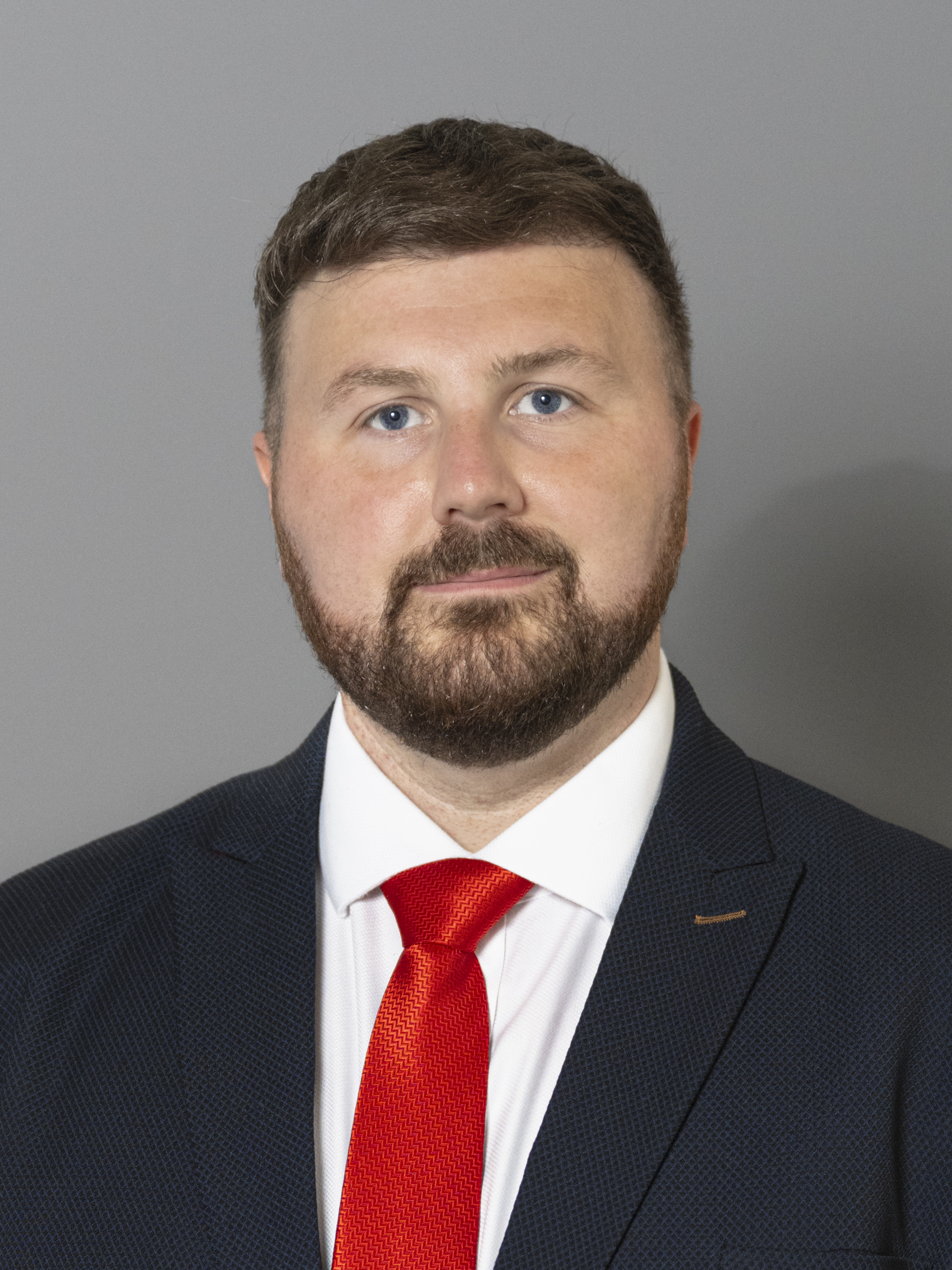
| | First party | Second party | Third party |
|---|---|---|---|
| | | Con | Ref |
| Candidate | Chris Webb | David Jones | Mark Butcher |
| Party | Labour | Conservative | Reform |
| Popular vote | 10,825 | 3,218 | 3,101 |
| Percentage | 58.9% | 17.5% | 16.9% |
| Swing | ▲20.6 pp | ▼32.1 pp | ▲10.9 pp |
MP before election
Scott Benton
Independent (Note: Although elected as a Conservative in 2019, Benton was sitting as an independent MP at the time of his resignation.)
Elected MP
Chris Webb
Labour

A by-election for the United Kingdom parliamentary constituency of Blackpool South was held on 2 May 2024, the same day as local elections in England and Wales. It was triggered by the resignation of incumbent Conservative MP Scott Benton following his suspension from the House of Commons. The by-election was won by Chris Webb of the Labour Party with a 26% swing.

Benton was suspended from the House of Commons on 27 February 2024 after being caught in a newspaper sting operation offering lobbying services for payment. This triggered a recall petition, which had started, but was then terminated by Benton's resignation on 25 March.

This was the last by-election of the 2019–2024 Parliament; the 2024 general election was held two months later on 4 July.

== Background ==
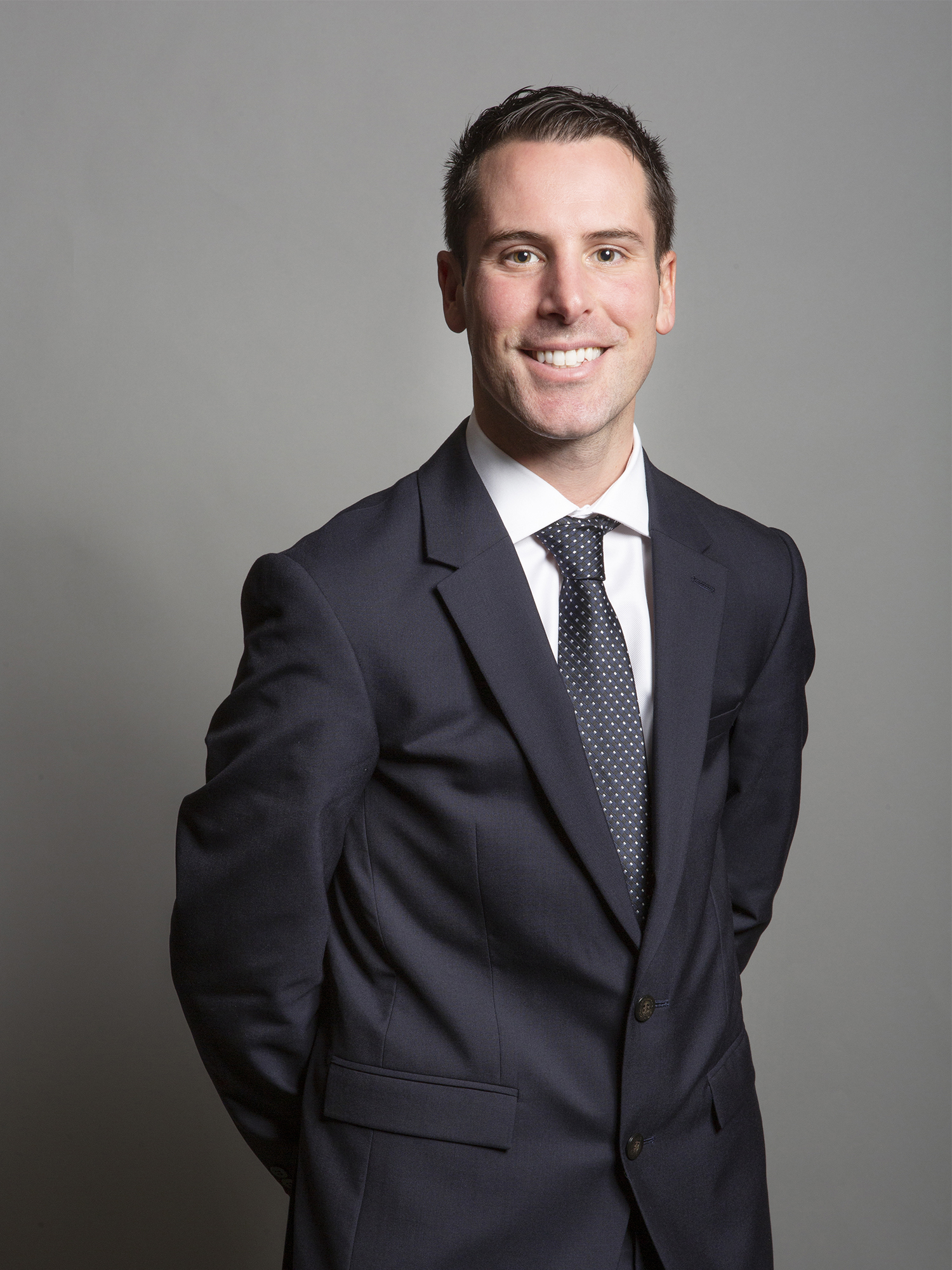
Scott Benton, the previous MP.

=== Constituency ===
Blackpool South had been a Labour-held seat since 1997. Before that election, Conservative Party MPs had won in and represented the constituency since it was first contested in 1945. In the 2019 general election it was won by Conservative candidate Scott Benton, who defeated the incumbent Labour MP Gordon Marsden. Some reporters and pollsters describe the constituency as one of the seats that make up the "red wall" and "sea wall". It is one of the most deprived constituencies in England, with high levels of unemployment and crime. All 14 of Lancashire's districts voted for Brexit in the 2016 European Union membership referendum, with the borough of Blackpool registering a particularly strong leave vote of 67.5%.

=== Corruption allegations ===
In April 2023 The Times published an article resulting from a sting operation alleging that Benton was willing to table parliamentary questions, leak documents and lobby ministers on behalf of gambling companies in return for "thousands of pounds per month". He also told the reporters that other MPs would be similarly willing to accept such payments. Benton was subsequently suspended from the Conservative Party, sitting thereafter as an independent MP.

In December 2023 the House of Commons' Standards Committee found that he had breached the House's rules and recommended a 35-day suspension from the House. This finding was appealed to the Independent Expert Panel, but the panel "found no substance" in Benton's arguments and dismissed the appeal. On 27 February 2024 the Commons approved a motion suspending Benton from the House for 35 days.

=== Recall petition and resignation ===
As the length of Benton's suspension exceeded the ten-day threshold designated in the Recall of MPs Act 2015, a recall procedure was triggered.

The signing period began on Tuesday 12 March and was set to run until Monday 22 April 2024. The number of signatures required for the petition to be successful, 10% of the constituency's electorate, was 5,634. The Labour party officially registered as campaigning for the petition's success.

Benton resigned as an MP on 25 March 2024, terminating the recall petition thirteen days into the signing period.

== Campaign ==
The writ of election was moved on 26 March 2024. The by-election was held on 2 May 2024, concurrently with local elections and police and crime commissioner elections.

Issues in the by-election included "levelling-up", social deprivation, overstretched NHS, homelessness, low investment, crime, anti-social behaviour, and child poverty.

On 19 April 2024, a hustings was held between the candidates at Blackpool Cricket Club.

=== Candidates ===
Labour selected Chris Webb to stand for the constituency in August 2023. Webb is a former assistant to Gordon Marsden, who represented Blackpool South as MP from 1997 until 2019.

The Conservative candidate was David Jones. His background is in the construction industry and charitable fundraising.

Ben Thomas stood for the Green Party. He is secretary of the Blackpool and Fylde Green Party. The Greens have called for the new football regulator to be based in Blackpool.

The Liberal Democrats selected Andrew Cregan as their candidate. Cregan was previously a Labour councillor in Tower Hamlets, but defected to the Liberal Democrats in 2017 over Brexit.

Reform UK selected Mark Butcher to stand as their candidate. He is a former street preacher and local charity worker. During the campaign the Charity Commission confirmed it had not opened a "statutory case" into his soup kitchen amid allegations of misuse of funds but has raised a "compliance case" into issues regarding political bias with the Trustees of the charity.

The Alliance for Democracy and Freedom selected Kim Knight. Damon Sharp stood for the label New Open Non-Political Organised Leadership. Stephen Black was an independent candidate. Perennial candidate Howling Laud Hope stood for the Official Monster Raving Loony Party.

== Result ==
2024 Blackpool South by-election
| Party | Candidate | Votes | % | ±% |
|---|---|---|---|---|
| Labour | Chris Webb | 10,825 | 58.9 | +20.6 |
| Conservative | David Jones | 3,218 | 17.5 | –32.1 |
| Reform | Mark Butcher | 3,101 | 16.9 | +10.8 |
| Liberal Democrats | Andrew Cregan | 387 | 2.1 | –1.0 |
| Green | Ben Thomas | 368 | 2.0 | +0.3 |
| Independent | Stephen Black | 163 | 0.9 | N/A |
| Alliance for Democracy and Freedom | Kim Knight | 147 | 0.8 | N/A |
| Monster Raving Loony | Howling Laud Hope | 121 | 0.7 | N/A |
| New Open Non-Political Organised Leadership | Damon Sharp | 45 | 0.2 | N/A |
| Majority | | 7,607 | 41.4 | N/A |
| Rejected ballots | | 73 | 0.4 | |
| Turnout | | 18,375 | 32.5 | –24.3 |
| Registered electors | | 56,696 | | |
| Labour gain from Conservative | | Swing | +26.3 | |

The result was considered a strong performance by Labour and a weak one for the Conservatives, with the swing being the third-largest Conservative-to-Labour swing since 1945. Psephologist John Curtice likened this and other recent results to elections in the years before Labour's landslide win in 1997.

Reform UK came a close third behind the Conservative Party, giving it the largest share of the vote in a by-election since its change of name from the Brexit Party.

== Previous result ==
General election 2019: Blackpool South
| Party | Candidate | Votes | % | ±% |
|---|---|---|---|---|
| Conservative | Scott Benton | 16,247 | 49.6 | +6.5 |
| Labour | Gordon Marsden | 12,557 | 38.3 | –12.0 |
| Brexit Party | David Brown | 2,009 | 6.1 | N/A |
| Liberal Democrats | Bill Greene | 1,008 | 3.1 | +1.3 |
| Green | Becky Daniels | 563 | 1.7 | +0.7 |
| Independent | Gary Coleman | 368 | 1.1 | N/A |
| Majority | | 3,690 | 11.3 | N/A |
| Turnout | | 32,752 | 56.8 | –3.0 |
| Conservative gain from Labour | | Swing | +9.3 | |
