= Blackpool South (constituency) =

Parliamentary constituency in the United Kingdom, 1945 onwards

Coordinates: 53.767°N 2.914°W

- Borough constituency for the House of Commons
- Interactive map of boundaries since 2024
- Location within North West England
- County: Lancashire
- Population: 81,266 (2011 census)
- Electorate: 76,071 March (2020)
- Major settlements: Blackpool (part)

Current constituency
- Created: 1945
- Member of Parliament: Chris Webb (Labour)
- Seats: One
- Created from: Blackpool

Blackpool South is a constituency (Note: A borough constituency (for the purposes of election expenses and type of returning officer)) in Lancashire, England, which has been represented by Chris Webb of the Labour Party since a 2024 by-election.

== Constituency profile ==
The seat encompasses the central and southern parts of Blackpool, including the famous Blackpool Tower, the three piers and the Pleasure Beach. Also included is the Bloomfield area, home to Blackpool F.C. In the southern end of the seat, near to the Fylde border, Squires Gate is the site of Blackpool Airport.

Tourism is a major industry in the area, and while Blackpool has been less affected by the decline in domestic holidaymaking than some resorts, there are nonetheless some run-down areas which were once rather more glamorous. Traditionally seaside seats were very safe for the Conservative Party, but for some time it seemed unlikely that the party would win it back. However, they were able to do so in 2019 when they finally achieved a sizeable majority with many gains in northern England. The seat was then lost again in the 2024 by-election.

== History ==
This seat was created for the 1945 general election. This marginal constituency has been represented by both the Conservative and Labour Party parties since the Second World War. It was held by the Conservatives until 1997, when Gordon Marsden gained it for Labour. He represented the seat for the next 22 years but was defeated in 2019 by the Conservative Scott Benton. Benton resigned from Parliament on 25 March 2024, and the by-election to replace him was won by Labour's Chris Webb.

== Boundaries ==
=== Historic ===
1945–1950: The County Borough of Blackpool wards of Marton, Stanley, Victoria, and Waterloo, and the Borough of Lytham St Annes.

1950–1983: The County Borough of Blackpool wards of Alexandra, Marton, Stanley, Tyldesley, Victoria, and Waterloo.

1983–1997: The Borough of Blackpool wards of Alexandra, Clifton, Foxhall, Hawes Side, Highfield, Marton, Squires Gate, Stanley, Tyldesley, Victoria, and Waterloo.

1997–2010: The Borough of Blackpool wards of Alexandra, Brunswick, Clifton, Foxhall, Hawes Side, Highfield, Layton, Marton, Park, Squires Gate, Stanley, Talbot, Tyldesley, Victoria, and Waterloo.

2010–2024: The Borough of Blackpool wards of Bloomfield, Brunswick, Clifton, Hawes Side, Highfield, Marton, Squires Gate, Stanley, Talbot, Tyldesley, Victoria, and Waterloo.

=== Current ===
Further to the 2023 review of Westminster constituencies, which came into effect for the 2024 general election, the constituency is composed of the following wards of the Borough of Blackpool (as they existed on 1 December 2020):

- Bloomfield; Brunswick; Claremont; Clifton; Hawes Side; Highfield; Layton; Marton; Park; Squires Gate; Stanley; Talbot; Tyldesley; Victoria; Warbreck; Waterloo.

The constituency was expanded to bring the electorate within the permitted range by transferring the wards of Claremount, Layton, Park and Warbreck from the abolished constituency of Blackpool North and Cleveleys.

== Members of Parliament ==
Election	Member	Party
1945	Roland Robinson	Conservative
1964	Sir Peter Blaker	Conservative
1992	Nick Hawkins	Conservative
1997	Gordon Marsden	Labour
2019	Scott Benton	Conservative
2023	Scott Benton	Independent
2024 by-election	Chris Webb	Labour

== Elections ==
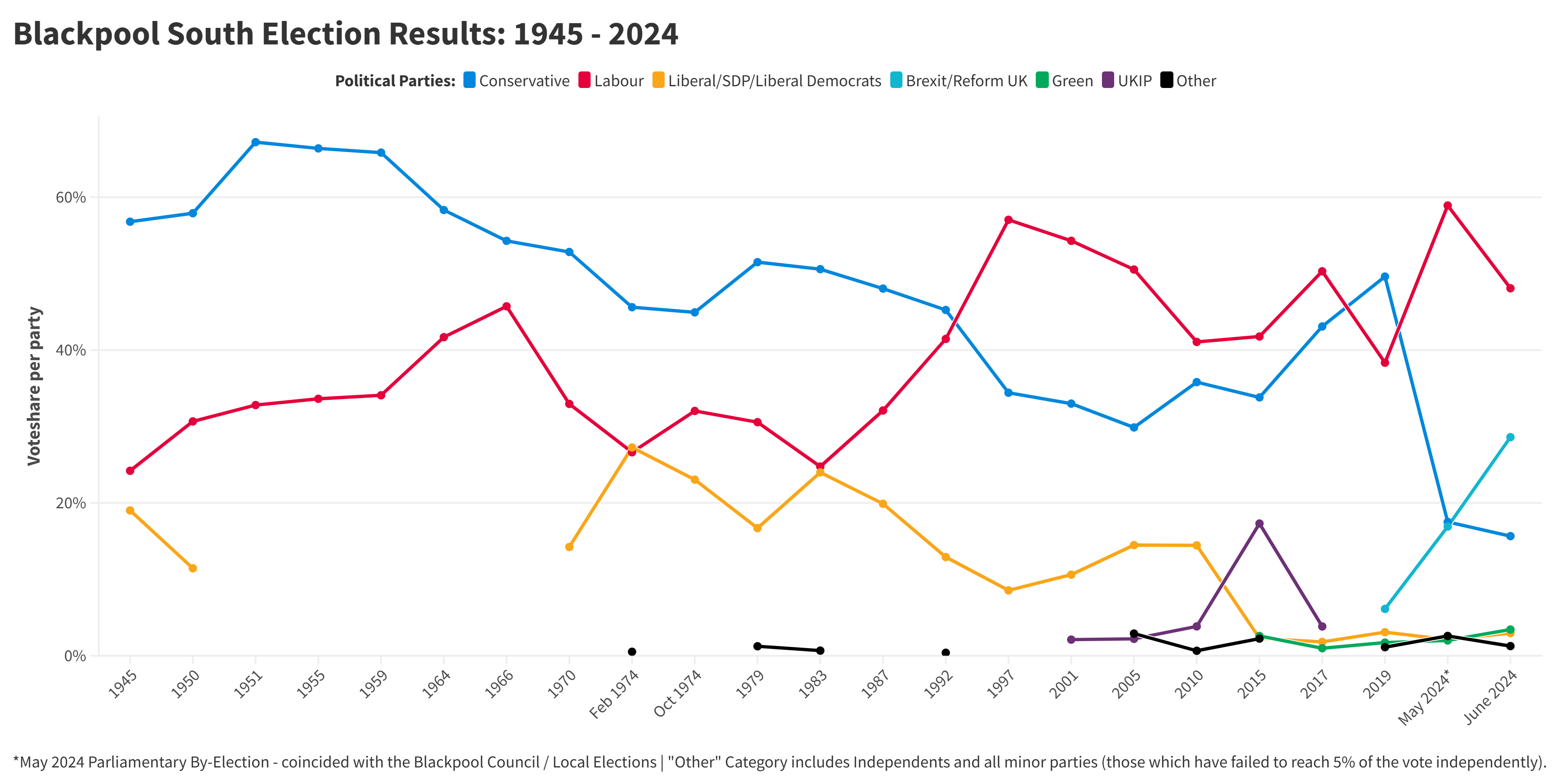
Blackpool South Election Results 1945–2024

=== Elections in the 2020s ===
General election 2024: Blackpool South
Party	Candidate	Votes	%	±%
Labour	Chris Webb	16,916	48.1	+8.0
Reform	Mark Butcher	10,068	28.6	+23.9
Conservative	Zak Khan	5,504	15.6	−33.2
Green	Ben Thomas	1,207	3.4	+1.5
Liberal Democrats	Andy Cregan	1,041	3.0	−0.5
Independent	Stephen Black	261	0.7	N/A
Alliance for Democracy and Freedom	Kim Knight	183	0.5	N/A
Majority		6,868	19.5	N/A
Turnout		35,180	45.4	−11.4
Labour gain from Conservative		Swing		

Vote share changes for the 2024 election are compared to the notional results from the 2019 election, not the 2024 by-election.

2024 Blackpool South by-election
Party	Candidate	Votes	%	±%
Labour	Chris Webb	10,825	58.9	+20.6
Conservative	David Jones	3,218	17.5	−32.1
Reform	Mark Butcher	3,101	16.9	+10.8
Liberal Democrats	Andrew Cregan	387	2.1	−1.0
Green	Ben Thomas	368	2.0	+0.3
Independent	Stephen Black	163	0.9	N/A
Alliance for Democracy and Freedom	Kim Knight	147	0.8	N/A
Monster Raving Loony	Howling Laud Hope	121	0.7	N/A
New Open Non-Political Organised Leadership	Damon Sharp	45	0.2	N/A
Majority		7,607	41.4	N/A
Turnout		18,375	32.5	−24.3
Labour gain from Conservative		Swing	+26.3	

=== Elections in the 2010s ===
General election 2019: Blackpool South
Party	Candidate	Votes	%	±%
Conservative	Scott Benton	16,247	49.6	+6.5
Labour	Gordon Marsden	12,557	38.3	−12.0
Brexit Party	David Brown	2,009	6.1	N/A
Liberal Democrats	Bill Greene	1,008	3.1	+1.3
Green	Becky Daniels	563	1.7	+0.7
Independent	Gary Coleman	368	1.1	N/A
Majority		3,690	11.3	N/A
Turnout		32,752	56.8	−3.0
Conservative gain from Labour		Swing	+9.3	

General election 2017: Blackpool South
Party	Candidate	Votes	%	±%
Labour	Gordon Marsden	17,581	50.3	+8.5
Conservative	Peter Anthony	15,058	43.1	+9.3
UKIP	Noel Matthews	1,339	3.8	−13.5
Liberal Democrats	Bill Greene	634	1.8	−0.5
Green	John Warnock	341	1.0	−1.6
Majority		2,523	7.2	−0.8
Turnout		34,953	59.8	+3.3
Labour hold		Swing	−0.4	

General election 2015: Blackpool South
Party	Candidate	Votes	%	±%
Labour	Gordon Marsden	13,548	41.8	+0.7
Conservative	Peter Anthony	10,963	33.8	−2.0
UKIP	Peter Wood	5,613	17.3	+13.5
Green	Duncan Royle	841	2.6	N/A
Liberal Democrats	Bill Greene	743	2.3	−12.1
Independent	Andy Higgins	655	2.0	N/A
Independent	Lawrence Chard	73	0.2	N/A
Majority		2,585	8.0	+2.7
Turnout		32,436	56.5	+0.7
Labour hold		Swing	+1.3	

General election 2010: Blackpool South
Party	Candidate	Votes	%	±%
Labour	Gordon Marsden	14,449	41.1	−7.5
Conservative	Ron Bell	12,597	35.8	+4.9
Liberal Democrats	Doreen Holt	5,082	14.4	−0.7
BNP	Roy Goodwin	1,482	4.2	+0.9
UKIP	Hugh Howitt	1,352	3.8	+1.7
Integrity UK	Si Thu Tun	230	0.7	N/A
Majority		1,852	5.3	−15.4
Turnout		35,192	55.8	+3.5
Labour hold		Swing	−6.2	

=== Elections in the 2000s ===
General election 2005: Blackpool South
Party	Candidate	Votes	%	±%
Labour	Gordon Marsden	19,375	50.5	−3.8
Conservative	Michael Winstanley	11,453	29.9	−3.1
Liberal Democrats	Doreen Holt	5,552	14.5	+3.9
BNP	Roy Goodwin	1,113	2.9	New
UKIP	John Porter	849	2.2	+0.1
Majority		7,922	20.6	−0.7
Turnout		38,342	52.1	−0.1
Labour hold		Swing	−0.3	

General election 2001: Blackpool South
Party	Candidate	Votes	%	±%
Labour	Gordon Marsden	21,060	54.3	−2.7
Conservative	David Morris	12,798	33.0	−1.4
Liberal Democrats	Doreen Holt	4,115	10.6	+2.0
UKIP	Valerie Cowell	819	2.1	New
Majority		8,262	21.3	−1.3
Turnout		38,792	52.2	−15.6
Labour hold		Swing	−0.7	

=== Elections in the 1990s ===
General election 1997: Blackpool South
Party	Candidate	Votes	%	±%
Labour	Gordon Marsden	29,282	57.0	+12.9
Conservative	Richard Booth	17,666	34.4	−9.0
Liberal Democrats	Doreen Holt	4,392	8.6	−3.5
Majority		11,616	22.6	N/A
Turnout		51,340	67.8	−6.5
Labour gain from Conservative		Swing	−11.0	

General election 1992: Blackpool South
Party	Candidate	Votes	%	±%
Conservative	Nick Hawkins	19,880	45.2	−2.8
Labour	Gordon Marsden	18,213	41.5	+9.4
Liberal Democrats	Robert E. Wynne	5,673	12.9	−7.0
Natural Law	Doug Henning	173	0.4	New
Majority		1,667	3.7	−12.2
Turnout		43,939	77.3	+3.8
Conservative hold		Swing	−6.1	

=== Elections in the 1980s ===
General election 1987: Blackpool South
Party	Candidate	Votes	%	±%
Conservative	Peter Blaker	20,312	48.0	−2.6
Labour	Sheilagh Baugh	13,568	32.1	+7.4
SDP	Julian Allitt	8,405	19.9	−4.1
Majority		6,744	15.9	−10.0
Turnout		42,285	73.5	+3.7
Conservative hold		Swing	−5.0	

General election 1983: Blackpool South
Party	Candidate	Votes	%	±%
Conservative	Peter Blaker	19,852	50.6	−0.9
Labour	Fred J. Jackson	9,714	24.7	−5.9
SDP	Alex G. Cox	9,417	24.0	New
National Front	Wilf Smith	263	0.7	−0.5
Majority		10,138	25.9	+5.0
Turnout		39,246	69.8	−2.3
Conservative hold		Swing		

=== Elections in the 1970s ===
General election 1979: Blackpool South
Party	Candidate	Votes	%	±%
Conservative	Peter Blaker	21,762	51.5	+6.6
Labour	Pat Carrington	12,914	30.6	−1.4
Liberal	Edmund E. Wynne	7,057	16.7	−6.4
National Front	Alan Machin	524	1.2	New
Majority		8,848	20.9	+8.0
Turnout		42,257	72.1	+2.2
Conservative hold		Swing	+4.0	

General election October 1974: Blackpool South
Party	Candidate	Votes	%	±%
Conservative	Peter Blaker	18,188	44.9	−0.7
Labour	Michael Atkins	12,967	32.0	+5.4
Liberal	Edmund E. Wynne	9,327	23.1	−4.2
Majority		5,221	12.9	−5.4
Turnout		40,482	69.9	−6.7
Conservative hold		Swing	−3.0	

General election February 1974: Blackpool South
Party	Candidate	Votes	%	±%
Conservative	Peter Blaker	20,107	45.6	−7.2
Liberal	Edmund E. Wynne	12,016	27.3	+13.1
Labour	Michael Atkins	11,739	26.6	−6.4
National Independence	Eric Mills	229	0.5	New
Majority		8,091	18.3	−1.5
Turnout		44,091	76.6	+8.3
Conservative hold		Swing		

General election 1970: Blackpool South
Party	Candidate	Votes	%	±%
Conservative	Peter Blaker	21,273	52.8	−1.5
Labour	Percy P Hall	13,267	33.0	−12.7
Liberal	David Chadwick	5,730	14.2	New
Majority		8,006	19.8	+11.2
Turnout		40,270	68.3	−1.8
Conservative hold		Swing		

=== Elections in the 1960s ===
General election 1966: Blackpool South
Party	Candidate	Votes	%	±%
Conservative	Peter Blaker	21,564	54.3	−4.0
Labour	Edward Pearce	18,166	45.7	+4.0
Majority		3,398	8.6	−8.0
Turnout		39,730	70.5	−0.6
Conservative hold		Swing	−4.0	

General election 1964: Blackpool South
Party	Candidate	Votes	%	±%
Conservative	Peter Blaker	23,769	58.3	−7.5
Labour	Percy P Hall	16,986	41.7	+7.5
Majority		6,783	16.6	−15.0
Turnout		40,755	71.1	−2.8
Conservative hold		Swing	−7.6	

=== Elections in the 1950s ===
General election 1959: Blackpool South
Party	Candidate	Votes	%	±%
Conservative	Roland Robinson	25,767	65.8	−0.6
Labour	Percy P Hall	13,337	34.2	+0.6
Majority		12,430	31.6	−1.2
Turnout		39,140	73.9	+7.2
Conservative hold		Swing	−0.6	

General election 1955: Blackpool South
Party	Candidate	Votes	%	±%
Conservative	Roland Robinson	24,773	66.4	−0.8
Labour	Arthur Davidson	12,548	33.6	+0.8
Majority		12,225	32.8	−1.6
Turnout		37,321	67.7	−7.3
Conservative hold		Swing	−0.8	

General election 1951: Blackpool South
Party	Candidate	Votes	%	±%
Conservative	Roland Robinson	28,171	67.2	+9.3
Labour	Kenneth Lomas	13,750	32.8	+2.1
Majority		14,421	34.4	+7.2
Turnout		41,921	75.0	−7.1
Conservative hold		Swing	+3.6	

General election 1950: Blackpool South
Party	Candidate	Votes	%	±%
Conservative	Roland Robinson	26,800	57.9	+1.1
Labour	Ernest Alfred Machin	14,190	30.7	+6.5
Liberal	Michael Henry Woodward	5,295	11.4	−7.6
Majority		12,610	27.2	−5.4
Turnout		46,285	82.1	−9.8
Conservative hold		Swing		

=== Elections in the 1940s ===
General election 1945: Blackpool South
Party	Candidate	Votes	%	±%
Conservative	Roland Robinson	27,957	56.8	
Labour	Charles Stanley Hilditch	11,914	24.2	
Liberal	Adrian Liddell Hart	9,359	19.0	
Majority		16,043	32.6	
Turnout		49,230	72.3	
Conservative win (new seat)				

== See also ==
- List of parliamentary constituencies in Lancashire
