= Peter Blaker =

British politician (1922–2009)

The Right Honourable The Lord Blaker KCMG PC

Member of Parliament for Blackpool South
- In office 15 October 1964 – 16 March 1992
- Preceded by: Roland Robinson
- Succeeded by: Nick Hawkins

Member of the House of Lords
- Lord Temporal
- Life peerage 10 October 1994 – 5 July 2009

Personal details
- Born: Peter Allan Renshaw Blaker; 4 October 1922 British Hong Kong
- Died: 5 July 2009 (aged 86) South Kensington, London, England
- Party: Conservative
- Spouse: Jennifer Dixon (m. 1953)
- Children: 3
- Parent: Cedric Blaker (father)
- Education: New College, Oxford

Peter Allan Renshaw Blaker, Baron Blaker, KCMG, PC (4 October 1922 – 5 July 2009) was a British Conservative politician.

== Early life ==
Blaker was born in Hong Kong, son of Cedric Blaker. He was educated at Shrewsbury School before being evacuated to Canada in 1939. There he took a degree in classics, before being commissioned in the Canadian Army. On return to England he went to New College, Oxford. He qualified as a lawyer, and later joined the Foreign Office.

== Political career ==
In 1964 he was elected Member of Parliament for Blackpool South, which he represented until 1992. In Parliament, he served as a Minister for the Army (1972–1974), Foreign and Commonwealth Affairs (1974 and 1979–1981). He was a Minister of State in the Ministry of Defence from 29 May 1981, until 9 June 1983. He was sworn of the Privy Council in the 1983 Birthday Honours, and was appointed a Knight Commander of the Order of St Michael and St George (KCMG) on 21 July 1983.

== House of Lords ==
On 10 October 1994 he was created a life peer as Baron Blaker, of Blackpool in the County of Lancaster and of Lindfield in the County of West Sussex.

== Coat of arms ==
Coat of arms of Peter Blaker
Coronet A Coronet of a Baron Crest A horse's head Sable maned Or bridled Argent reined Ermine. Escutcheon Per pale Argent and Or on a chevron Sable between three martlets volant Azure each holding in the beak a rose slipped Gules seeded Or two blackamoor heads couped Argent the ears ringed Or between three Ermine spots Argent. Supporters Dexter a wildcat guardant Or sinister a Chinese dragon also Or. Motto Esto Quod Esse Videris (Be What You Seem To Be) Orders Order of St Michael & St George circlet (Appointed KCMG 1983)

== Personal life and death ==
In 1953, Blaker married Jennifer Dixon, daughter of diplomat Pierson Dixon. They had one son and two daughters.

Blaker died from pneumonia at Cromwell Hospital in South Kensington, London, on 5 July 2009, aged 86.

== Footnotes ==
Parliament of the United Kingdom
Preceded by Roland Robinson	Member of Parliament for Blackpool South; 1964–1992	Succeeded by Nick Hawkins
