= Scott Benton (politician) =

British politician (born 1987)

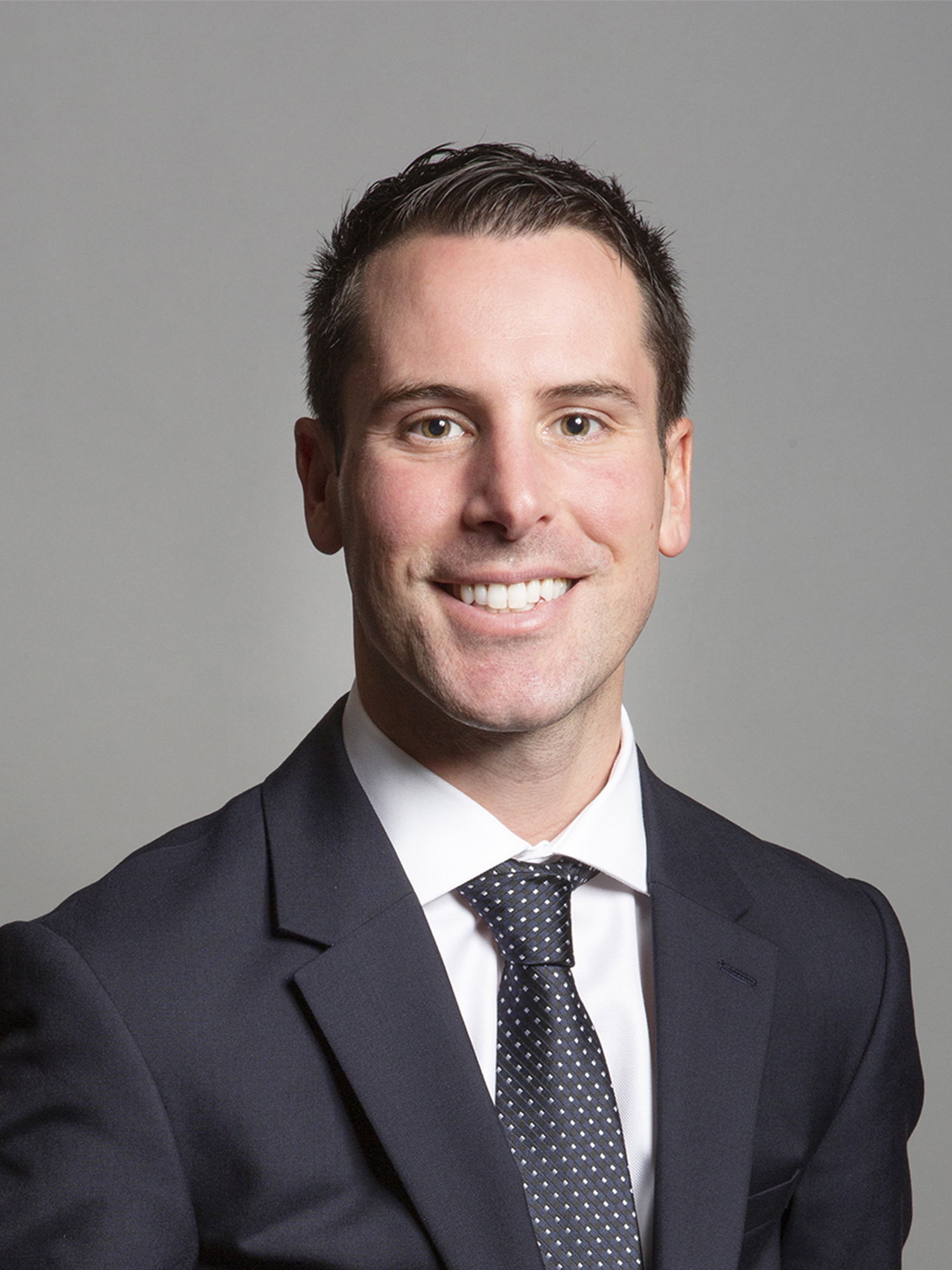
- Official portrait, 2019

Member of Parliament for Blackpool South
- In office 12 December 2019 – 25 March 2024
- Preceded by: Gordon Marsden
- Succeeded by: Chris Webb

Personal details
- Born: Scott Lloyd Benton; 1 July 1987 (age 39) Newport, Wales
- Party: Restore Britain (since 2026)
- Other political affiliations: Conservative (until 2026)
- Spouse: Harry Symonds (m. 2021)
- Education: University of Nottingham

Scott Lloyd Benton (born 1 July 1987) is a former British politician who was Member of Parliament (MP) for Blackpool South from the 2019 general election until his resignation in March 2024. A member of the Conservative Party, he was previously also a councillor on Calderdale Metropolitan Borough Council and a primary school teacher.

In April 2023 Benton had the whip removed after he had suggested to reporters, posing as investors, that he would lobby ministers in return for payments. A parliamentary investigation concluded that he had breached lobbying rules and recommended a 35-day suspension from the House of Commons, triggering a recall petition. Benton's subsequent resignation as an MP prompted a by-election on 2 May 2024.

== Early life and education ==
Benton was born on 1 July 1987 in Newport, Wales, to Alan and Krystina Benton. He grew up in Rastrick, West Yorkshire, and attended Rastrick High School. Benton then studied Theology as an undergraduate at the University of Nottingham and was awarded a first class Bachelor of Arts degree. He later completed a Master of Arts degree in the subject, specialising in the Old Testament. After graduating, Benton worked as a primary school teacher.

== Political career ==
In 2011 Benton was elected to Calderdale Metropolitan Borough Council for the Brighouse ward. He was deputy leader of the Council and then leader of the Conservative group. From 2013 to 2019 Benton worked as a Parliamentary assistant for Craig Whittaker, the Conservative MP for Calder Valley.

In 2015 Benton unsuccessfully proposed a motion that all schools in his council district should sing the national anthem daily and be encouraged to fly the Union Jack.

At the 2017 Northern Ireland Assembly election, Benton stood as the Northern Ireland Conservatives candidate for the Strangford constituency. He finished last, winning 0.5% of the vote. At the 2017 general election, Benton stood for election in Huddersfield, where he won 33.0% of the vote and finished second behind the incumbent veteran Labour MP Barry Sheerman.

Benton stood for and was elected as the MP for Blackpool South at the 2019 general election, where he won 49.6% of the vote and a majority of 3,690 (11.3%). His campaign focused on delivering Brexit and reopening Blackpool Airport for commercial flights.

During the election campaign, David Brown, who stood for the Brexit Party against Benton, expressed concerns over his links to the anti-abortion organisation Society for the Protection of Unborn Children (SPUC), which has campaigned against same-sex marriage and has been accused of homophobia. In response, Benton stated that he was no longer linked to SPUC. He said that he supported their anti-abortion stance but was not homophobic and was a supporter of same-sex marriage.

In November 2020, following complaints to Calderdale Council and the Parliamentary Standards Commission, Benton expressed his intention to give up his council seat as soon as Covid regulations allowed elections to be held, having previously been cancelled in 2020 due to the pandemic. Benton's mother Tina Benton was elected in May 2021 to replace him as councillor for the Brighouse ward.

In December 2021 Benton expressed support for the death penalty in certain scenarios.

On 13 June 2022 Benton was appointed as a Parliamentary Private Secretary in the Foreign, Commonwealth and Development Office ministerial team.

Benton is anti-abortion. In June 2022, following the Dobbs v. Jackson Women's Health Organization decision of the US Supreme Court – which reversed the 1973 Roe v. Wade decision which had previously granted the right to abortion in the United States — Benton retweeted a tweet by the US Republican Party celebrating the decision. Benton subsequently deleted the retweet.

=== Breaches of parliamentary rules ===
In January 2021, Benton was found to have broken Parliamentary rules for failing to declare payments he had received for his previous work as a parliamentary researcher for Calder Valley MP Craig Whittaker and as a councillor for Brighouse ward on Calderdale Council within 28 days. When asked about the allegations in November 2020, he cited "an admin error" for failing to declare his income as a councillor. In response to the Parliamentary Commissioner for Standards' findings, Benton apologised for "inadvertently breaching the rules".

In July 2021, Benton was one of nine MPs from different political parties who had accepted tickets to high-profile sporting events as hospitality from betting and gambling companies. He had received tickets to Royal Ascot, two Euro 2020 football games and Wimbledon.

In April 2023, The Times newspaper filmed Benton appearing to offer to leak confidential information and lobby ministers in return for payments, from a group of undercover journalists posing as gambling industry investors. In response, he referred himself to the Parliamentary Commissioner for Standards who opened an investigation in the same month. Benton also had his whip suspended pending the results of the investigation. At the time he was also the chairman of the All-party parliamentary group on betting and gaming.

The Office of the Registrar of Consultant Lobbyists, a body set up in 2014 to monitor political lobbying, ruled that Benton had not conducted "unregistered consultant lobbying activity" on behalf of the gambling industry based on "assurances" that they had received.

In December 2023, a report by the Commons Standards Committee stated that "The meeting the undercover reporters was not in any sense of Mr Benton’s seeking, and there is no evidence that he has ever sought opportunities to make improper financial gains from his position as a Member."

The report concluded, however, that his interactions with The Times were a "very serious breach" of lobbying rules and that he had given the message that "he was corrupt and 'for sale' and that so were many other Members of the House". The committee recommended that he be suspended from Parliament for 35 days. In February 2024, Benton lost his appeal against the proposed suspension. MPs later voted to approve his suspension of 35 days from the House of Commons, triggering a recall petition which, if successful, would have led to a by-election. On 25 March 2024, however, Benton tendered his resignation and ceased to be an MP when he was appointed as Crown Steward and Bailiff of the Manor of Northstead.

He joined Restore Britain in 2026, acting as campaign manager for the party in the 2026 Makerfield by-election, having previously been rejected by Reform UK. His membership angered large parts of Restore's supporters.

== Personal life ==
Benton is gay and came out to his parents shortly before his wedding. He married personal trainer Harry Symonds in November 2021 in the Palace of Westminster. In 2026, Symonds appeared as a contestant on the twenty-third series of Big Brother, ultimately finishing in eleventh place after being evicted on Day 41.

Benton is Christian and cited the Old Testament as his favourite book in a 2022 GB News interview with Gloria De Piero.

Parliament of the United Kingdom
Preceded by Gordon Marsden	Member of Parliament for Blackpool South; 2019–2024	Succeeded by Chris Webb
