= 1999 Lancaster City Council election =

Local election in Lancaster, England

- 6 May 1999

All 60 seats to Lancaster City Council 31 seats needed for a majority

	First party	Second party	Third party
Party	Labour	Conservative	MB Independent
Last election	35 seats	11 seats	0 seats
Seats before	35	11	0
Seats won	17	8	22
Seat change	▼18	▼3	▲22
	Fourth party	Fifth party	Sixth party
Party	Green	Liberal Democrats	Independent
Last election	0 seats	5 seats	9 seats
Seats before	0	5	9
Seats won	5	6	3
Seat change	▲5	▲1	▼6
Leader before election
Stanley Henig
Labour
Leader after election
Tricia Heath
Morecambe Bay Independents
No overall control

The 1999 Lancaster City Council election took place on 6 May 1999 to elect members of Lancaster City Council in Lancashire, England. This was the same day as other local elections in England.

== Election Results ==
1999 Lancaster City Council
Party	Candidates	Seats	Gains	Losses	Net gain/loss	Seats %	Votes %	Votes	+/−
MB Independent		22				36.6			
Labour	55	17	0	13	▼13			25,545	
Conservative	34	8	1	0	▲1			13,626	
Liberal Democrats	15	6	3	2	▲1			8,455	
Green		5	5	0	▲5			8,577	
Independent	0	3							

== Ward Results ==
=== Alexandra ===
Alexandra (3 seats)
Party	Candidate	Votes	%	±%
Labour	Peter Robinson*	550	19.5	
Labour	Trevor Tattersall*	515	18.2	
Labour	David Whitaker	513	18.2	
Independent	Duncan T.	421	14.9	
Independent	Morris L.	348	12.3	
Independent	Wilson M.	321	11.4	
Conservative	Marjorie Bainbridge	156	5.5	
Turnout		2,824		
Labour hold				
Labour hold				
Labour hold				

=== Arkholme ===
Arkholme (1 seat)
Party	Candidate	Votes	%	±%
Conservative	James Airey*	581	82.6	
Labour	Janette Gardner	122	17.4	
Turnout		703		
Conservative hold				

=== Bolton-Le-Sands ===
Bolton-Le-Sands (2 seats)
Party	Candidate	Votes	%	±%
Independent	Keith Budden*	750	29.2	
Conservative	Arthur Briggs*	612	23.9	
Conservative	John Geoff Marsden	504	19.6	
Independent	White T.	441	17.2	
Labour	Kavanagh S. Ms.	258	10.1	
Turnout		2,565		
Independent hold				
Conservative hold				

=== Bulk ===
Bulk (3 seats)
Party	Candidate	Votes	%	±%
Labour	Ian Barker	1,101	22.1	
Labour	Abbott Bryning	1,018	20.4	
Labour	Jean Elizabeth Yates*	951	19.1	
Green	Hannah C. Ms.	520	10.4	
Green	Cumner D.	449	9.0	
Green	Chris Hart	415	8.3	
Liberal Democrats	Thomas Barney	302	6.1	
Conservative	Buckley P.	227	4.6	
Turnout		4,983	34.9	
Labour hold				
Labour hold				
Labour hold				

=== Carnforth ===
Carnforth (2 seats)
Party	Candidate	Votes	%	±%
Labour	Edna Jones*	552	20.6	
Independent	Gregory Beaman	544	20.3	
Labour	Thompson I.	527	19.7	
Independent	Beaman J. Ms.	487	18.2	
Conservative	Anthony Johnson	307	11.5	
Conservative	Greer K.	260	9.7	
Turnout		2,677	33.1	
Labour hold				
Independent gain from Labour				

=== Castle ===
Castle (3 seats)
Party	Candidate	Votes	%	±%
Green	Jon Barry	1,816	24.4	
Green	Gina Dowding	1,412	19.0	
Green	Sandra Greaves	1,255	16.9	
Labour	Sutton J.	856	11.5	
Labour	Rye P.	852	11.5	
Labour	Stanley Henig	543	7.3	
Liberal Democrats	Rebecca Livesley	378	5.1	
Conservative	Palmer E.	328	4.4	
Turnout		7,440	42.7	
Green gain from Labour				
Green gain from Labour				
Green gain from Labour				

=== Caton ===
Caton (2 seats)
Party	Candidate	Votes	%	±%
Liberal Democrats	Patricia Quinton*	933	36.6	
Liberal Democrats	Joyce Pritchard	750	29.4	
Conservative	Joan Jackson	602	23.6	
Labour	Robert Clark	150	5.9	
Labour	Richard Newman-Thompson	115	4.5	
Turnout		2,550	58.3	
Liberal Democrats hold				
Liberal Democrats hold				

=== Ellel ===
Ellel (2 seats)
Party	Candidate	Votes	%	±%
Conservative	Helen Helme	543	23.4	
Conservative	Susan Charles	440	19.0	
Liberal Democrats	Bovey A.	351	15.1	
Labour	Glaister D. Ms.	288	12.4	
Labour	William Glaister	286	12.3	
Liberal Democrats	James Talbot	242	10.4	
Independent	Beach N. Ms.	169	7.3	
Turnout		2,319	39.0	
Conservative hold				
Conservative hold				

=== Halton-With-Aughton ===
Halton-With-Aughton (1 seat)
Party	Candidate	Votes	%	±%
Independent	Paul Woodruff*	684	75.3	
Conservative	Jane Brown	151	16.6	
Labour	Mick Varey	73	8.0	
Turnout		908	50.1	
Independent hold				

=== Harbour ===
Harbour (2 seats)
Party	Candidate	Votes	%	±%
MB Independent	David Kerr	789	29.3	
MB Independent	Westwell N.	735	27.3	
Labour	Stanley D.	588	21.8	
Labour	Bush E. Ms.	584	21.7	
Turnout		2,696	35.3	
MB Independent gain from Labour				
MB Independent gain from Labour				

=== Heysham Central ===
Heysham Central (2 seats)
Party	Candidate	Votes	%	±%
MB Independent	Joyce Taylor	884	39.6	
MB Independent	Geoffrey Knight	786	35.2	
Conservative	Ken Brown	361	16.2	
Labour	Maskrey H.	202	9.0	
Turnout		2,233	45.1	
MB Independent hold				
MB Independent hold				

=== Heysham North ===
Heysham North (2 seats)
Party	Candidate	Votes	%	±%
Independent	England P. Ms.	480	26.9	
Independent	Morris P.	425	23.8	
Labour	Janice Hanson*	404	22.6	
Labour	Tomlinson E. Ms.	335	18.8	
Conservative	Caroline Airey	141	7.9	
Turnout		1,785	32.8	
Independent gain from Independent				
Independent gain from Labour				

=== Heysham South ===
Heysham South (3 seats)
Party	Candidate	Votes	%	±%
MB Independent	Lee D. Ms.	1,062	21.0	
MB Independent	Philip Lee	972	19.2	
MB Independent	Michael Greenall	966	19.1	
Labour	Albert Hayden Thornton*	574	11.3	
Labour	Alan Biddulph	530	10.5	
Labour	Richard William Martin	504	10.0	
Conservative	John Wild	452	8.9	
Turnout		5,060	85.1	
MB Independent hold				
MB Independent hold				
MB Independent hold				

=== Hornby ===
Hornby (1 seat)
Party	Candidate	Votes	%	±%
Conservative	Lamb R.*	650	72.1	
Liberal Democrats	Humphreys H.	252	27.9	
Turnout		902	58.7	
Conservative hold				

=== John O'Gaunt ===
John O'Gaunt (3 seats)
Party	Candidate	Votes	%	±%
Labour	Mary Blamire	941	18.9	
Labour	Patrick Kavanagh	914	18.4	
Labour	Joseph Ravetz	767	15.4	
Liberal Democrats	Scott E. Ms.	496	10.0	
Liberal Democrats	Bird D. Ms.	489	9.8	
Conservative	Kirk R.	420	8.4	
Green	Wheeler G.	385	7.7	
Conservative	Wilson R.	359	7.2	
Independent	Simpson I.	207	4.2	
Turnout		4,978	31.1	
Labour hold				
Labour hold				
Labour hold				

=== Kellet ===
Kellet (1 seat)
Party	Candidate	Votes	%	±%
Conservative	John Mace	375	49.5	
Independent	Featherstone A. Ms.	267	35.2	
Labour	King D.	116	15.3	
Turnout		758	47.1	
Conservative hold				

=== Overton ===
Overton (1 seat)
Party	Candidate	Votes	%	±%
MB Independent	Mort Allan	406	46.1	
Independent	Rainford M. Ms.*	307	34.8	
Labour	Riddell W.	168	19.1	
Turnout		881	31.8	
MB Independent hold				

=== Parks ===
Parks (2 seats)
Party	Candidate	Votes	%	±%
MB Independent	John Fretwell	1,202	41.0	
MB Independent	June Ashworth	935	31.9	
Conservative	Race J. Ms.	408	13.9	
Labour	Retallick S. Ms.	200	6.8	
Independent	Pearson B.	188	6.4	
Turnout		2,933	47.5	
MB Independent hold				
MB Independent hold				

=== Poulton ===
Poulton (3 seats)
Party	Candidate	Votes	%	±%
MB Independent	Shirley Burns	838	20.1	
MB Independent	Patricia Heath	810	19.5	
MB Independent	Mark Turner	703	16.9	
MB Independent	Evelyn Archer	469	11.3	
Labour	Terrie Metcalfe*	389	9.3	
Labour	Campbell E.	379	9.1	
Labour	Beryl Spelling	347	8.3	
Conservative	Susan Bray	226	5.4	
Turnout		4,161	35.6	
MB Independent hold				
MB Independent hold				
MB Independent hold				

=== Scotforth East ===
Scotforth East (3 seats)
Party	Candidate	Votes	%	±%
Liberal Democrats	Janie Kirkman	851	13.6	
Liberal Democrats	John Gilbert	850	13.6	
Liberal Democrats	Simpson C. Ms.	771	12.3	
Labour	Eileen Blamire	734	11.7	
Labour	Pam Pickles	694	11.1	
Labour	Kay A.	658	10.5	
Conservative	Kennedy G.	521	8.3	
Conservative	Davenport J.	476	7.6	
Conservative	Richbell O.	468	7.5	
Green	Walker M.	240	3.8	
Turnout		6,263	30.8	
Liberal Democrats gain from Labour				
Liberal Democrats gain from Labour				
Liberal Democrats gain from Labour				

=== Scotforth West ===
Scotforth West (3 seats)
Party	Candidate	Votes	%	±%
Green	Emily Heath	805	14.4	
Labour	Sheila Denwood	706	12.6	
Green	Tony Pinkney	696	12.4	
Labour	Fearnley J.	601	10.7	
Green	Sivell L. Ms.	584	10.4	
Labour	Ian Carey Hilton	560	10.0	
Conservative	Val Outram	464	8.3	
Conservative	Sykes D.	446	8.0	
Conservative	Paula J. Ms.	416	7.4	
Liberal Democrats	Hodge A.	331	5.9	
Turnout		5,609	41.3	
Green gain from Labour				
Labour hold				
Green gain from Labour				

=== Silverdale ===
Silverdale (1 seat)
Party	Candidate	Votes	%	±%
Conservative	Sarah Fishwick	500	56.6	
Liberal Democrats	Henderson R.*	383	43.4	
Turnout		883	51.5	
Conservative gain from Liberal Democrats				

=== Skerton Central ===
Skerton Central (2 seats)
Party	Candidate	Votes	%	±%
Labour	Charles Grattan	Unopposed		
Labour	Janet Horner	Unopposed		
Turnout		0	0.0	
Labour hold				
Labour hold				

=== Skerton East ===
Skerton East (2 seats)
Party	Candidate	Votes	%	±%
Labour	John Harrison	516	31.9	
Labour	Robert Redfern	487	30.1	
Independent	Simpson H.	317	19.6	
Independent	Simpson P. Ms.	300	18.5	
Turnout		1,620	30.7	
Labour hold				
Labour hold				

=== Skerton West ===
Skerton West (2 seats)
Party	Candidate	Votes	%	±%
Labour	Thomas Penney	575	28.1	
Labour	Roger Sherlock*	540	26.4	
Independent	Atkinson D.	350	17.1	
Independent	Broad P.	295	14.4	
Conservative	James Airey	289	14.1	
Turnout		2,049	32.6	
Labour hold				
Labour hold				

=== Slyne-With-Hest ===
Slyne-With-Hest (2 seats)
Party	Candidate	Votes	%	±%
Conservative	Evans T.	657	32.5	
Conservative	Rostron S. Ms.	647	32.0	
Liberal Democrats	Jones S.	391	19.4	
Labour	McKendry G.	324	16.0	
Turnout		2,019	41.8	
Conservative hold				
Conservative hold				

=== Torrisholme ===
Torrisholme (2 seats)
Party	Candidate	Votes	%	±%
Liberal Democrats	Ronald Day	685	26.9	
MB Independent	Evelyn Ashworth	602	23.7	
MB Independent	David Christley	508	20.0	
Labour	Blenkinship M.	384	15.1	
Conservative	Russell Walsh	365	14.3	
Turnout		2,544	42.8	
Liberal Democrats hold				
MB Independent gain from Liberal Democrats				

=== Victoria ===
Victoria (3 seats)
Party	Candidate	Votes	%	±%
MB Independent	Geoffrey Wilson	1,032	21.4	
MB Independent	Broad C. Ms.	1,032	21.4	
MB Independent	Anthony Wade	977	20.2	
Labour	Steven Ormerod	537	11.1	
Labour	Clifford I.	507	10.5	
Labour	Tomlinson T.	501	10.4	
Conservative	Michael Donald Huett	246	5.1	
Turnout		4,832	37.3	
MB Independent hold				
MB Independent hold				
MB Independent hold				

=== Warton ===
Warton (1 seat)
Party	Candidate	Votes	%	±%
MB Independent	David Barker	453	57.0	
Conservative	Peter Thomas Williamson	180	22.6	
Labour	Paul Malcolm Gardner	162	20.4	
Turnout		795	42.5	
MB Independent gain from Labour				
