= 2017 Lancashire County Council election =

Election in the United Kingdom

- 4 May 2017

All 84 seats to Lancashire County Council 43 seats needed for a majority
	First party	Second party
Leader	Geoff Driver	Jennifer Mein
Party	Conservative	Labour
Last election	35	40
Seats before	35	39
Seats won	46	30
Seat change	▲11	▼9
Popular vote	150,048	117,670
Percentage	45.2%	35.4%
Swing	▲11.5%	▼0.9%
	Third party	Fourth party
Party	Liberal Democrats	Green
Last election	5	1
Seats before	6	1
Seats won	4	1
Seat change	▼1	0
Popular vote	31,476	11,293
Percentage	9.5%	3.4%
Swing	▲1.5%	▲0.8%
- Map showing the results of the 2017 Lancashire County Council election.
Council control before election
No overall control
Council control after election
Conservative

An election to Lancashire County Council took place on 4 May 2017 as part of the 2017 local elections across the UK. All 84 councillors were elected for single-member and dual-member divisions for a four-year term of office. The system of voting used is first-past-the-post. Elections are held in all electoral divisions across the present ceremonial county, excepting Blackpool and Blackburn with Darwen which are unitary authorities. (Note: All locally registered electors (British, Irish, Commonwealth and European Union citizens) who are aged 18 or over may vote in the local elections. Those who were temporarily away from their ordinary address (for example, away working, on holiday, in student accommodation or in hospital) are also entitled to vote in the local elections.)

Conservative councillors won an overall majority in the council and formed a majority administration, Labour councillors form the second-largest grouping and UKIP's win of a seat was its single gain nationally in the 2017 local election cycle which saw all 145 of its other candidates standing in the election lose their seats.

== Electoral divisions ==
Boundary revisions by the Local Government Boundary Commission for England meant these elections were fought on new divisions.

== Summary ==
Summary of results	Burnley	Chorley	Fylde	Hyndburn	Lancaster	Pendle	Preston	Ribble Valley	Rossendale	South Ribble	West Lancashire	Wyre	Total
Conservative	1	4	4	1	5	3	2	4	5	6	4	7	46
Labour	3	4	0	5	4	2	6	0	0	1	4	1	30
Liberal Democrats	1	0	0	0	0	1	1	0	0	1	0	0	4
Independent	0	0	2	0	0	0	0	0	0	0	0	0	2
Green	0	0	0	0	1	0	0	0	0	0	0	0	1
UKIP	1	0	0	0	0	0	0	0	0	0	0	0	1

== District seat summaries ==
=== Burnley borough ===
Seat	Result	Majority
Burnley Central East	Labour hold	1,215
Burnley Central West	Labour hold	23
Burnley North East	Labour hold	472
Burnley Rural	Conservative GAIN from Liberal Democrat	529
Burnley South West	Liberal Democrat hold	214
Padiham and Burnley West	UK Independence Party GAIN from Labour	228

=== Chorley borough ===
Seat	Result	Majority
Chorley Central	Labour hold	963
Chorley North	Labour hold	1,114
Chorley Rural East	Labour hold	1,123
Chorley Rural West	Conservative hold	685
Chorley South	Labour hold	1,009
Clayton with Whittle	Conservative GAIN from Labour	490
Euxton, Buckshaw & Astley	Conservative GAIN from Labour	498
Hoghton with Wheelton	Conservative GAIN from Labour	95

=== Fylde borough ===
Seat	Result	Majority
Fylde East	Independent hold	896
Fylde South	Conservative hold	1,016
Fylde West	Independent hold	149
Lytham	Conservative hold	526
St Annes North	Conservative hold	1,255
St Annes South	Conservative hold	1,593

=== Hyndburn borough ===
Seat	Result	Majority
Accrington North	Labour hold	834
Accrington South	Labour hold	90
Accrington West & Oswaldtwistle Central	Labour hold	1,464
Great Harwood, Rishton & Clayton-le-Moors (2-member division)	Labour hold	N/A
Great Harwood, Rishton & Clayton-le-Moors (2-member division)	Labour hold	N/A
Oswaldtwistle	Conservative hold	999

=== Lancaster city ===
Seat	Result	Majority
Heysham	Conservative hold	612
Lancaster Central	Green hold	1,085
Lancaster East	Labour hold	767
Lancaster Rural East	Conservative hold	1,369
Lancaster Rural North	Conservative hold	1,124
Lancaster South East	Labour hold	664
Morecambe Central	Labour hold	486
Morecambe North	Conservative hold	1,566
Morecambe South	Conservative GAIN from Labour	284
Skerton	Labour hold	543

=== Pendle borough ===
Seat	Result	Majority
Brierfield & Nelson West	Labour hold	716
Nelson East	Labour hold	1,159
Pendle Central	Conservative GAIN from Liberal Democrats	353
Pendle Hill	Conservative Win	2,265
Pendle Rural	Conservative Win	N/A
Pendle Rural	Liberal Democrat Win	N/A

=== Preston city ===
Seat	Result	Majority
Preston Central East	Labour hold	1,992
Preston Central West	Labour hold	971
Preston City	Labour hold	1,669
Preston East	Labour hold	337
Preston North	Conservative hold	1,645
Preston Rural	Conservative hold	2,150
Preston South East	Labour hold	1,672
Preston South West	Labour Win	120
Preston West	Liberal Democrat hold	271

=== Ribble Valley borough ===
Seat	Result	Majority
Clitheroe	Conservative hold	5
Longridge with Bowland	Conservative hold	1,685
Ribble Valley North East	Conservative hold	2,208
Ribble Valley South West	Conservative hold	2,081

=== Rossendale borough ===
Seat	Result	Majority
Mid Rossendale	Conservative GAIN from Labour	8
Rossendale East	Conservative GAIN from Labour	89
Rossendale South	Conservative hold	327
Rossendale West	Conservative hold	517
Whitworth & Bacup	Conservative GAIN from Labour	17

=== South Ribble borough ===
Seat	Result	Majority
Leyland Central	Labour hold	183
Leyland South	Conservative hold	296
Lostock Hall & Bamber Bridge	Conservative hold	322
Moss Side & Farington	Conservative hold	1,511
Penwortham East & Walton-le-Dale	Conservative hold	561
Penwortham West	Liberal Democrat hold	449
South Ribble East	Conservative hold	1,383
South Ribble West	Conservative hold	2,381

=== West Lancashire borough ===
Seat	Result	Majority
Burscough & Rufford	Conservative hold	195
Ormskirk	Labour hold	661
Skelmersdale Central	Labour hold	2,224
Skelmersdale East	Labour hold	629
Skelmersdale West	Labour hold	1,646
West Lancashire East	Conservative hold	913
West Lancashire North	Conservative hold	989
West Lancashire West	Conservative GAIN from Labour	883

=== Wyre borough ===
Seat	Result	Majority
Cleveleys East	Conservative hold	1,214
Cleveleys South & Carleton	Conservative hold	1,590
Fleetwood East	Labour hold	727
Fleetwood West & Cleveleys West	Conservative hold	565
Poulton-le-Fylde	Conservative hold	2,132
Thorton & Hambleton	Conservative hold	1,543
Wyre Rural Central	Conservative hold	2,030
Wyre Rural East	Conservative hold	1,025

== Division results by district ==
=== Burnley ===
Burnley Central East
Party	Candidate	Votes	%	±%
Labour	Sobia Malik	1,820	60.4	+2.3
Conservative	Ellen Sunter	605	20.1	+14.9
Liberal Democrats	Emma Payne	403	13.4	–2.1
Green	Laura Fisk	185	6.1	N/A
Majority		1,215	40.3	
Turnout		3,033	27.8	
Registered electors		10,906		
Labour hold		Swing	▼6.3	

Burnley Central West
Party	Candidate	Votes	%	±%
Labour	Tony Martin*	927	28.8	–8.2
Liberal Democrats	Neil Mottershead	904	28.1	–8.7
Conservative	Andrew Newhouse	685	21.3	+6.2
Green	Andy Fewings	327	10.2	N/A
UKIP	Tom Commins	237	7.4	N/A
Independent	David Roper	140	4.3	N/A
Majority		23	0.7	
Turnout		3,228	30.2	
Registered electors		10,706		
Labour hold		Swing	▲0.3	

Burnley North East
Party	Candidate	Votes	%	±%
Labour	Terry Burns*	1,715	48.6	–8.0
Liberal Democrats	Gordon Birtwistle	1,243	35.2	+20.4
Conservative	David Heginbotham	487	13.8	+6.0
Green	Jai Redman	83	2.4	N/A
Majority		472	13.4	
Turnout		3,543	34.0	
Registered electors		10,416		
Labour hold		Swing	▼14.2	

Burnley Rural
Party	Candidate	Votes	%	±%
Conservative	Cosima Towneley	1,420	38.7	+22.4
Liberal Democrats	Tracy Kennedy	891	24.3	–10.4
Labour	Lugna Khan	552	15.0	–14.1
Independent	Margaret Brindle*	380	10.4	N/A
UKIP	Alison Williams	313	8.5	–10.0
Green	Barbara Baldwin	113	3.1	N/A
Majority		529	14.4	
Turnout		3,677	32.7	
Registered electors		11,250		
Conservative gain from Liberal Democrats		Swing	▲16.4	

Burnley South West
Party	Candidate	Votes	%	±%
Liberal Democrats	Jeff Sumner*	1,195	37.5	+2.8
Labour	Lian Pate	981	30.8	+1.7
Conservative	Dale Ferrier	655	20.6	+4.3
Independent	Bill Brindle	213	6.7	N/A
Green	Ceri Carmichael	140	4.4	N/A
Majority		214	6.7	
Turnout		3,199	28.2	
Registered electors		11,352		
Liberal Democrats hold		Swing	▲0.6	

Padiham & Burnley West
Party	Candidate	Votes	%	±%
UKIP	Alan Hosker	1,234	36.5	N/A
Labour	Marcus Johnstone*	1,006	29.8	–24.6
Conservative	Ivor Emo	714	21.1	+2.4
Liberal Democrats	Mark Payne	335	9.9	–3.6
Green	Anne Whittles	63	1.9	N/A
TUSC	Gavin Hartley	27	0.8	N/A
Majority		228	6.7	
Turnout		3,381	32.6	
Registered electors		10,369		
UKIP gain from Labour				

=== Chorley ===
Chorley Central
Party	Candidate	Votes	%
Labour	Steve Holgate*	2,393	52.7
Conservative	Mick Muncaster	1,440	31.7
UKIP	Shaun Jones	269	5.9
Independent	William Carpenter	237	5.2
Liberal Democrats	David Porter	206	4.5
Majority		953	21.0
Turnout		4,553	41.7
Registered electors		10,916	
Labour win (new seat)			

Chorley North
Party	Candidate	Votes	%	±%
Labour	Hasina Khan	2,032	59.5	+19.8
Conservative	Greg Morgan	918	26.9	–16.6
UKIP	Tommy Shorrock	278	8.1	–8.7
Liberal Democrats	Rebecca Wilson	188	5.5	N/A
Majority		1,114	32.6	
Turnout		3,421	34.5	
Registered electors		9,917		
Labour gain from Conservative		Swing	▲18.2	

Chorley Rural East
Party	Candidate	Votes	%	±%
Labour	Kim Snape*	2,503	59.3	+12.5
Conservative	Peter Malpas	1,380	32.7	–2.5
Liberal Democrats	Philip Pilling	128	3.0	N/A
UKIP	Hayden Suart	118	2.8	–15.2
Green	Andrew Whitson	93	2.2	N/A
Majority		1,123	26.6	
Turnout		4,232	44.7	
Registered electors		9,465		
Labour hold		Swing	▲7.5	

Chorley Rural West
Party	Candidate	Votes	%	±%
Conservative	Keith Iddon*	2,364	51.6	+5.2
Labour	Alan Whittaker	1,679	36.6	+1.1
Liberal Democrats	John Wright	347	7.6	N/A
UKIP	Julia Smith	195	4.3	–13.8
Majority		685	15.0	
Turnout		4,591	42.9	
Registered electors		10,696		
Conservative hold		Swing	▲2.1	

Chorley South
Party	Candidate	Votes	%	±%
Labour	Julia Berry	2,048	53.0	+0.4
Conservative	Phil Loynes	1,039	26.9	+3.3
Liberal Democrats	Simon Thomson	581	15.0	+12.4
UKIP	Mark Smith	197	5.1	–13.2
Majority		1,009	26.1	
Turnout		3,871	33.7	
Registered electors		11,489		
Labour hold		Swing	▼1.5	

Clayton with Whittle
Party	Candidate	Votes	%
Conservative	Mark Perks*	2,056	53.5
Labour	Mark Clifford	1,566	40.8
UKIP	Christopher Suart	218	5.7
Majority		490	12.7
Turnout		3,851	37.6
Registered electors		10,230	
Conservative win (new seat)			

Euxton, Buckshaw & Astley
Party	Candidate	Votes	%
Conservative	Aidy Riggott	2,506	52.6
Labour	Matthew Lynch	2,008	42.2
UKIP	Jeffery Mallinson	247	5.2
Majority		498	10.4
Turnout		4,773	41.6
Registered electors		11,466	
Conservative win (new seat)			

Hoghton with Wheelton
Party	Candidate	Votes	%
Conservative	Andrew Snowden	1,925	46.5
Labour	Margaret France	1,830	44.2
Liberal Democrats	Stephen Fenn	242	5.8
Green	Gillian Hargreaves	140	3.4
Majority		95	2.3
Turnout		4,143	42.1
Registered electors		9,851	
Conservative win (new seat)			

=== Fylde ===
Fylde East
Party	Candidate	Votes	%	±%
Independent	Liz Oades*	1,889	52.0	–6.4
Conservative	Steve Rigby	993	27.3	+11.2
Labour	Jayne Boardman	519	14.3	+3.3
UKIP	Noel Matthews	230	6.3	–6.6
Majority		896	24.7	
Turnout		3,640	34.3	
Registered electors		10,604		
Independent hold		Swing	▼8.8	

Fylde South
Party	Candidate	Votes	%	±%
Conservative	Paul Rigby*	1,779	55.7	+13.4
Independent	Julie Brickles	763	23.9	+2.1
Labour	Steven McGuinness	499	15.6	+2.0
Liberal Democrats	Robert Fielding	151	4.7	N/A
Majority		1,016	31.8	
Turnout		3,202	36.3	
Registered electors		8,823		
Conservative hold		Swing	▲5.6	

Fydle West
Party	Candidate	Votes	%	±%
Independent	Paul Hayhurst*	1,837	44.5	+5.4
Conservative	Sandra Pitman	1,688	40.9	+13.6
Labour	Guy Cooper	372	9.0	±0.0
UKIP	Brook Wimbury	121	2.9	–18.0
Liberal Democrats	Beverley Harrison	106	2.6	N/A
Majority		149	3.6	
Turnout		4,128	41.2	
Registered electors		10,030		
Independent hold		Swing	▼4.1	

Lytham
Party	Candidate	Votes	%	±%
Conservative	Tim Ashton*	1,901	45.9	–2.2
Ratepayers	Roger Lloyd	1,375	33.2	N/A
Labour	Gareth Nash	380	9.2	+2.6
Liberal Democrats	Christine Marshall	238	5.7	–12.5
UKIP	Tim Wood	128	3.1	–18.5
Green	Duncan Royle	109	2.6	–2.9
TUSC	Joshua Kelly	15	0.4	N/A
Majority		526	12.7	
Turnout		4,155	40.1	
Registered electors		10,373		
Conservative hold				

St Annes North
Party	Candidate	Votes	%	±%
Conservative	Peter Buckley*	2,205	56.7	+21.5
Liberal Democrats	Karen Henshaw	950	24.4	–4.4
Labour	Peter Stephenson	539	13.8	–0.9
Green	Christine Toothill	198	5.1	+1.6
Majority		1,255	32.3	
Turnout		3,902	38.4	
Registered electors		10,174		
Conservative hold		Swing	▲13.0	

St Annes South
Party	Candidate	Votes	%	±%
Conservative	Edward Nash	2,244	61.1	+21.2
Labour	Ruth Hurley	651	17.7	+1.5
Liberal Democrats	Andrew Holland	432	11.8	–4.5
Green	Ian Roberts	343	9.3	+3.7
Majority		1,593	43.4	
Turnout		3,680	35.4	
Registered electors		10,393		
Conservative hold		Swing	▲9.9	

=== Hyndburn ===
Accrington North
Party	Candidate	Votes	%	±%
Labour	Loraine Cox	1,976	63.4	+24.0
Conservative	Josh Allen	1,142	36.6	+13.4
Majority		834	26.8	
Turnout		3,134	29.2	
Registered electors		10,736		
Labour hold		Swing	▲5.3	

Accrington South
Party	Candidate	Votes	%	±%
Labour	Bernard Dawson*	1,689	47.1	+6.1
Conservative	Kath Pratt	1,599	44.6	+8.9
UKIP	Stewart Scott	296	8.3	–11.0
Majority		90	2.5	
Turnout		3,597	34.2	
Registered electors		10,523		
Labour hold		Swing	▼1.4	

Accrington West & Oswaldtwistle Central
Party	Candidate	Votes	%
Labour	Munsif Dad*	2,466	66.7
Conservative	Judith Addison	1,002	27.1
UKIP	Kenneth Smith	227	6.1
Majority		1,464	39.6
Turnout		3,711	34.2
Registered electors		10,868	
Labour win (new seat)			

Great Harwood, Rishton & Clayton-le-Moors (2 seats)
Party	Candidate	Votes	%
Labour	Miles Parkinson*	2,926	45.6
Labour	Jenny Molineux	2,850	44.4
Conservative	Patrick McGinley	2,824	44.0
Conservative	Ann Scaife	2,686	41.9
UKIP	Bret Matthew	591	9.2
Green	Joan West	512	8.0
UKIP	John Taylor	435	6.8
Turnout		6,726	32.5
Registered electors		20,714	
Labour win (new seat)			
Labour win (new seat)			

Oswaldtwistle
Party	Candidate	Votes	%	±%
Conservative	Peter Britcliffe*	1,935	56.2	+14.6
Labour	Colette McCormack	936	27.2	–2.7
UKIP	Janet Brown	571	16.6	–12.0
Majority		999	29.0	
Turnout		3,453	33.9	
Registered electors		10,173		
Conservative hold		Swing	▲8.7	

=== Lancaster ===
Heysham
Party	Candidate	Votes	%	±%
Conservative	Andrew Gardiner	1,758	51.8	+15.4
Labour	Paul Gardner	1,146	33.8	–1.1
UKIP	Robert Gillespie	255	7.5	–14.0
Liberal Democrats	Michael Mumford	144	4.2	N/A
Green	Connor Dowding	88	2.6	±0.0
Majority		612	18.0	
Turnout		3,398	31.2	
Registered electors		10,905		
Conservative hold		Swing	▲8.3	

Lancaster Central
Party	Candidate	Votes	%	±%
Green	Gina Dowding*	2,206	51.8	+13.4
Labour	Anthony Cutter	1,121	26.3	–4.2
Conservative	Kieran Cooke	858	20.1	+0.9
UKIP	Robert Watson	75	1.8	–6.2
Majority		1,085	25.5	
Turnout		4,270	42.2	
Registered electors		10,128		
Green hold		Swing	▲8.8	

Lancaster East
Party	Candidate	Votes	%	±%
Labour	Lizzi Collinge	2,010	53.4	+8.5
Green	Theo Routh	1,243	33.0	–8.0
Conservative	Joe Wrennall	384	10.2	+0.1
Liberal Democrats	James Harvey	129	3.4	N/A
Majority		767	20.4	
Turnout		3,772	34.2	
Registered electors		11,022		
Labour hold		Swing	▲8.3	

Lancaster Rural East
Party	Candidate	Votes	%	±%
Conservative	Susie Charles*	2,309	54.0	+10.8
Labour	Matthew Whittaker	940	22.0	+0.7
Liberal Democrats	Peter Jackson	738	17.3	+6.8
Green	Mike Wright	290	6.8	–0.5
Majority		1,369	32.0	
Turnout		4,283	43.2	
Registered electors		9,912		
Conservative hold		Swing	▲5.1	

Lancaster Rural North
Party	Candidate	Votes	%	±%
Conservative	Phillippa Williamson	2,298	55.0	+11.0
Labour	John Reynolds	1,174	28.1	–1.1
Liberal Democrats	Tony Bunting	537	12.9	N/A
Green	Cait Sinclair	167	4.0	–3.5
Majority		1,124	26.9	
Turnout		4,186	44.2	
Registered electors		9,480		
Conservative hold		Swing	▲6.1	

Lancaster South East
Party	Candidate	Votes	%	±%
Labour	Erica Lewis	1,814	46.2	+6.4
Conservative	Janet Walton	1,150	29.3	–0.4
Green	Abi Mills	597	15.2	+4.7
Liberal Democrats	Robin Long	369	9.4	–0.5
Majority		664	16.9	
Turnout		3,941	32.5	
Registered electors		12,117		
Labour hold		Swing	▲3.4	

Morecambe Central
Party	Candidate	Votes	%
Labour	Margaret Pattison	1,512	49.9
Conservative	Stuart Morris	1,026	33.9
UKIP	Mark Knight	274	9.0
Liberal Democrats	Catherine Pilling	136	4.5
Green	Gisela Renolds	81	2.7
Majority		486	16.0
Turnout		3,035	27.5
Registered electors		11,057	
Labour win (new seat)			

Morecambe North
Party	Candidate	Votes	%	±%
Conservative	Tony Jones*	2,404	63.2	+17.0
Labour	Janette Gardner	838	22.0	–3.8
Liberal Democrats	Phil Dunster	310	8.1	N/A
Green	Phil Chandler	253	6.6	+1.8
Majority		1,566	41.2	
Turnout		3,814	37.6	
Registered electors		10,157		
Conservative hold		Swing	▲10.4	

Morecambe South
Party	Candidate	Votes	%	±%
Conservative	Charles Edwards	1,613	49.1	+21.2
Labour	Darren Clifford*	1,329	40.4	+9.9
UKIP	Nigel Turner	344	10.5	–11.0
Majority		284	8.7	
Turnout		3,301	30.8	
Registered electors		10,732		
Conservative gain from Labour		Swing	▲5.7	

Skerton
Party	Candidate	Votes	%	±%
Labour	Hilda Parr	1,370	53.0	–6.9
Conservative	Stuart Bateson	827	32.0	+4.8
UKIP	Carol Bruce	195	7.5	N/A
Liberal Democrats	Derek Kaye	195	7.5	N/A
Majority		543	21.0	
Turnout		2,599	26.2	
Registered electors		9,939		
Labour hold		Swing	▼5.9	

=== Pendle ===
Brierfield & Nelson West
Party	Candidate	Votes	%
Labour	Mohammed Iqbal*	3,518	52.7
Conservative	Mohammed Anwar	2,802	42.0
Liberal Democrats	Howard Thomas	354	5.3
Majority		716	10.7
Turnout		6,708	58.4
Registered electors		11,482	
Labour win (new seat)			

Nelson East
Party	Candidate	Votes	%
Labour	Azhar Ali*	2,643	57.1
Conservative	Raja Rauf	1,484	32.1
BNP	John Rowe	500	10.8
Majority		1,159	25.0
Turnout		4,646	40.0
Registered electors		11,621	
Labour win (new seat)			

Pendle Central
Party	Candidate	Votes	%	±%
Conservative	Joe Cooney	1,483	42.0	+16.5
Liberal Democrats	Dorothy Lord*	1,130	32.0	+0.2
Labour	Yvonne Tennant	719	20.4	–5.6
BNP	Brian Parker	201	5.7	–7.0
Majority		353	10.0	
Turnout		3,546	32.7	
Registered electors		10,831		
Conservative gain from Liberal Democrats		Swing	▲8.2	

Pendle Hill
Party	Candidate	Votes	%
Conservative	Christian Wakeford*	3,180	69.2
Labour	Manzar Iqbal	915	19.9
Liberal Democrats	James Wood	311	6.8
Green	Ian Barnett	190	4.1
Majority		2,265	49.3
Turnout		4,608	40.9
Registered electors		11,273	
Conservative win (new seat)			

Pendle Rural (2 seats)
Party	Candidate	Votes	%
Conservative	Jenny Purcell	3,911	49.7
Liberal Democrats	David Whipp*	3,485	44.3
Conservative	Paul White*	3,405	43.3
Liberal Democrats	Mary Thomas	2,361	30.0
Independent	Ian Lyons	1,010	12.8
Labour	Wayne Blackburn	959	12.2
Green	Jane Wood	603	7.7
Turnout		8,443	40.0
Registered electors		21,132	
Conservative win (new seat)			
Liberal Democrats win (new seat)			

=== Preston ===
Preston Central East
Party	Candidate	Votes	%
Labour	Frank de Molfetta*	2,672	74.2
Conservative	Sue Whittam	680	18.9
Liberal Democrats	Mike Turner	250	6.9
Majority		1,992	55.3
Turnout		3,615	33.8
Registered electors		10,691	
Labour win (new seat)			

Preston Central West
Party	Candidate	Votes	%
Labour	Carl Crompton*	1,654	55.7
Conservative	Connor Rumble	683	23.0
Liberal Democrats	Claire Craven	446	15.0
UKIP	Samuel Furr	186	6.3
Majority		971	32.7
Turnout		2,975	29.9
Registered electors		9,946	
Labour win (new seat)			

Preston City
Party	Candidate	Votes	%	±%
Labour	Yousuf Motala*	2,324	71.0	+6.7
Conservative	Rowena Edmondson	655	20.0	+7.2
UKIP	Derek Killeen	198	6.0	–8.7
TUSC	Matthew Gordon	98	3.0	N/A
Majority		1,669	51.0	
Turnout		3,304	33.0	
Registered electors		10,019		
Labour hold		Swing	▼0.3	

Preston East
Party	Candidate	Votes	%	±%
Labour	Kevin Ellard*	1,447	46.2	–15.5
Conservative	Keith Sedgewick	1,110	35.4	+20.0
UKIP	Mark Barker	355	11.3	–11.6
Liberal Democrats	Robert Ash	194	6.2	N/A
TUSC	Lucy Nuttall	26	0.8	N/A
Majority		337	10.8	
Turnout		3,135	28.5	
Registered electors		11,017		
Labour hold		Swing	▼17.8	

Preston North
Party	Candidate	Votes	%	±%
Conservative	Geoff Driver*	2,744	59.1	+13.2
Labour	Iain Hams	1,099	23.7	+5.0
Liberal Democrats	Peter Johnston	435	9.4	–10.6
Green	Helen Disley	171	3.7	+0.8
UKIP	Scott Pye	168	3.6	–8.9
TUSC	David Beale	27	0.6	N/A
Majority		1,645	35.4	
Turnout		4,647	41.8	
Registered electors		11,113		
Conservative hold		Swing	▲4.1	

Preston Rural
Party	Candidate	Votes	%	±%
Conservative	George Wilkins*	2,648	70.6	+11.2
Labour	Joshua Mascord	498	13.3	–4.0
Liberal Democrats	David Callaghan	359	9.6	+4.5
UKIP	Simon Platt	139	3.7	–14.4
Green	Anne Fielding	106	2.8	N/A
Majority		2,150	57.3	
Turnout		3,758	40.6	
Registered electors		9,248		
Conservative hold		Swing	▲7.6	

Preston South East
Party	Candidate	Votes	%	±%
Labour	Jennifer Mein*	2,172	74.1	–1.2
Conservative	Jonty Campbell	500	17.1	+9.8
UKIP	Anthony Helps	195	6.7	–7.1
TUSC	Tom Costello	65	2.2	N/A
Majority		1,672	57.0	
Turnout		2,940	26.4	
Registered electors		11,119		
Labour hold		Swing	▼5.5	

Preston South West
Party	Candidate	Votes	%
Labour	Gillian Oliver	1,451	37.2
Conservative	Michael Balshaw	1,331	34.1
Liberal Democrats	Mark Jewell	862	22.1
UKIP	James Bradley	261	6.7
Majority		120	3.1
Turnout		3,910	35.4
Registered electors		11,060	
Labour win (new seat)			

Preston West
Party	Candidate	Votes	%	±%
Liberal Democrats	John Potter	1,676	42.5	+9.8
Conservative	Damien Moore	1,405	35.7	+8.4
Labour	Gill Mascord	627	15.9	–8.6
UKIP	Kieran Aspden	160	4.1	–11.5
Green	Alan Tootill	73	1.9	N/A
Majority		271	6.8	
Turnout		3,947	38.1	
Registered electors		10,355		
Liberal Democrats hold		Swing	▲0.7	

=== Ribble Valley ===
Clitheroe
Party	Candidate	Votes	%	±%
Conservative	Ian Brown*	1,658	42.1	+10.8
Liberal Democrats	Allan Knox	1,653	41.9	+14.4
Labour	Sue Riley	631	16.0	+4.8
Majority		5	0.2	
Turnout		3,951	33.1	
Registered electors		11,932		
Conservative hold		Swing	▼1.8	

Longridge with Bowland
Party	Candidate	Votes	%	±%
Conservative	David Smith*	2,425	69.8	–0.1
Labour	Bryan Dalgleish-Warburton	740	21.3	–1.3
Liberal Democrats	Simon O'Rourke	311	8.9	+1.4
Majority		1,685	48.5	
Turnout		3,488	32.4	
Registered electors		10,767		
Conservative hold		Swing	▲0.6	

Ribble Valley North East
Party	Candidate	Votes	%	±%
Conservative	Albert Atkinson*	2,844	70.4	+16.0
Labour	Anne Taylor	636	15.7	–0.2
Liberal Democrats	Mary Robinson	562	13.9	+7.5
Majority		2,208	54.7	
Turnout		4,051	35.7	
Registered electors		11,362		
Conservative hold		Swing	▲8.1	

Ribble Valley South West
Party	Candidate	Votes	%	±%
Conservative	Alan Schofield*	2,789	68.6	–4.1
Labour	Charles Cathcart	708	17.4	–1.9
Liberal Democrats	Oliver Bell	360	8.9	+0.8
Green	Anne Peplow	206	5.1	N/A
Majority		2,081	51.2	
Turnout		4,072	35.2	
Registered electors		11,581		
Conservative hold		Swing	▼1.1	

=== Rossendale ===
Mid Rossendale
Party	Candidate	Votes	%
Conservative	David Foxcroft	2,194	50.1
Labour	Alyson Barnes	2,186	49.9
Majority		8	0.2
Turnout		4,406	39.9
Registered electors		11,038	
Conservative win (new seat)			

Rossendale East
Party	Candidate	Votes	%	±%
Conservative	Jimmy Eaton	1,635	46.6	+11.5
Labour	Jackie Oakes*	1,546	44.0	+5.2
UKIP	Michael Pickup	198	5.6	–11.1
Green	John Payne	133	3.8	N/A
Majority		89	2.6	
Turnout		3,519	34.8	
Registered electors		10,122		
Conservative gain from Labour		Swing	▲3.2	

Rossendale South
Party	Candidate	Votes	%	±%
Conservative	Anne Cartner Cheetham*	1,852	51.9	+12.2
Labour	Steve Hughes	1,525	42.7	+7.6
Green	Crissie Harter	191	5.4	N/A
Majority		327	9.2	
Turnout		3,575	37.1	
Registered electors		9,631		
Conservative hold		Swing	▲2.3	

Rossendale West
Party	Candidate	Votes	%	±%
Conservative	David Stansfield*	2,066	54.4	+18.5
Labour	Lisa Bloor	1,549	40.8	+6.1
Green	Seb Leaver	181	4.8	N/A
Majority		517	13.6	
Turnout		3,799	35.5	
Registered electors		10,718		
Conservative hold		Swing	▲6.2	

Whitworth & Bacup
Party	Candidate	Votes	%
Conservative	Peter Steen	1,354	44.6
Labour	Sean Serridge*	1,337	44.0
UKIP	Max Lake	295	9.7
National Front	Kevin Bryan	50	1.6
Majority		17	0.6
Turnout		3,050	30.9
Registered electors		9,870	
Conservative win (new seat)			

=== South Ribble ===
Leyland Central
Party	Candidate	Votes	%	±%
Labour	Matthew Tomlinson*	1,895	49.6	+5.9
Conservative	Paul Wharton	1,712	44.8	+9.3
Liberal Democrats	Rick Bridge	212	5.6	+1.0
Majority		183	4.8	
Turnout		3,827	35.6	
Registered electors		10,755		
Labour hold		Swing	▼1.7	

Leyland South
Party	Candidate	Votes	%
Conservative	Jayne Rear	1,806	47.8
Labour	Gail Hodson	1,510	40.0
Liberal Democrats	Paul Valentine	460	12.2
Majority		296	7.8
Turnout		3,786	37.3
Registered electors		10,141	
Conservative win (new seat)			

Lostock Hall & Bamber Bridge
Party	Candidate	Votes	%
Conservative	Jim Marsh	1,753	51.8
Labour	David Watts	1,431	42.3
Liberal Democrats	Marion Hancock	202	6.0
Majority		322	9.5
Turnout		3,396	31.0
Registered electors		10,942	
Conservative win (new seat)			

Moss Side & Farington
Party	Candidate	Votes	%
Conservative	Michael Green*	2,275	68.3
Labour	Lee Jameson	764	22.9
Liberal Democrats	Carol Stunell	292	8.8
Majority		1,511	45.4
Turnout		3,343	36.2
Registered electors		9,244	
Conservative win (new seat)			

Penwortham East & Walton-le-Dale
Party	Candidate	Votes	%
Conservative	Joan Burrows	1,990	54.4
Labour	Sue Prynn*	1,429	39.1
Liberal Democrats	Geoffrey Crewe	236	6.5
Majority		561	15.3
Turnout		3,664	35.8
Registered electors		10,229	
Conservative win (new seat)			

Penwortham West
Party	Candidate	Votes	%
Liberal Democrats	David Howarth*	2,258	47.4
Conservative	Andy Pratt	1,809	38.0
Labour	Christopher Berry	699	14.7
Majority		449	9.4
Turnout		4,779	41.8
Registered electors		11,446	
Liberal Democrats win (new seat)			

South Ribble East
Party	Candidate	Votes	%
Conservative	Barrie Yates*	2,326	65.8
Labour	David Savage	843	23.8
Liberal Democrats	Alison Hesketh-Holt	205	5.8
Green	Andrew Wight	163	4.6
Majority		1,483	42.0
Turnout		3,647	34.7
Registered electors		10,520	
Conservative win (new seat)			

South Ribble West
Party	Candidate	Votes	%
Conservative	Graham Gooch*	3,114	72.7
Labour	Aniela Gelder	733	17.1
Liberal Democrats	David Saul	436	10.2
Majority		2,381	55.6
Turnout		4,293	39.8
Registered electors		10,781	
Conservative win (new seat)			

=== West Lancashire ===
Burscough & Rufford
Party	Candidate	Votes	%
Conservative	Eddie Pope	2,154	52.4
Labour	Cynthia Dereli*	1,959	47.6
Majority		195	4.8
Turnout		4,137	41.5
Registered electors		9,973	
Conservative win (new seat)			

Ormskirk
Party	Candidate	Votes	%
Labour	Nikki Hennessy*	2,100	46.9
Conservative	David Westley*	1,439	32.2
OWL	Gordon Johnson	797	17.8
Green	Gaynor Pickering	137	3.1
Majority		661	14.7
Turnout		4,481	42.2
Registered electors		10,622	
Labour win (new seat)			

Skelmersdale Central
Party	Candidate	Votes	%	±%
Labour	Terence Aldridge*	2,574	88.0	+12.5
Conservative	Samuel Currie	350	12.0	+6.3
Majority		2,224	76.0	
Turnout		2,933	27.2	
Registered electors		10,801		
Labour hold		Swing	▲3.1	

Skelmersdale East
Party	Candidate	Votes	%	±%
Labour	John Fillis*	2,175	58.5	+7.5
Conservative	George Pratt	1,546	41.5	+9.6
Majority		629	17.0	
Turnout		3,738	34.4	
Registered electors		10,877		
Labour hold		Swing	▼1.1	

Skelmersdale West
Party	Candidate	Votes	%	±%
Labour	Julie Gibson*	2,277	71.4	–5.5
Conservative	Ruth Melling	631	19.8	+7.4
Green	William Gilmour	282	8.8	–1.9
Majority		1,646	51.6	
Turnout		3,199	29.8	
Registered electors		10,730		
Labour hold		Swing	▼6.5	

West Lancashire East
Party	Candidate	Votes	%	±%
Conservative	Paul Greenall	1,921	47.2	–9.2
Labour	Gareth Dowling	1,008	24.8	–7.7
OWL	Ian Davis	872	21.4	N/A
Green	Heather Doyle	137	3.4	–7.6
UKIP	John Stewart	130	3.2	N/A
Majority		913	22.4	
Turnout		4,071	37.3	
Registered electors		10,921		
Conservative hold		Swing	▼0.8	

West Lancashire North
Party	Candidate	Votes	%	±%
Conservative	Malcolm Barron*	2,317	55.6	+0.8
Liberal Democrats	Jeffrey Christie	1,328	31.8	N/A
Labour	Andy Pritchard	526	12.6	–10.5
Majority		989	23.8	
Turnout		4,183	36.9	
Registered electors		11,341		
Conservative hold				

West Lancashire West
Party	Candidate	Votes	%	±%
Conservative	David O'Toole*	2,231	62.3	+25.1
Labour	Maureen Mills	1,348	37.7	–6.2
Majority		883	24.6	
Turnout		3,604	35.1	
Registered electors		10,259		
Conservative gain from Labour		Swing	▲15.7	

=== Wyre ===
Cleveleys East
Party	Candidate	Votes	%
Conservative	Andrea Kay*	2,510	65.9
Labour	Rob Fail	1,296	34.1
Majority		1,214	31.8
Turnout		3,816	36.8
Registered electors		10,357	
Conservative win (new seat)			

Cleveleys South & Carleton
Party	Candidate	Votes	%
Conservative	Alan Vincent	2,546	67.5
Labour	Joanne Cooper	956	25.3
Green	Barbara Mead-Mason	272	7.2
Majority		1,590	42.2
Turnout		3,784	37.2
Registered electors		10,164	
Conservative win (new seat)			

Fleetwood East
Party	Candidate	Votes	%	±%
Labour	Lorraine Beavers*	2,028	57.5	+4.6
Conservative	David Shaw	1,301	36.9	+13.4
Green	Michael Pickton	107	3.0	N/A
Independent	Ray Smith	93	2.6	N/A
Majority		727	20.6	
Turnout		3,536	32.3	
Registered electors		10,944		
Labour hold		Swing	▼4.4	

Fleetwood West & Cleveleys West
Party	Candidate	Votes	%
Conservative	Stephen Clarke	1,967	50.4
Labour	Ruth Duffy	1,402	35.9
UKIP	Roy Hopwood	355	9.1
Green	Lynn Cawley	106	2.7
Independent	Jack Harrison	75	1.9
Majority		565	14.5
Turnout		3,912	33.9
Registered electors		11,535	
Conservative win (new seat)			

Poulton-le-Fylde
Party	Candidate	Votes	%	±%
Conservative	Alf Clempson*	2,954	72.1	+17.4
Labour	Michelle Heaton-Bentley	822	20.1	–5.6
Green	Roddy Hanson	321	7.8	N/A
Majority		2,132	52.0	
Turnout		4,110	36.4	
Registered electors		11,291		
Conservative hold		Swing	▲11.6	

Thornton & Hambleton
Party	Candidate	Votes	%
Conservative	John Shedwick*	2,524	72.0
Labour	Andy Meredith	981	28.0
Majority		1,543	44.0
Turnout		3,515	34.5
Registered electors		10,182	
Conservative win (new seat)			

Wyre Rural Central
Party	Candidate	Votes	%
Conservative	Vivien Taylor*	2,714	70.9
Labour	Janet Williams	684	17.9
Green	Ruth Norbury	429	11.2
Majority		2,030	53.0
Turnout		3,833	37.7
Registered electors		10,177	
Conservative win (new seat)			

Wyre Rural East
Party	Candidate	Votes	%
Conservative	Shaun Turner	2,501	51.2
Independent	Sandra Perkins*	1,476	30.2
Labour	Ross Sykes	457	9.4
Green	Joe Gilmour	254	5.2
UKIP	Simon Noble	196	4.0
Majority		1,025	21.0
Turnout		4,892	42.8
Registered electors		11,437	
Conservative win (new seat)			
