= Gina Dowding =

British politician

Cllr Gina Dowding
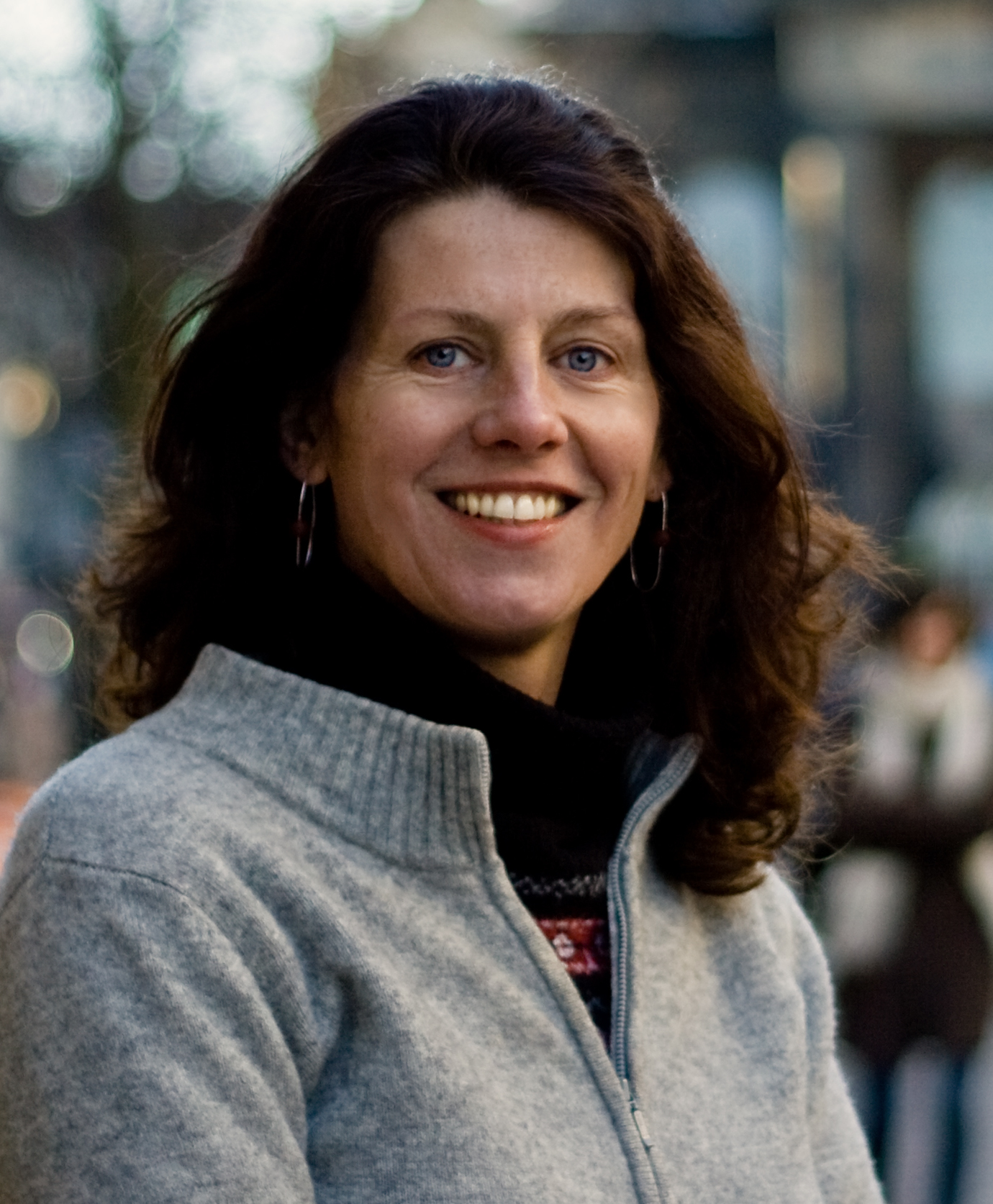
- Dowding in 2010

Member of the European Parliament for North West England
- In office 2 July 2019 – 31 January 2020
- Preceded by: Wajid Khan
- Succeeded by: Constituency abolished

Personal details
- Born: 15 July 1962 (age 63) London, England
- Party: Green Party of England and Wales
- Website: Gina Dowding MEP
Other elected offices
Lancaster City Councillor for Marsh
Incumbent
Assumed office 3 May 2019
Preceded by	Jon Barry
Lancashire County Councillor for Lancaster Central
Incumbent
Assumed office 2 May 2013
Preceded by	Christopher Coates
Lancaster City Councillor for Dukes Castle (1999–2003)
In office 6 May 1999 – 3 May 2007
Preceded by	R. Pye
Succeeded by	Anne Chapman

Gina Dowding (born 15 July 1962) is a British politician who served as a Member of the European Parliament (MEP) for North West England from 2019 to 2020, representing the Green Party of England and Wales. She has been a long-serving local councillor, holding seats on both Lancaster City Council and Lancashire County Council.

== Early life and career ==
Dowding was born in London. She has lived in Lancaster for over 40 years, where she lives in the city centre with her partner and two adult sons.

Before entering full-time politics, she worked in public health in the National Health Service (NHS) and in project management for local charities, including in the field of drug and alcohol treatment.

== Political career ==
=== Local government ===
Dowding was first elected to Lancaster City Council in 1999 for the Castle Ward (later serving in Dukes ward until 2007). She returned to the council in 2019 as councillor for Marsh ward, where she has been re-elected. She also serves as Deputy Leader of the Green Group on Lancaster City Council.

She has represented Lancaster Central on Lancashire County Council since 2013 and has been re-elected multiple times, most recently in 2025. She is noted for her community campaigning, including involvement in anti-fracking efforts in Lancashire.

In 2003, while a Lancaster Councillor, Dowding was suspended for three months by a standard board tribunal after leaking details of a council deal deferring business rates for British Energy's Heysham nuclear power station. She argued the action was in the public interest as whistleblowing. The Green Party called for changes to the councillor's code of conduct to better protect such disclosures.

=== European Parliament (2019-2020) ===
Dowding was elected as one of the Green Party's MEPs for North West England in the 2019 European Parliament elections. She served from 2 July 2019 until 31 January 2020, when the United Kingdom left the European Union.

During her term, she sat on multiple committees: Committee on Industry, Research and Energy (ITRE), Committee on Transport and Tourism (TRAN), and the Committee on Foreign Affairs (AFET).

She also served on delegations for relations with Israel and Palestine. Her priority areas included climate action, research funding, sustainable travel, and the Israel-Palestine conflict. She produced reports during her tenure, including a Green New Deal for the North West.

== Electoral performance ==
UK Parliament elections
Date of election	Constituency	Party	Votes	% of votes	Result
1992	Lancaster	Green	433	0.9	Not elected
2010	Lancaster and Fleetwood	Green	1,888	4.4	Not elected
2019	Fylde	Green	1,731	3.7	Not elected
2024	Morecambe and Lunesdale	Green	2,089	4.3	Not elected

European Parliament elections
Date of election	Constituency	Party	Votes	% of votes	Result
1999	North West England	Green	56,828	5.6	Not elected
2004	North West England	Green	117,393	5.6	Not elected
2014	North West England	Green	123,075	7.0	Not elected
2019	North West England	Green	216,581	12.5	Elected

Lancashire County Council elections
Date of election	Ward	Party	Votes	% of votes	Result
1993	Lancaster City	Green	758	16.8	Not elected
1997	Lancaster Rural Central	Green	290	4.0	Not elected
2013	Lancaster Central	Green	1,639	38.4	Elected
2017	Lancaster Central	Green	2,206	51.8	Elected
2021	Lancaster Central	Green	2,760	59.8	Elected

Lancaster City Council elections
Date of election	Ward	Party	Votes	% of votes	Result
1991	Castle	Green	886	28.3	Not elected
1995	Castle	Green	912	32.4	Not elected
1999	Castle	Green	1,412	53.8	Elected
2003	Dukes	Green	328	59.0	Elected
2019	Marsh	Green	1,174	71.4	Elected
2023	Marsh	Green	1,241	70.3	Elected
