= Nick Hawkins (politician) =

British politician and barrister (born 1957)

Member of Parliament for Surrey Heath
- In office 1 May 1997 – 11 April 2005
- Preceded by: Constituency established
- Succeeded by: Michael Gove

Member of Parliament for Blackpool South
- In office 9 April 1992 – 8 April 1997
- Preceded by: Peter Blaker
- Succeeded by: Gordon Marsden

Personal details
- Born: 27 March 1957 (age 69)
- Party: Conservative
- Spouse: Jenny Cassar
- Education: Lincoln College, Oxford (MA)

Nicholas John Hawkins (born 27 March 1957) is a barrister and politician from the United Kingdom. He was a Conservative Party Member of Parliament from 1992 to 2005.

== Early life ==
Hawkins was educated at Bedford Modern School and Lincoln College, Oxford, and called to the Bar at the Middle Temple in 1979.

== Parliamentary career ==
Having stood unsuccessfully in Huddersfield in 1987, Hawkins became a Member of Parliament representing the constituency of Blackpool South in 1992. Prior to the 1997 general election, with polls predicting that the Conservatives had no chance of retaining the Blackpool South seat, Hawkins applied and was selected to contest the newly created constituency of Surrey Heath, predicted to be one of the safest Conservative seats in the country. He duly won the seat with a majority 16,287, the second-largest Conservative majority in the country that year (after John Major in Huntingdon). Hawkins was re-elected in 2001 with a reduced majority of 10,819.

Hawkins served in Prime Minister John Major's government in 1995–97, first at the Ministry of Defence and then at the then Department of National Heritage. In opposition, he was appointed and promoted in a series of shadow ministerial jobs by four different Conservative Party leaders. Among other roles, he was Shadow Solicitor General in 2003, a Shadow Home Office Minister on national security issues and drugs policy, Shadow Legal and Constitutional Affairs Minister, and Shadow spokesman on gambling twice (2000–01 and 2003–04).

=== Deselection ===
In April 2004, Hawkins was deselected as the Surrey Heath Conservative Association's parliamentary candidate, following a postal ballot of its 1,200 members in the constituency. His difficulties had begun when he left his wife for a Conservative county councillor in 1999, when a first attempt to deselect him had been defused by Michael Ancram. The decision to drop Hawkins as the Surrey Heath candidate was taken despite appeals on his behalf by Oliver Letwin, William Hague, Ann Widdecombe, and others. The party's leader at the time, Michael Howard, chose not to veto the association's decision.

Hawkins was encouraged by Howard and party co-chairman Liam Fox to stand again for a different constituency, but he decided instead to return to his legal career. He remained a Member of Parliament until the 2005 general election. Michael Gove, a journalist at The Times, was selected as the new Conservative candidate for Surrey Heath in his place, and retained the seat.

== After Parliament ==
After leaving parliament, Hawkins returned to his legal career as a corporate lawyer; he had previously been a barrister on circuit. He had also worked as in-house corporate counsel in banking, insurance, financial services and credit in the 1980s and early 1990s, was elected chairman of the national organisation for corporate barristers, The Bar Association for Commerce, Finance and Industry (BACFI), and elected to serve on the General Council of the Bar (Bar Council) for six years and on its "inner cabinet", the GMC, for two years.

Parliament of the United Kingdom
Preceded by Peter Blaker	Member of Parliament for Blackpool South; 1992–1997	Succeeded by Gordon Marsden
New constituency	Member of Parliament for Surrey Heath; 1997–2005	Succeeded by Michael Gove
