= Andrew Snowden =

British politician (born 1984)

Andrew Snowden MP
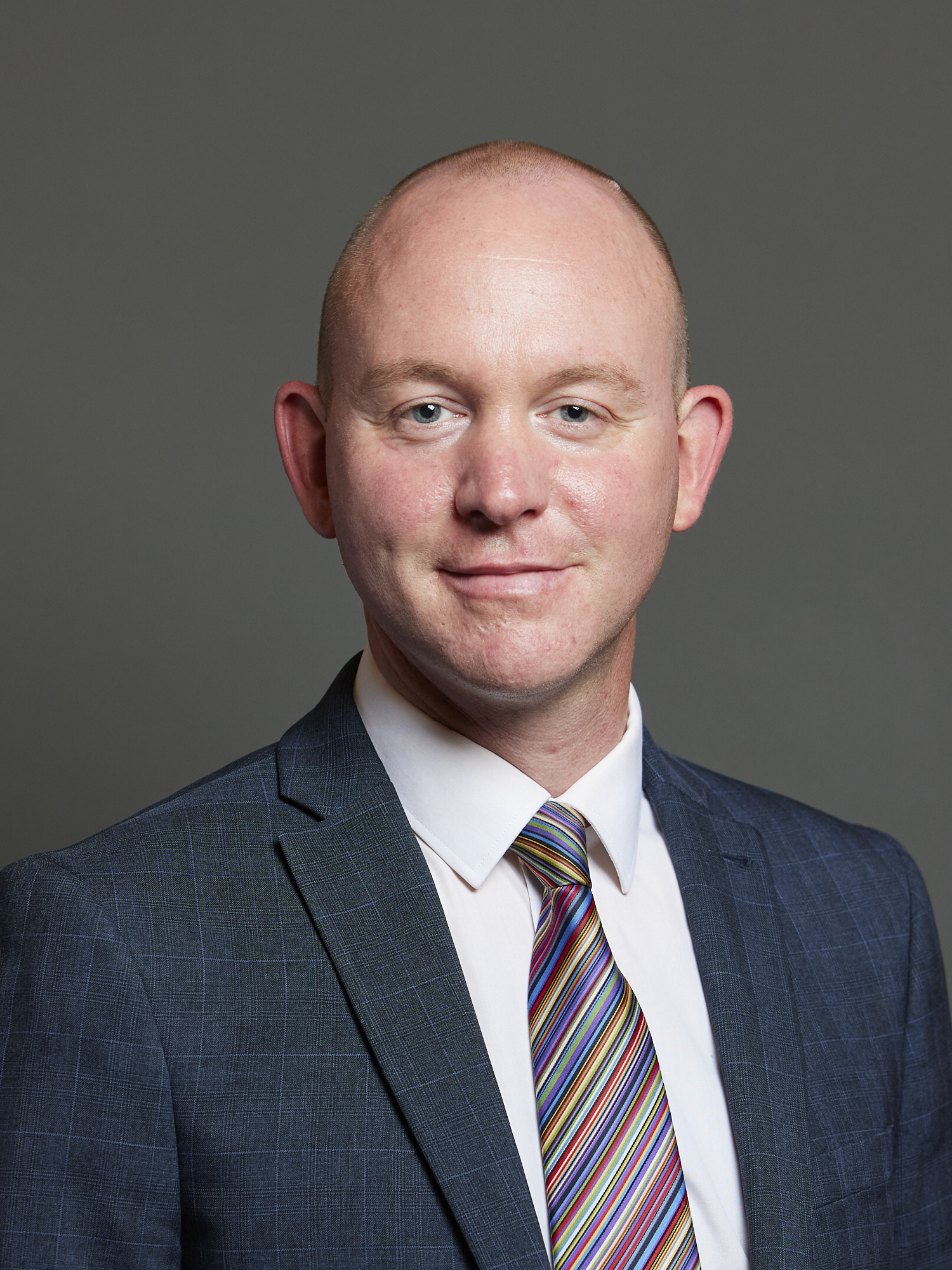
- Official portrait, 2024

Shadow Minister for Work and Pensions
- Incumbent
- Assumed office 2 September 2026
- Leader: Kemi Badenoch
- Preceded by: Danny Kruger (Note: Office vacant between 15 September 2025 and 2 September 2026)

Member of Parliament for Fylde
- Incumbent
- Assumed office 4 July 2024
- Preceded by: Mark Menzies
- Majority: 561 (1.2%)

Lancashire Police and Crime Commissioner
- In office 13 May 2021 – 8 May 2024
- Preceded by: Clive Grunshaw
- Succeeded by: Clive Grunshaw

Lancashire County Councillor for Hoghton with Wheelton
- In office 4 May 2017 – 6 May 2021
- Preceded by: Division created
- Succeeded by: Alan Cullens

Personal details
- Born: Andrew James Snowden; 18 October 1984 (age 41) Bolton, Greater Manchester, England
- Party: Conservative
- Spouse: Caroline Snowden
- Education: Canon Slade School
- Alma mater: University of Salford (BA) Aston University (MSc)
- Website: www.andrewsnowden.uk

Andrew James Snowden (born 18 October 1984) is a British Conservative Party politician elected as Member of Parliament for Fylde at the 2024 general election.

He served as the Lancashire Police and Crime Commissioner from 2021 to 2024.

== Early life and career ==
Snowden was born in Bolton and lives in Fylde. He has a degree in contemporary military and international history (2008) from the University of Salford, where he was president of the students' union in 2006-2007 and 2007-2008.

He returned to the university in 2013 to take up the post of head of the Vice-Chancellor's office, and in 2018 became the associate director of external relations.

== Political career before Parliament ==
Snowden was a member of Lancashire County Council representing Hoghton with Wheelton Division in the borough of Chorley.

He was elected Lancashire Police and Crime Commissioner in the 2021 election held on 6 May. He received 181,314 votes (51.3%), defeating the incumbent, Labour's Clive Grunshaw. He was defeated in turn on 2 May 2024 in the 2024 England and Wales police and crime commissioner elections by Clive Grunshaw.

== Parliamentary career ==
In June 2024, Snowden was selected as the Conservative Parliamentary Candidate for Fylde for the 2024 general election on 4 July 2024; the constituency has been held by the Conservative Party since it was created in 1918. He was elected with a majority of 561 votes.

== Electoral history ==
General election 2024: Fylde
Party	Candidate	Votes	%	±%
Conservative	Andrew Snowden	15,917	33.2	−29.0
Labour	Tom Calver	15,356	32.0	+6.8
Reform	Brook Wimbury	8,295	17.3	N/A
Independent	Anne Aitken	4,513	9.4	N/A
Liberal Democrats	Mark Jewell	2,120	4.4	−2.9
Green	Brenden Wilkinson	1,560	3.3	−0.2
ADF	Cheryl Morrison	199	0.4	N/A
Majority		561	1.2	
Turnout		48,105	62.4	
Conservative hold		Swing	−17.9	

Lancashire Police and Crime Commissioner election, 2024
Party	Candidate	Votes	%	±%
Labour	Clive Grunshaw	135,638	45.56%	+5.28
Conservative	Andrew Snowden	101,281	34.02%	−9.39
Liberal Democrats	Neil Darby	51,252	17.22%	+8.65
Spoilt vote	n/a	9,534	3.20%	+0.15
Turnout		288,171	26.2%	−7.5
Total votes		297,705		
Labour gain from Conservative				

Lancashire Police and Crime Commissioner election, 2021
Party	Candidate	1st round		2nd round			1st round votesTransfer votes, 2nd round
Party	Candidate	Total	Of round	Transfers	Total	Of round	1st round votesTransfer votes, 2nd round
Conservative	Andrew Snowden	166,202	43.41%	15,152	181,354	51.27%	
Labour	Clive Grunshaw	154,195	40.28%	18,167	172,362	48.73%	
Liberal Democrats	Neil Darby	32,813	8.57%				
Reform	Mark James Barker	17,926	4.68%				
Spoilt vote	n/a	11,696	3.05%				
Turnout		371,136	33.7%				
Total votes		382,832					
Conservative gain from Labour							

2017 Lancashire County Council election: Hoghton with Wheelton Division
Party	Candidate	Votes	%
Conservative	Andrew Snowden	1,925	46.5
Labour	Margaret France	1,830	44.2
Liberal Democrats	Stephen Fenn	242	5.8
Green	Gillian Hargreaves	140	3.4
Majority		95	2.3
Turnout		4,143	42.1
Registered electors		9,851	
Conservative win (new seat)			

== Personal life ==
Snowden is married. His wife Caroline has Crohn’s disease and ulcerative colitis, and Snowden has worked through the county council to improve access to toilet facilities for people with these and similar conditions through the "Just Can't Wait" card scheme.

== Notes ==
Civic offices
Preceded by Clive Grunshaw	Lancashire Police and Crime Commissioner; 2021–2024	Succeeded by Clive Grunshaw
Parliament of the United Kingdom
Preceded by Mark Menzies	Member of Parliament for Fylde; 2024–present	Incumbent
