= Lancashire Police and Crime Commissioner =

- Incumbent; Clive Grunshaw since 9 May 2024
- Police and crime commissioner of Lancashire Police
- Reports to: Lancashire Police and Crime Panel
- Appointer: Electorate of Lancashire
- Term length: Four years
- Constituting instrument: Police Reform and Social Responsibility Act 2011
- Precursor: Lancashire Police Authority
- Inaugural holder: Clive Grunshaw
- Formation: 22 November 2012
- Deputy: Deputy Police and Crime Commissioner
- Salary: £88,600
- Website: www.lancashire-pcc.gov.uk

The Lancashire Police and Crime Commissioner is the police and crime commissioner, an elected official tasked with setting out the way crime is tackled by Lancashire Police in the English County of Lancashire. The post was created in November 2012, following an election held on 15 November 2012, and replaced the Lancashire Police Authority.

On 2 May 2024 Clive Grunshaw re-won the post with a 34,357 majority. He was elected with 135,638 votes compared to incumbent Andrew Snowden's 101,281, with a 26.22% turnout. Neil Darby, the Liberal Democrat candidate came third with 51,252 votes. 9,534 ballots were spoiled. Grunshaw had previously held the post from 2012-2021, and was defeated in 2021 by Snowden.

== List of Lancashire Police and Crime Commissioners ==
Name	Political party	From	To
Clive Grunshaw	Labour	22 November 2012	12 May 2021
Andrew Snowden	Conservative	13 May 2021	8 May 2024
Clive Grunshaw	Labour	9 May 2024	Incumbent

== Election results ==
Lancashire Police and Crime Commissioner election, 2024
Party	Candidate	Votes	%	±%
Labour	Clive Grunshaw	135,638	45.56%	+5.28
Conservative	Andrew Snowden	101,281	34.02%	−9.39
Liberal Democrats	Neil Darby	51,252	17.22%	+8.65
Spoilt vote	n/a	9,534	3.20%	+0.15
Turnout		288,171	26.2%	−7.5
Total votes		297,705		
Labour gain from Conservative				

Lancashire Police and Crime Commissioner election, 2021
Party	Candidate	1st round		2nd round			1st round votesTransfer votes, 2nd round
Party	Candidate	Total	Of round	Transfers	Total	Of round	1st round votesTransfer votes, 2nd round
Conservative	Andrew Snowden	166,202	43.41%	15,152	181,354	51.27%	
Labour	Clive Grunshaw	154,195	40.28%	18,167	172,362	48.73%	
Liberal Democrats	Neil Darby	32,813	8.57%				
Reform	Mark James Barker	17,926	4.68%				
Spoilt vote	n/a	11,696	3.05%				
Turnout		371,136	33.7%				
Total votes		382,832					
Conservative gain from Labour							

Lancashire Police and Crime Commissioner election, 2016
Party	Candidate	1st round		2nd round			1st round votesTransfer votes, 2nd round
Party	Candidate	Total	Of round	Transfers	Total	Of round	1st round votesTransfer votes, 2nd round
Labour	Clive Grunshaw	132,261	43.8%	20,453	152,714	56.2%	
Conservative	Andy Pratt	96,746	32.0%	22,195	118,941	43.8%	
UKIP	James Barker	49,987	16.5%				
Liberal Democrats	Graham Roach	23,164	7.7%				
Turnout		302,158	28.1%				
Rejected ballots							
Total votes							
Registered electors							
Labour hold							

Lancashire Police and Crime Commissioner election, 2012
Party	Candidate	1st round		2nd round			1st round votesTransfer votes, 2nd round
Party	Candidate	Total	Of round	Transfers	Total	Of round	1st round votesTransfer votes, 2nd round
Labour	Clive Grunshaw	66,017	39.28%	13,773	79,790	52.1%	
Conservative	Tim Ashton	58,428	34.76%	14,834	73,262	47.9%	
UKIP	Robert Drobny	25,228	15.01%				
Liberal Democrats	Afzal Anwar	18,396	10.95%				
Turnout		168,069	15.05%				
Rejected ballots		4,643	2.69%				
Total votes		172,712	15.47				
Registered electors		1,116,623					
Labour win							
