= Gordon Marsden =

British Labour politician (born 1953)

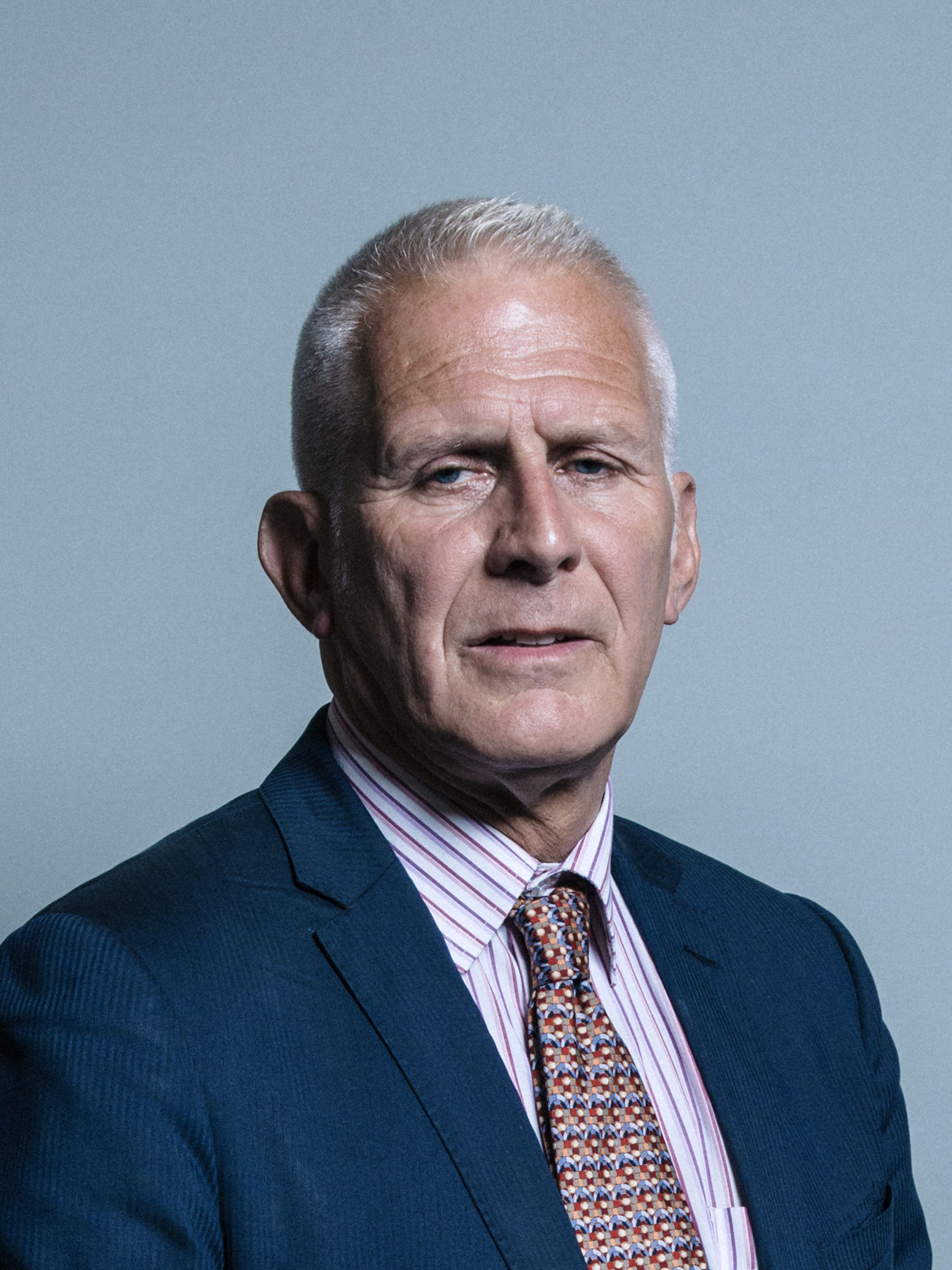
- Official portrait, 2017

Member of Parliament for Blackpool South
- In office 1 May 1997 – 6 November 2019
- Preceded by: Nick Hawkins
- Succeeded by: Scott Benton
Shadow portfolios
2015–2019	Higher Education, Further Education and Skills
2013–2015	Transport
2010–2013	Further Education, Skills and Regional Growth

Personal details
- Born: 28 November 1953 (age 72) Manchester, England
- Party: Labour
- Education: New College, Oxford (MA); Warburg Institute; Harvard University

Gordon Marsden (born 28 November 1953) is a British Labour Party politician who served as member of parliament for Blackpool South from 1997 to 2019.

== Early life ==
Marsden was educated at Stockport Grammar School, an independent school in Stockport, Cheshire, followed by New College, Oxford, where he was awarded a first-class degree in Modern History. He then went on to postgraduate studies at the Warburg Institute (part of the University of London) and Harvard Kennedy School, being a Kennedy Scholar in Politics and International Relations.

Before entering Parliament he had been a tutor for the Open University since 1994, as well as a public affairs adviser to English Heritage and, for twelve years, the editor of History Today and New Socialist magazine.

== Parliamentary career ==
Marsden first contested the seat of Blackpool South in 1992 and won it in 1997. Once elected to Parliament, he served as Parliamentary Private Secretary to Lord Irvine of Lairg in the Lord Chancellor's Department (2001–03), Tessa Jowell as Secretary of State for Culture, Media and Sport (2003–05) and John Denham as Secretary of State for Communities and Local Government and shadow communities secretary (2009–10).

In 2003, he was made a Visiting Parliamentary Fellow of St Antony's College, Oxford.

Marsden sat as a member of the House of Commons Innovation, Universities, Science and Skills Committee and Education and Skills Select Committee, until it was dissolved in 2007.

In May 2010, Marsden was given his first shadow ministerial brief, by acting leader Harriet Harman, as Shadow Minister for Further Education, Skills and Regional Growth. He remained in post following Ed Miliband's election as Labour leader, but was appointed as a Shadow Minister for Transport in the October 2013 Labour frontbench reshuffle.

Gordon Marsden was one of 36 Labour MPs to nominate Jeremy Corbyn as a candidate in the Labour leadership election of 2015.

Following Jeremy Corbyn's election as Labour leader in September 2015, Marsden readopted his former Further Education and Skills briefs as Shadow Minister for Higher Education, Further Education and Skills. In his new position, he succeeded Shadow Universities Minister Liam Byrne and Shadow Further Education and Skills Minister Yvonne Fovargue.

He was Chair of the Associate Parliamentary Skills Group and of the All-Party Parliamentary Group for Veterans.

== Fabian Society ==
Marsden is a member of the Fabian Society, of which he was the chair from 2000 to 2001. He also served as Chair of the Young Fabians and now serves as a Trustee of Dartmouth Street, the building where the society is based.

== Seaside towns ==
Marsden convened the first group of Labour MPs representing seaside and coastal towns. In 2007, Marsden was asked to chair a Manifesto Group for the Prime Minister Gordon Brown on Seaside and Coastal Towns.

== Personal life ==
Marsden is gay. In early 2009, Gordon was named as one of the Daily Telegraph's expenses "saints", due to the low levels of his expenses claims.

Parliament of the United Kingdom
Preceded by Nick Hawkins	Member of Parliament for Blackpool South; 1997–2019	Succeeded by Scott Benton
Party political offices
Preceded by Calum MacDonald	Chair of the Fabian Society; 2000–2001	Succeeded by Denis MacShane
