= Clive Grunshaw =

British politician (born 1961)

Police and Crime Commissioner for Lancashire
- Incumbent
- Assumed office 9 May 2024
- Preceded by: Andrew Snowden
- In office 22 November 2012 – 12 May 2021
- Preceded by: Office established
- Succeeded by: Andrew Snowden

Member of Lancashire County Council for Fleetwood East Marine (1999–2005)
- In office 10 June 1999 – 2 May 2013
- Preceded by: Eddie Fail
- Succeeded by: Ron Shewan

Personal details
- Born: October 1961 (age 65) Fleetwood, Lancashire, England
- Party: Labour
- Education: University of Lancaster (BA, MA)
- Website: Official website

Clive Grunshaw (born October 1961) is a British Labour Party politician who has served as Police and Crime Commissioner for Lancashire since 2024, and previously served from 2012 to 2021.

== Political career ==
Grunshaw was the first person to hold the post of Police and Crime Commissioner for Lancashire and was elected on 15 November 2012 and re-elected in 2016.

Grunshaw, a former milkman, said it was a "new era for policing"; however, he admitted turnout was "disappointing". He was formerly Lancashire County Council member for Fleetwood East and Pharos Ward Councillor for Wyre Council, where he was Leader of a minority Labour Group from May 2007 until resigning from that position on 20 November 2012 on assuming the post of Police and Crime Commissioner. Grunshaw also stood unsuccessfully as the Labour Party candidate for Lancaster and Fleetwood constituency at the 2010 general election.

November 2015 marked three years since the first Police and Crime Commissioner elections. During the year Grunshaw was a prominent campaigner in opposing proposed changes to the way police forces are funded which would have seen Lancashire Constabulary lose £24.5 million. Minister of State for Policing Mike Penning MP was forced to admit to MPs that "a statistical error was made in the data used" and paused the process pending a further review.

== Expenses controversy ==
In December 2012 a Freedom of Information request uncovered information relating to expenses claimed by Clive Grunshaw which has caused some political opponents to demand his resignation. It was alleged that he claimed mileage twice for meetings which took place at the same time, suggesting in one example that he had driven from his Fleetwood home for Preston an hour apart for two separate meetings. In response, Grunshaw said, "At no point have I wilfully submitted claims which I know to be untrue. Clearly there are overlaps in times on some of the claims and this is what is so disappointing. The claims are genuinely intentioned but my process appears to have been flawed."

Following an investigation by the Independent Police Complaints Commission (IPCC) which found that "while errors had been made in expense claims these were due to carelessness rather than any dishonest intent on the part of Mr Grunshaw" the Commissioner criticised the length of time the review took. Mr Grunshaw said "It has taken too long to investigate and the IPCC has taken way too long to publish the report."

== Election results ==
Lancashire Police and Crime Commissioner election, 2024
Party	Candidate	Votes	%	±%
Labour	Clive Grunshaw	135,638	45.56%	+5.28
Conservative	Andrew Snowden	101,281	34.02%	−9.39
Liberal Democrats	Neil Darby	51,252	17.22%	+8.65
Spoilt vote	n/a	9,534	3.20%	+0.15
Turnout		288,171	26.2%	−7.5
Total votes		297,705		
Labour gain from Conservative				

Lancashire Police and Crime Commissioner election, 2021
Party	Candidate	1st round		2nd round			1st round votesTransfer votes, 2nd round
Party	Candidate	Total	Of round	Transfers	Total	Of round	1st round votesTransfer votes, 2nd round
Conservative	Andrew Snowden	166,202	43.41%	15,152	181,354	51.27%	
Labour	Clive Grunshaw	154,195	40.28%	18,167	172,362	48.73%	
Liberal Democrats	Neil Darby	32,813	8.57%				
Reform	Mark James Barker	17,926	4.68%				
Spoilt vote	n/a	11,696	3.05%				
Turnout		371,136	33.7%				
Total votes		382,832					
Conservative gain from Labour							

Lancashire Police and Crime Commissioner election, 2016
Party	Candidate	1st round		2nd round			1st round votesTransfer votes, 2nd round
Party	Candidate	Total	Of round	Transfers	Total	Of round	1st round votesTransfer votes, 2nd round
Labour	Clive Grunshaw	132,261	43.8%	20,453	152,714	56.2%	
Conservative	Andy Pratt	96,746	32.0%	22,195	118,941	43.8%	
UKIP	James Barker	49,987	16.5%				
Liberal Democrats	Graham Roach	23,164	7.7%				
Turnout		302,158	28.1%				
Rejected ballots							
Total votes							
Registered electors							
Labour hold							

Lancashire Police and Crime Commissioner election, 2012
Party	Candidate	1st round		2nd round			1st round votesTransfer votes, 2nd round
Party	Candidate	Total	Of round	Transfers	Total	Of round	1st round votesTransfer votes, 2nd round
Labour	Clive Grunshaw	66,017	39.28%	13,773	79,790	52.1%	
Conservative	Tim Ashton	58,428	34.76%	14,834	73,262	47.9%	
UKIP	Robert Drobny	25,228	15.01%				
Liberal Democrats	Afzal Anwar	18,396	10.95%				
Turnout		168,069	15.05%				
Rejected ballots		4,643	2.69%				
Total votes		172,712	15.47				
Registered electors		1,116,623					
Labour win							

Civic offices
New office	Lancashire Police and Crime Commissioner; 22 November 2012 – 13 May 2021	Succeeded by Andrew Snowden
Preceded by Andrew Snowden	Lancashire Police and Crime Commissioner from 9 May 2024	Incumbent
