= Lancaster City Council elections =

Class of election in the United Kingdom

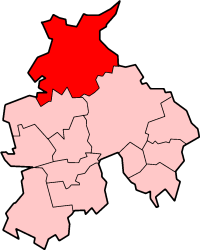
Lancaster shown within the non-metropolitan county of Lancashire (Unitary authorities excluded)

Lancaster City Council elections are held every four years. Lancaster City Council is the local authority for the non-metropolitan district of Lancaster in Lancashire, England. Since the last boundary changes in 2023, 61 councillors have been elected from 27 wards.

== Council elections ==
- 1973 Lancaster City Council election
- 1976 Lancaster City Council election
- 1979 Lancaster City Council election (New ward boundaries)
- 1983 Lancaster City Council election
- 1987 Lancaster City Council election
- 1991 Lancaster City Council election (City boundary changes took place but the number of seats remained the same)
- 1995 Lancaster City Council election
- 1999 Lancaster City Council election
- 2003 Lancaster City Council election (New ward boundaries)
- 2007 Lancaster City Council election
- 2011 Lancaster City Council election
- 2015 Lancaster City Council election (New ward boundaries)
- 2019 Lancaster City Council election
- 2023 Lancaster City Council election (New ward boundaries)

== Election results ==
	Overall control	Labour	Conservative	Liberal/Lib Dems	Green	Independent	Other
2023	NOC	24	5	3	21	7	1
2019	NOC	21	12	14	10	3	-
2015	NOC	29	19	2	9	-	1
2011	NOC	24	16	8	8	-	4
2007	NOC	15	12	11	12	5	5
2003	NOC	20	10	11	7	8	4
1999	NOC	17	8	22	5	6	3
1995	Labour	55	13	10	-	4	-
1991	NOC	24	15	7	-	14	-
1987	NOC	21	28	9	-	2	-
1983	NOC	15	37	6	-	1	1
1979	Conservative	14	37	3	6	-	-
1976	Conservative	11	43	1	5	-	-
1973	Conservative	17	34	1	-	4	3

== Results maps ==
2003 results map

2007 results map

2011 results map

2015 results map

2019 results map

2023 results map

== By-elections ==
=== 1995–1999 ===
Torrisholme By-Election 5 December 1996
Party	Candidate	Votes	%	±%
Labour		538	34.7	
Conservative		460	29.6	
Liberal Democrats		348	22.4	
Morecambe Bay Independents		206	13.3	
Majority		78	5.1	
Turnout		1,552	42.8	
Labour gain from Liberal Democrats		Swing		

Ellel By-Election 24 July 1997
Party	Candidate	Votes	%	±%
Labour		366	38.6	+0.8
Independent		321	33.9	+33.9
Conservative		261	27.5	−15.0
Majority		45	4.7	
Turnout		948	27.6	
Labour gain from Conservative		Swing		

Alexandra By-Election 9 October 1997
Party	Candidate	Votes	%	±%
Labour	Peter Robinson	389	48.4	−25.3
Conservative		161	20.0	+20.0
Morecambe Bay Independent		142	17.7	+17.7
Independent		77	9.6	+9.6
Independent		30	3.7	−22.6
Green		5	0.6	+0.6
Majority		228	28.4	
Turnout		804		
Labour hold		Swing		

Arkholme By-Election 9 October 1997
Party	Candidate	Votes	%	±%
Conservative	James Irey	421	81.0	+15.0
Labour		99	19.0	+19.0
Majority		322	62.0	
Turnout		520		
Conservative hold		Swing		

Skerton West By-Election 9 October 1997
Party	Candidate	Votes	%	±%
Labour	John Harrison	427	46.9	−26.8
Morecambe Bay Independents		285	31.1	+31.3
Conservative		198	21.8	−4.5
Majority		142	15.8	
Turnout		910		
Labour hold		Swing		

Hornby By-Election 30 April 1998
Party	Candidate	Votes	%	±%
Conservative	Clive Lamb	451	53.6	+5.0
Liberal Democrats	Henry Humphreys	261	31.0	−0.8
Labour	Kevin Dixon	80	9.5	−10.0
Independent	John Greathead	50	5.9	+5.9
Majority		190	22.6	
Turnout		842	54.1	
Conservative hold		Swing		

Parks By-Election 30 April 1998
Party	Candidate	Votes	%	±%
Independent	John Fretwell	845	65.6	+40.7
Conservative	David Le Bas	274	21.3	−12.9
Labour	Leslie Houghton	106	8.2	−13.4
Liberal Democrats	Majorie Buck	64	4.9	−14.3
Majority		571	44.3	
Turnout		1,289	36.8	
Independent gain from Conservative		Swing		

=== 1999–2003 ===
John O'Gaunt By-Election 28 September 2000
Party	Candidate	Votes	%	±%
Liberal Democrats	Liz Scott	424	25.5	+5.2
Labour	Richard Newman-Thompson	395	23.8	−14.6
Independent	Sheila Kavanagh	340	20.5	+12.0
Conservative	Chris Reich	291	17.5	+0.4
Green	Peter Gordon	212	12.8	−2.9
Majority		29	1.7	
Turnout		1,662	27.0	
Liberal Democrats gain from Labour		Swing		

=== 2003–2007 ===
Overton By-Election 7 August 2003
Party	Candidate	Votes	%	±%
Independent	Garry Baxter	269	37.2	+9.9
Independent	Susan Ayrey	197	27.2	+27.2
Morecambe Bay Independents	Barbara Williams	120	16.6	−24.7
Labour	Darren Clifford	69	9.5	+9.5
Conservative	John Battersby-Hill	55	7.6	−19.6
Liberal Democrats	Terence Taylor	14	1.9	+1.9
Majority		72	10.0	
Turnout		724	38.0	
Independent gain from Independent		Swing		

Heysham South By-Election 26 February 2004
Party	Candidate	Votes	%	±%
Conservative	Kenneth Brown	499	36.1	+36.1
Labour	Darren Clifford	493	35.6	−0.1
England First Party	Paul Bamford	191	13.8	+13.8
Morecambe Bay Independents	Christopher Greenall	143	10.3	−39.5
Liberal Democrats	Terence Taylor	37	2.7	+2.7
Green	Ashley Toms	20	1.4	−13.0
Majority		6	0.5	
Turnout		1,383	27.7	
Conservative gain from Independent		Swing		

Carnforth By-Election 11 March 2004
Party	Candidate	Votes	%	±%
Labour	Judith Newton	353	48.5	+14.9
Conservative	David Wood	207	28.4	+11.4
Independent	Robert Roe	168	23.1	−3.2
Majority		146	20.1	
Turnout		728	21.8	
Labour hold		Swing		

John O'Gaunt By-Election 5 May 2005
Party	Candidate	Votes	%	±%
Labour	Margaret Chadwick	1,282	40.7	−2.3
Liberal Democrats	Philip Dunster	1,115	35.4	+18.0
Conservative	Sheila Parkinson	750	23.8	+0.0
Majority		167	5.3	
Turnout		3,147		
Labour hold		Swing		

John O'Gaunt By-Election 8 December 2005
Party	Candidate	Votes	%	±%
Labour	James Blakely	466	38.0	−2.7
Liberal Democrats	Philip Dunster	287	23.4	−12.0
Green	Matthew Wootton	247	20.1	+20.1
Conservative	William Hill	226	18.4	−5.4
Majority		179	14.6	
Turnout		1,226	23.9	
Labour hold		Swing		

Skerton West By-Election 22 June 2006
Party	Candidate	Votes	%	±%
Labour	Robert Smith	826	59.8	+16.8
Conservative	Debbie Buck	336	24.3	+4.9
BNP	Christopher Hill	220	15.9	+15.9
Majority		490	35.5	
Turnout		1,382	31.2	
Labour hold		Swing		

Skerton West By-Election 14 December 2006
Party	Candidate	Votes	%	±%
Labour	Karen Leytham	493	59.1	+16.1
Conservative	John Airey	172	20.6	+1.2
BNP	Christopher Hill	93	11.2	+11.2
Independent	Norman Gardner	76	9.1	−8.2
Majority		321	38.5	
Turnout		834	17.4	
Labour hold		Swing		

=== 2007–2011 ===
Castle By-Election 4 June 2009
Party	Candidate	Votes	%	±%
Green	Melanie Forrest	1,191	53.5	−4.9
Conservative	Billy Hill	442	19.9	+5.9
Labour	Richard Newman-Thompson	369	16.6	+0.2
Liberal Democrats	Rebecca Parris	223	10.0	+2.2
Majority		749	33.6	
Turnout		2,225		
Green hold		Swing		

John O'Gaunt By-Election 1 April 2010
Party	Candidate	Votes	%	±%
Labour	Elizabeth Scott	603	35.2	−4.9
Liberal Democrats	Harry Arrmistead	389	22.7	+22.7
Green	Ian Chamberlain	339	19.8	−17.5
Conservative	Billy Hill	301	17.6	−5.1
UKIP	Fred McGlade	83	4.8	+4.8
Majority		214	12.5	
Turnout		1,715	29.8	
Labour hold		Swing		

Scotforth West By-Election 22 May 2014
Party	Candidate	Votes	%	±%
Green	Abi Mills	823	36.24	
Labour	Colin Hartley	802	35.31	
Conservative	Janet Walton	339	22.77	
Liberal Democrats	Philip Dunster	80	3.52	
TUSC	Steve Metcalfe	49	2.25	
Majority		21	12.5	
Turnout				
Green gain from Labour		Swing		

University By-Election 22 May 2014
Party	Candidate	Votes	%	±%
Green	Jack Filmore	273	39.28	
Labour	James Leyshon	237	34.10	
Conservative	Daniel Aldred	128	18.42	
Liberal Democrats	Oliver Mountjoy	33	4.75	
Independent	Stuart Langhorn	24	3.45	
Majority		46	6.62	
Turnout		695		
Green gain from Labour		Swing		

=== 2015–2019 ===
Carnforth and Millhead by-election 5 May 2016
Party	Candidate	Votes	%	±%
Labour	John Reynolds	702	43.1	8.0
Conservative	John Bassinder	671	41.2	−6.8
UKIP	Robert Wilson Gillespie	134	8.2	N/A
Liberal Democrats	Phil Dunster	74	4.5	N/A
Green	Cait Sinclair	49	3.0	−13.9
Majority		31	1.9	
Turnout		695		
Labour gain from Conservative		Swing		

Westgate by-election 13 October 2016
Party	Candidate	Votes	%	±%
Labour	Ian Clift	443	41.6	9.1
MB Independent	Roger Dennison	193	18.1	0.4
UKIP	Michelle Ogden	183	17.2	−7.5
Conservative	Daniel Gibbins	178	16.7	−8.3
Liberal Democrats	Louise Stansfield	41	3.9	3.9
Green	Richard Moriarty	26	2.4	2.4
Majority		250	1.9	
Turnout		695	23.5	
Labour hold		Swing		

University and Scotforth Rural by-election 8 December 2016
Party	Candidate	Votes	%	±%
Labour	Nathan Burns	98	34.9	−0.5
Green	Xeina Aveyard	79	28.1	−4.4
Conservative	Luke Brandon	68	24.2	0.5
Liberal Democrats	Pippa Hepworth	36	12.8	4.4
Majority		19	6.8	
Turnout		282	7.1	
Labour hold		Swing		

Labour Cllr Karen Leytham (Skerton West) resigned in July 2017. A by-election was held:

Skerton West by-election, 7 Sep 2017
Party	Candidate	Votes	%	±%
Labour	Hilda Jean Parr	512	61	
Conservative	Andy Kay	288	35	
Liberal Democrats	Derek John Kaye	33	4	
Turnout		833	16	
Labour hold				

Independent Cllr Paul Woodruff (Halton-with-Aughton) resigned in July 2017. A by-election was held:

Halton-with-Aughton by-election, 28 Sep 2017
Party	Candidate	Votes	%	±%
Labour	Kevin Frea	247	27	
Green	Jan Maskell	245	27	
Conservative	Daniel Scott Gibbins	236	26	
Liberal Democrats	Catherine Pilling	174	19	
Turnout		902	43	
Labour gain from Independent				

Labour Cllr Roger Sherlock (Skerton West) died in November 2017. A by-election was held:

Skerton West by-election, 17 May 2018
Party	Candidate	Votes	%	±%
Labour	Peter Rivet	587	57.8	+20.8
Conservative	Andy Kay	279	27.1	+1.2
Liberal Democrats	Derek John Kaye	95	9.4	+9.4
Green	Cait Sinclair	59	5.8	−3.7
Majority				
Turnout		1020		
Labour hold				

University and Scotforth Rural ward Labour councillors Sam Armstrong (elected Green) and Lucy Atkinson retired in March 2018. A double by-election was held.

University and Scotforth Rural by-election 17 May 2018
Party	Candidate	Votes	%	±%
Labour	Amara Betts-Patel	518	25.37	
Labour	Oliver Robinson	423	20.72	
Green	Martin Paley	264	12.93	
Green	Jan Maskell	235	11.51	
Conservative	Callum Furner	184	9.01	
Conservative	Guy F.P Watts	184	9.01	
Liberal Democrats	Jade Sullivan	120	5.88	
Liberal Democrats	Iain Emberry	114	5.58	
Turnout		1033	27.01	+19.89
Labour gain from Green				
Labour hold				

=== 2019–2023 ===
Conservative councillor Michael Smith (Overton), who is partially deaf resigned in November 2019 because he was "struggling to hear" in meetings. A by-election was held the next month, on the same day as the 2019 United Kingdom general election.

Overton by-election 12 December 2019
Party	Candidate	Votes	%	±%
Conservative	Andrew Gardiner	650	52	6
Labour	Tom Porter	527	42	0
Liberal Democrats	Amy Stanning	65	5	N/A
Turnout		1242	67	
Conservative hold				

In June 2020, Liberal Democrat councillor Michael Mumford (Kellet) died. Due to the COVID-19 pandemic, no council by-elections will take place in the UK until May 2021 at the earliest.

Kellet by-election 6 May 2021
Party	Candidate	Votes	%	±%
Conservative	Stuart Morris	447	51	6
Liberal Democrats	Ross Hunter	271	31	−14
Independent	Kathryn Atkins	161	18	N/A
Turnout		879		
Conservative gain from Liberal Democrats				

Bulk by-election 6 May 2021
Party	Candidate	Votes	%	±%
Green	Jack Lenox	1283	54	
Labour	Anna Lee	824	35	
Conservative	Matthew Maxwell-Scott	209	9	
Liberal Democrats	Katia Adimora	45	2	
Turnout		2361		
Green hold				

Jack O'Dwyer-Henry, Eco-Socialist Independent (elected Labour) councillor for the University and Scotforth Rural ward, resigned from the council, triggering a by-election in the ward.

University and Scotforth Rural by-election, 11 November 2021
Party	Candidate	Votes	%	±%
Labour	Fabiha Askari	216	46.1	▲5.0
Green	Jamie Payne	193	41.2	▲11.0
Conservative	Matthew Maxwell-Scott	44	9.4	▼7.2
Liberal Democrats	Zanna Ashton	16	3.4	▼8.8
Majority		23	4.9	
Turnout		469	13.4	
Labour hold		Swing		

Carnforth and Millhead by-election, 25 November 2021
Party	Candidate	Votes	%	±%
Labour	Luke Taylor	538	57.7	+20.4
Conservative	Stuart Bateson	315	33.8	+1.5
Green	Patrick McMurray	54	5.8	−5.1
Liberal Democrats	Tony Saville	25	2.7	+2.7
Majority		223	23.9	
Turnout		932		
Labour hold		Swing		

Bare by-election, 2 December 2021
Party	Candidate	Votes	%	±%
Liberal Democrats	Gerry Blaikie	428	33.1	+21.9
Green	James Sommerville	301	23.3	+16.2
MB Independent	June Ashworth	243	18.8	−14.1
Conservative	Jane Cottam	215	16.6	−12.1
Labour	Valerie Rogerson	107	8.3	−7.9
Majority		127	9.8	
Turnout		1,294		
Liberal Democrats gain from Conservative		Swing		

Upper Lune Valley by-election, 2 December 2021
Party	Candidate	Votes	%	±%
Liberal Democrats	Ross Hunter	390	63.1	+19.1
Conservative	Iain Harbison	183	29.6	−16.3
Green	Nicky Sharkey	24	3.9	+3.9
Labour	Faith Kenrick	21	3.4	−6.7
Majority		207	33.5	
Turnout		618		
Liberal Democrats gain from Conservative		Swing		

Ellel by-election, 19 May 2022
Party	Candidate	Votes	%	±%
Green	Sally Maddocks	547	39.7	+19.5
Labour	Lisa Corkerry	418	30.4	−1.1
Conservative	Janet Walton	377	27.4	−14.3
Liberal Democrats	Robert Fildes	35	2.5	−4.0
Majority		129	9.4	
Turnout		1,377		
Green gain from Conservative		Swing		

Harbour by-election, 21 July 2022
Party	Candidate	Votes	%	±%
Labour	Margaret Pattison	555	47.9	+3.8
Liberal Democrats	Jake Perkins	479	41.4	+41.4
Conservative	Colin Hewitt	124	10.7	−1.6
Majority		76	6.6	
Turnout		1,158		
Labour hold		Swing		

Warton by-election, 8 September 2022
Party	Candidate	Votes	%	±%
Green	Sue Tyldesley	452	65.7	+32.8
Conservative	Iain Harbison	169	24.6	−22.6
Labour	Faith Kenrick	44	6.4	+13.4
Liberal Democrats	Jane Parsons	23	3.3	+3.3
Majority		283	41.1	
Turnout		688		
Green gain from Conservative		Swing		

=== 2023–2027 ===
Green Party councillor Shelagh McGregor (Castle) resigned in January 2024.

Castle by-election 14 March 2024
Party	Candidate	Votes	%	±%
Green	Izzy Metcalf-Riener	524	65.0	
Labour	Emily Jones	212	26.3	
Conservative	Daniel Kirk	43	5.3	
Liberal Democrats	Cormac Evans	27	3.3	
Majority		312	38.7	
Turnout		806		
Green hold		Swing		

Labour councillor Paul Gardner (Carnforth and Millhead) died in December 2023.

Carnforth and Millhead by-election 2 May 2024
Party	Candidate	Votes	%	±%
Labour	Jackson Stubbs	644	47.3	
Conservative	Peter Yates	454	33.4	
Green	Emily Heath	194	14.3	
Liberal Democrats	Lynda Dagdeviren	69	5.1	
Majority		190	14.0	
Turnout		1,361		
Labour hold		Swing		

Labour councillor Erin Hall (University) resigned in May 2024.

University by-election 4 July 2024
Party	Candidate	Votes	%	±%
Green	Maria Deery	96	45.1	
Labour	Anya Wilkinson-Leishman	83	39.0	
Conservative	Matthew Maxwell-Scott	23	10.8	
Liberal Democrats	Thomas Willis	11	5.2	
Majority		13	6.1	
Turnout		213	5.9	
Green gain from Labour		Swing		

Green Party councillor Grace Russell (John O'Gaunt) resigned in March 2025.

John O'Gaunt by-election 1 May 2025
Party	Candidate	Votes	%	±%
Green	Wilson Colley	523	55.2	
Labour	Dave McGrath Wilkinson	277	29.2	
Liberal Democrats	Ethan Weir-Preston	133	14.0	
Reform	Martyn Sutton	15	1.6	
Majority		246	25.9	
Turnout		948		
Green hold		Swing		

Green Party councillor Izzy Metcalf-Riener (Castle) resigned in April 2026.

Castle by-election 21 May 2026
Party	Candidate	Votes	%	±%
Green	Will Farley	845	70.0	+5.0
Labour	William Evans	190	15.7	−10.3
Reform	Marco Wright	132	10.9	+10.9
Liberal Democrats	Malcolm Martin	41	3.4	+0.1
Majority		655	54.2	
Turnout		1,208		
Green hold		Swing		
