= 2011 Lancaster City Council election =

Council election in Lancaster, Lancashire

Elections to Lancaster City Council were held on 5 May 2011. Lancaster City Council is a secondary-level district council in Lancashire. The whole council was up for election and, following the result, remains in No Overall Control.

The Local Government Boundary Commission for England reviewed the electoral wards of Lancaster City Council in 2014 with the new electoral map to be elected for the first time at the 2015 Lancaster City Council election.

Following the election in 2011 the composition of the council was as follows:

Party	Seats	±
Labour	24	+11
Conservative	16	+5
Green	8	-4
Morecambe Bay Independents	8	-3
Independent	4	-4
Liberal Democrat	0	-5

== Election results ==
Lancaster City Council Election, 2011
Party	Seats	Gains	Losses	Net gain/loss	Seats %	Votes %	Votes	+/−
Labour	24	11	0	+11	41.38	32.92	28,711	+7.01
Conservative	16	5	0	+5	25.86	26.28	22,920	-3.68
Green	8	0	4	-4	13.79	15.98	13,932	-2.49
MB Independent	8	1	6	-4	13.79	13.68	11,927	+0.89
Independent	4	1	1	±0	6.90	5.69	4,965	+1.71
Liberal Democrats	0	0	5	-5	0.00	5.45	4,752	-2.53

== Ward results ==
=== Bare Ward ===
Bare (2 councillors)
Party	Candidate	Votes	%	±%
MB Independent	June Irene Ashworth*	847	31.85	+13.32
MB Independent	Tony Anderson*	752	28.28	+13.39
Conservative	Susan Elisabeth Bray	621	23.35	+2.87
Conservative	Alison Bernadette Tyson	439	16.51	−0.44
Turnout				
MB Independent hold		Swing	+6.93	
MB Independent gain from Conservative		Swing	+10.52	

=== Bolton-Le-Sands ward ===
Bolton-Le-Sands (2 councillors)
Party	Candidate	Votes	%	±%
Independent	Keith Budden*	958	48.60	+20.70
Conservative	Val Histed*	713	36.17	+9.73
Green	Sue Holden	300	15.22	+6.06
Turnout				
Independent hold		Swing	+22.87	
Conservative hold		Swing	+5.63	

=== Bulk ward ===
Bulk (3 councillors)
Party	Candidate	Votes	%	±%
Green	Tim Hamilton-Cox	900	16.24	−3.28
Green	Ceri Mumford	881	15.89	−1.20
Green	Andrew Kay*	875	15.79	−1.18
Labour	Bob Clark	804	14.50	+0.52
Labour	Sue Clark	789	14.23	+1.06
Labour	Aidan Williams	654	11.80	+0.59
Conservative	Claire Paula Dunn	219	3.95	−0.18
Conservative	Howard Byers	218	3.93	−0.01
Conservative	James Jenkins-Yates	203	3.66	+3.66
Turnout				
Green hold		Swing	-3.80	
Green hold		Swing	-2.36	
Green hold		Swing	-1.77	

=== Carnforth ward ===
Carnforth (2 councillors)
Party	Candidate	Votes	%	±%
Conservative	Tony Johnson*	543	23.03	−4.82
Labour	Paul Malcolm Gardener	515	21.84	+3.86
Conservative	Chris Leadbetter	448	19.00	+19.00
Labour	Fran Hanna	418	17.73	−1.19
Independent	Bob Roe*	360	15.27	−7.26
Independent	Amanda Louise Davies	74	3.14	+3.14
Turnout				
Conservative hold		Swing	-3.63	
Labour gain from Independent		Swing	+7.39	

=== Castle ward ===
Castle (3 councillors)
Party	Candidate	Votes	%	±%
Green	Jon Barry*	1,492	23.31	−0.03
Green	Melanie Forrest*	1,204	18.81	−1.05
Green	Tracey Kennedy	1,142	17.84	−0.77
Labour	James Groves	589	9.20	+2.65
Labour	Peter Rivet	585	9.14	+2.98
Labour	Joe Wright	512	8.00	+2.11
Conservative	Kyle Patterson	366	5.72	+0.13
Conservative	Natalia Karolina Anastacia Weglarz	247	3.86	−1.17
Liberal Democrats	Paul Hardingham Bramhall	117	1.83	−1.31
Liberal Democrats	Rebecca Joan Parris	108	1.69	+1.69
Conservative	Aaron Spence	38	0.60	−3.80
Turnout				
Green hold		Swing	-2.68	
Green hold		Swing	-4.13	
Green hold		Swing	-2.88	

=== Dukes ward ===
Dukes (1 councillor)
Party	Candidate	Votes	%	±%
Green	Dave Brookes	385	45.51	−21.51
Labour	Michael John Gibson	283	33.45	+13.59
Conservative	Richard Sykes	125	14.78	−3.66
Liberal Democrats	Stephen Maxwell	53	6.26	+6.26
Majority		102	12.06	−29.78
Turnout		846		
Green hold		Swing	-35.10	

=== Ellel ward ===
Ellel (2 councillors)
Party	Candidate	Votes	%	±%
Conservative	Helen Helme*	1,110	28.54	−4.49
Conservative	Susie Charles*	1,009	25.94	−4.36
Labour	Jane Binnion	609	15.66	+6.23
Labour	David Hill	562	14.45	+6.25
Green	Rebecca Marsden	261	6.71	−2.69
Liberal Democrats	Paul Hindley	174	4.47	−5.16
Liberal Democrats	Anabelle Lyons	164	4.22	−5.18
Turnout				
Conservative hold		Swing	-10.52	
Conservative hold		Swing	-9.38	

=== Halton-with-Aughton ward ===
Halton-with-Aughton (1 councillor)
Party	Candidate	Votes	%	±%
Independent	Paul Woodruff*	795	85.67	+30.74
Green	Cat Gilles	133	14.33	+8.55
Majority		662	71.34	+55.71
Turnout		928		
Independent hold		Swing	+55.70	

=== Harbour ward ===
Harbour (3 councillors)
Party	Candidate	Votes	%	±%
Labour	Janice Hanson*	688	20.21	+6.08
Labour	David Whittaker	599	17.59	+5.03
Labour	Ian Pattison	579	17.00	+3.91
MB Independent	Geoff Walker*	434	12.75	−0.68
MB Independent	Terry Ingle	365	10.72	−1.60
MB Independent	Rita Margaret Walker	348	10.22	−1.19
Conservative	Elliot Layfield	295	8.66	+0.79
Green	Christopher John Hart	97	2.85	+0.48
Turnout				
Labour hold		Swing	+5.65	
Labour gain from MB Independent		Swing	+7.74	
Labour hold		Swing	+5.10	

=== Heysham Central ward ===
Heysham Central (2 councillors)
Party	Candidate	Votes	%	±%
Independent	Joyce Taylor*	633	31.68	−4.06
MB Independent	Geoff Knight*	599	29.98	+6.27
Labour	Dilys Greenhalgh	438	21.92	+5.73
Independent	Pat Hibbins	226	11.31	−7.45
Green	Rosemary Susan Jennifer Betterton	102	5.11	−0.49
Independent hold		Swing	-7.22	
MB Independent hold		Swing	+11.15	
Turnout				

=== Heysham North ward ===
Heysham North (2 councillors)
Party	Candidate	Votes	%	±%
Labour	Margaret Pattison	504	27.13	+7.65
Labour	Ron Sands*	464	24.97	+4.72
MB Independent	Nicholas Baxter	352	18.95	+1.68
MB Independent	Geoffrey Wilson	266	14.32	−2.90
Independent	Peter Robinson	202	10.87	+10.87
Green	Matthew James Wilson	70	3.77	−1.69
Turnout				
Labour hold		Swing	+5.92	
Labour hold		Swing	+7.67	

=== Heysham South ward ===
Heysham South (3 councillors)
Party	Candidate	Votes	%	±%
Conservative	Emma Louise Smith	740	16.74	−5.77
MB Independent	Mike Greenall*	'715	16.18	−2.35
Conservative	Richard William Rollins	626	14.16	+14.16
MB Independent	Kyra Physick	606	13.71	+0.55
Labour	Charlotte Louise Pattison	530	11.99	−0.24
Labour	Stephen Charles Wheeler	525	11.88	+0.35
MB Independent	Keran Farrow*	514	11.63	−2.06
Green	Charalampos Kaloudis	154	3.48	+3.48
Turnout				
Conservative hold		Swing	-6.32	
MB Independent hold		Swing	-2.21	
Conservative gain from MB Independent		Swing	+15.86	

=== John O'Gaunt ward ===
John O'Gaunt (3 councillors)
Party	Candidate	Votes	%	±%
Labour	Eileen Blamire*	1,131	17.60	+3.73
Labour	Elizabeth Scott	1,085	16.88	+2.09
Labour	Richard Newman-Thompson	931	14.49	+2.90
Green	Caroline Jackson	731	11.38	−2.38
Green	Nicky Sharkey	522	8.12	−4.17
Conservative	Wes Cosgriff	467	7.27	−1.08
Green	Dan Tierney	419	6.52	−3.71
Conservative	Mary Elizabeth Holloway	407	6.33	−1.62
Conservative	Ally Whittam	303	4.72	−2.46
Liberal Democrats	Gareth Allan Baker	202	3.14	+3.14
Liberal Democrats	Lyndz Pitchford	130	2.02	+2.02
Liberal Democrats	Ashley Samson	98	1.53	+1.53
Turnout				
Labour hold		Swing	+2.58	
Labour hold		Swing	+6.26	
Labour gain from Green		Swing	+9.39	

=== Kellet ward ===
Kellet (1 councillor)
Party	Candidate	Votes	%	±%
Conservative	John Roger Mace*	708	76.79	−2.29
Labour	Lawrence James Bradwell	148	16.05	+6.15
Green	Dave Horton	66	7.16	−3.86
Majority		560	60.74	−7.31
Turnout		922		
Conservative hold		Swing	-7.32	

=== Lower Lune Valley ward ===
Lower Lune Valley (2 councillors)
Party	Candidate	Votes	%	±%
Conservative	Joan Parkinson Jackson	929	24.99	+3.43
Conservative	Jane Parkinson	800	21.52	+2.19
Liberal Democrats	Stuart Langhorn*	672	18.08	−4.98
Liberal Democrats	Joyce Pritchard*	650	17.49	−4.72
Labour	Charlotte Hill	263	7.08	+3.74
Labour	Becky Hodgson	242	6.51	+3.88
Green	Mark Miles Wescombe	161	4.33	+0.57
Turnout				
Conservative gain from Liberal Democrats		Swing	+7.56	
Conservative gain from Liberal Democrats		Swing	+7.76	

=== Overton ward ===
Overton (1 councillor)
Party	Candidate	Votes	%	±%
Independent	Keith Sowden*	485	67.17	+29.85
Labour	Alan Biddulph	237	32.82	+9.02
Majority		248	34.35	+30.27
Turnout		722		
Independent hold		Swing	+30.27	

=== Poulton ward ===
Poulton (3 councillors)
Party	Candidate	Votes	%	±%
MB Independent	Shirley Burns*	562	13.40	−2.23
Labour	Mark Bevan	538	12.83	+0.93
Labour	Terrie Metcalfe	514	12.26	+2.59
Labour	Darren Keith Clifford	506	12.07	+3.28
Independent	Evelyn Archer*	490	11.69	+3.94
MB Independent	Tricia Heath	446	10.64	−4.99
MB Independent	Linda Page	395	9.42	−1.69
Independent	David Lord	273	6.51	+6.51
Conservative	David Tyson	271	6.46	−2.30
Conservative	Paul Kutschmarski	198	4.72	−4.00
Turnout				
MB Independent hold		Swing	-4.63	
Labour gain from MB Independent		Swing	+7.10	
Labour hold		Swing	+0.83	

=== Scotforth East ward ===
Scotforth East (2 councillors)
Party	Candidate	Votes	%	±%
Labour	Pam Pickles	647	19.49	+9.24
Conservative	Billy Hill	571	17.20	+1.27
Labour	Jean Taylor	570	17.17	+8.13
Conservative	Janet Walton	506	15.25	+0.21
Liberal Democrats	Janie Kirkham*	402	12.11	−10.65
Liberal Democrats	Phil Dunster	289	8.71	−12.33
Green	Emily Heath	185	5.57	+5.57
Green	Abi Mills	149	4.49	−1.44
Turnout				
Labour gain from Liberal Democrats		Swing	+16.75	
Conservative gain from Liberal Democrats		Swing	+5.14	

=== Scotforth West ward ===
Scotforth West (3 councillors)
Party	Candidate	Votes	%	±%
Labour	Sheila Denwood*	1,157	16.85	+2.91
Green	Chris Coates	794	11.56	−5.03
Labour	Josh Bancroft	788	11.48	+3.07
Labour	Colin Hartley	766	11.16	+3.26
Green	Zoe Jones	687	10.01	−2.84
Conservative	Becca Rollinson	571	8.32	−1.92
Conservative	James Calder	570	8.30	−1.29
Green	Andy Yuille	533	7.76	−3.29
Conservative	Matthew Sinclair	490	7.14	−1.27
Liberal Democrats	John William Allen	229	3.34	+3.34
Independent	Robert Alan Chard	142	2.07	+2.07
Liberal Democrats	Arthur Henry Livesley	139	2.02	+2.02
Turnout				
Labour hold		Swing	+3.95	
Green hold		Swing	-5.95	
Labour gain from Green		Swing	+7.60	

=== Silverdale ward ===
Silverdale (1 councillor)
Party	Candidate	Votes	%	±%
Conservative	Kathleen Valerie Graham	678	63.13	−9.88
Green	Amanda Faith Bingley	215	20.02	+3.10
Labour	Ruth Warren	181	16.85	+6.79
Majority		463	43.11	−12.97
Turnout		1074		
Conservative hold		Swing	-12.98	

=== Skerton East ward ===
Skerton East (3 councillors)
Party	Candidate	Votes	%	±%
Labour	Janet Tracy Hall	816	24.46	+7.58
Labour	Robert Michael Redfern*	791	23.71	+8.89
Labour	Abbott Bryning*	787	23.59	+8.47
Conservative	Stuart James Alexander Bateson	383	11.48	+3.07
Independent	Mick Varey	327	9.80	+3.05
Liberal Democrats	Richard Giles Gonard	232	6.95	+6.95
Turnout				
Labour hold		Swing	+4.51	
Labour hold		Swing	+6.96	
Labour hold		Swing	+9.76	

=== Skerton West ward ===
Skerton West (3 councillors)
Party	Candidate	Votes	%	±%
Labour	Karen Leytham*	859	28.04	+3.69
Labour	John Harrison	829	27.06	+4.94
Labour	Roger Sherlock*	584	19.06	−3.06
Conservative	Graham Charles Agnew	457	14.92	+3.10
Green	Keri Melinda Alston	335	10.93	+1.71
Turnout				
Labour hold		Swing	+0.59	
Labour hold		Swing	+4.65	
Labour hold		Swing	-2.17	

=== Slyne-with-Hest ward ===
Slyne-with-Hest (2 councillors)
Party	Candidate	Votes	%	±%
Conservative	Sylvia Rogerson*	1,121	35.86	−3.74
Conservative	Malcolm Thomas*	1,065	34.07	−5.12
Labour	Suzi Dunning	429	13.72	+3.53
Labour	Cari Wood	321	10.27	+10.27
Green	Barry Gwyn Hankin	190	6.08	−4.93
Turnout				
Conservative hold		Swing	-6.45	
Conservative hold		Swing	-5.20	

=== Torrisholme ward ===
Torrisholme (3 councillors)
Party	Candidate	Votes	%	±%
MB Independent	Roger Dennison*	811	13.49	+2.30
MB Independent	Geoff Marsland*	750	12.48	+2.11
Conservative	Susan Gail Sykes	737	12.26	+2.87
Conservative	Dorothy Mingins	680	11.31	+1.74
MB Independent	Brian Binfield	671	11.16	+0.98
Labour	Jon-Paul Blundell	607	10.10	+4.59
Conservative	John Wild	557	9.27	+0.24
Liberal Democrats	Ian Clift	352	5.86	−3.53
Liberal Democrats	Michael Gradwell	342	5.69	+8.42
Liberal Democrats	Bill Jackson	274	4.56	−3.13
Green	Catriona Stamp	230	3.83	+0.28
Turnout				
MB Independent hold		Swing	+0.38	
MB Independent hold		Swing	+1.40	
Conservative gain from Liberal Democrats		Swing	+10.33	

=== University ward ===
University (2 councillors)
Party	Candidate	Votes	%	±%
Labour	Paul Aitchison	369	27.43	+16.72
Labour	Jonathan Dixon	314	23.35	+14.39
Green	Ian McCulloch*	170	12.64	−6.27
Green	Rick Seymour	152	11.30	−5.20
Conservative	Jordan Thomas Shandley	113	8.40	−2.20
Conservative	Samuel Vince Thurgood	102	7.58	−1.82
Liberal Democrats	Myles Anthony Clapham	67	4.98	−7.15
Liberal Democrats	Leo Mead	58	4.31	−7.27
Turnout				
Labour gain from Green		Swing	+22.99	
Labour gain from Green		Swing	+19.59	

=== Upper Lune Valley ward ===
Upper Lune Valley (1 councillor)
Party	Candidate	Votes	%	±%
Conservative	Peter Thomas Williamson*	829	74.95	−3.75
Green	Gisela Christine Renolds	277	25.05	+3.75
Majority		552	49.91	−7.49
Turnout		1106		
Conservative hold		Swing	-7.50	

=== Warton ward ===
Warton (1 councillor)
Party	Candidate	Votes	%	±%
Conservative	Alycia James	465	50.54	+10.06
Labour	Janette Gardner	335	36.41	+36.41
Green	Mike Wright	120	13.04	+13.04
Majority		130	14.13	+33.22
Turnout		920		
Conservative gain from Independent		Swing	+33.21	

=== Westgate ward ===
Westgate (3 councillors)
Party	Candidate	Votes	%	±%
MB Independent	David Kerr*	676	16.24	+1.16
Labour	Vikki Price	660	15.86	+6.46
Labour	David Smith	659	15.83	+6.77
MB Independent	Roger Henry Plumb*	609	14.63	+0.56
MB Independent	Anthony Michael Bernard Wade*	576	13.84	−0.60
Conservative	Leo Croombs	352	8.46	+1.75
Conservative	John Geoff Marsden	320	7.69	+1.44
Conservative	Michael Donald Huet	310	7.45	+1.40
Turnout				
MB Independent hold		Swing	+2.10	
Labour gain from MB Independent		Swing	+6.27	
Labour gain from MB Independent		Swing	+13.15	
