= 1995 Lancaster City Council election =

Local election in Lancaster, England

- 4 May 1995

All 60 seats to Lancaster City Council 31 seats needed for a majority
	First party	Second party	Third party
Party	Labour	Conservative	MB Independent
Seats before	23	15
Seats won	33	13	10
Seat change	▲10	▼2
Popular vote	45,544	15,964
	Fourth party	Fifth party
Party	Liberal Democrats	Independents
Seats before	7
Seats won	4
Seat change	▼3
Popular vote	10,584

The 1995 Lancaster City Council election took place on 4 May 1995 to elect members of Lancaster City Council in Lancashire, England. This was on the same day as other local elections in England.

== Summary ==
=== Election result ===
1995 Lancaster City Council
Party	Candidates	Seats	Gains	Losses	Net gain/loss	Seats %	Votes %	Votes	+/−
MB Independent		10				36.6			
Labour	55	33	10		▲10			45,544	
Conservative	34	13	1	3	▼2			15,964	
Liberal Democrats	15	4	0	3	▼3			10,584	
Independent	0								

== Ward Results ==
=== Alexandra ===
Alexandra (3 seats)
Party	Candidate	Votes	%	±%
Labour	Smith G. Ms.*	1,055	25.7	
Labour	Beckingham D.*	982	24.0	
Labour	Trevor Tattersall	963	23.5	
Independent	Wilson M.	377	9.2	
Independent	Toulmin H.	364	8.9	
Independent	Wilson-Taylor F.	357	8.7	
Turnout		4,098		
Labour hold				
Labour gain from Independent				
Labour hold				

=== Arkholme ===
Arkholme (1 seat)
Party	Candidate	Votes	%	±%
Conservative	Kirkby V. Ms.*	386	66.0	
Liberal Democrats	Anthony Saville	199	34.0	
Turnout		585	45.1	
Conservative hold				

=== Bolton-Le-Sands ===
Bolton-Le-Sands (2 seats)
Party	Candidate	Votes	%	±%
Independent	Keith Budden	739	29.3	
Conservative	Arthur Briggs*	524	20.8	
Labour	Robinson D.	431	17.1	
Liberal Democrats	Mellor P.	424	16.8	
Conservative	Parkes G.*	404	16.0	
Turnout		2,522	43.5	
Independent gain from Conservative				
Conservative hold				

=== Bulk ===
Bulk (3 seats)
Party	Candidate	Votes	%	±%
Labour	Ian Barker*	1,957	28.8	
Labour	Abbott Bryning*	1,916	28.2	
Labour	Jean Elizabeth Yates*	1,765	26.0	
Liberal Democrats	Gee A.	251	3.7	
Green	Kembery H. Ms.	229	3.4	
Liberal Democrats	Livesley C. Ms.	207	3.0	
Conservative	Taylor E. Ms.	175	2.6	
Green	McQuillan L. Ms.	158	2.3	
Green	McQuillan M.	130	1.9	
Turnout		6,788	46.3	
Labour hold				
Labour hold				
Labour hold				

=== Carnforth ===
Carnforth (2 seats)
Party	Candidate	Votes	%	±%
Labour	Edna Jones*	952	35.1	
Labour	Morgan M. Ms.*	826	30.5	
Independent	Bond K.	606	22.4	
Independent	Turner F.	326	12.0	
Turnout		2,710	36.4	
Labour hold				
Labour hold				

=== Castle ===
Castle (3 seats)
Party	Candidate	Votes	%	±%
Labour	Stanley Henig*	1,539	20.1	
Labour	Rye P.*	1,530	20.0	
Labour	Sutton J.*	1,518	19.8	
Green	Gina Dowding	912	11.9	
Green	Jon Barry	653	8.5	
Green	Marshall G.	567	7.4	
Conservative	Rickels A.	315	4.1	
Conservative	Birdi J.	311	4.1	
Conservative	Shapland K. Ms.	307	4.0	
Turnout		7,652	46.1	
Labour hold				
Labour hold				
Labour hold				

=== Caton ===
Caton (2 seats)
Party	Candidate	Votes	%	±%
Liberal Democrats	Patricia Quinton*	952	31.3	
Liberal Democrats	Gorst H. Ms.*	937	30.8	
Conservative	Joan Jackson	502	16.5	
Conservative	Michael Jackson	460	15.1	
Labour	Thomas Penney	194	6.4	
Turnout		3,045	56.3	
Liberal Democrats hold				
Liberal Democrats hold				

=== Ellel ===
Ellel (2 seats)
Party	Candidate	Votes	%	±%
Conservative	Helen Helme	613	21.4	
Conservative	Huddleston E. Ms.*	602	21.0	
Labour	William Glaister	545	19.0	
Labour	Glaister D. Ms.	544	19.0	
Liberal Democrats	Hewer W.	284	9.9	
Liberal Democrats	Gilbert P. Ms.	278	9.7	
Turnout		2,866	47.3	
Conservative hold				
Conservative hold				

=== Halton-With-Aughton ===
Halton-With-Aughton (1 seat)
Party	Candidate	Votes	%	±%
Independent	Paul Woodruff	413	43.9	
Conservative	Towers H.*	355	37.8	
Labour	Waterhouse I.	172	18.3	
Turnout		940	51.1	
Independent gain from Conservative				

=== Harbour ===
Harbour (2 seats)
Party	Candidate	Votes	%	±%
Labour	Stanley D.*	1,003	31.1	
Labour	Bush E. Ms.	872	27.0	
Independent	Neale A.	487	15.1	
Independent	Neale M. Ms.	418	13.0	
Conservative	Ken Brown	271	8.4	
Independent Labour	Woods I. Ms.	176	5.5	
Turnout		3,227	43.0	
Labour hold				
Labour gain from Independent				

=== Heysham Central ===
Heysham Central (2 seats)
Party	Candidate	Votes	%	±%
Independent	Joyce Taylor*	1,014	39.0	
Independent	Geoffrey Knight	757	29.1	
Labour	Mackenzie J.	375	14.4	
Conservative	Briggs-Allen F.*	300	11.5	
Independent	Greenham C.	155	6.0	
Turnout		2,601	49.8	
Independent hold				
Independent gain from Conservative				

=== Heysham North ===
Heysham North (2 seats)
Party	Candidate	Votes	%	±%
Labour	Janice Hanson	526	22.1	
MB Independent	Mavis Newton*	510	21.4	
Labour	Fletcher M. Ms.	490	20.6	
Independent	Bird A.	456	19.2	
Independent	Pearson B.*	396	16.7	
Turnout		2,378	42.6	
Labour gain from Independent				
Independent hold				

=== Heysham South ===
Heysham South (3 seats)
Party	Candidate	Votes	%	±%
Labour	Roberts A.	1,345	19.6	
Labour	Albert Hayden Thornton	1,281	18.7	
Labour	Thompson R.	1,250	18.2	
Independent	Morris P.	880	12.8	
Independent	Morris L.*	833	12.2	
Independent	Stones E. Ms.	805	11.7	
Conservative	Michael Donald Huett	420	6.1	
Independent	Walne D.	40	0.6	
Turnout		6,854		
Labour gain from Independent				
Labour gain from Independent				
Labour gain from Independent				

=== Hornby ===
Hornby (1 seat)
Party	Candidate	Votes	%	±%
Conservative	Hannah G.*	376	48.6	
Liberal Democrats	McCreesh J.	246	31.8	
Labour	Shaw J. Ms.	151	19.5	
Turnout		773	51.3	
Conservative hold				

=== John O'Gaunt ===
John O'Gaunt (3 seats)
Party	Candidate	Votes	%	±%
Labour	Patrick Kavanagh*	1,749	25.2	
Labour	Newman R. Ms.	1,586	22.9	
Labour	Mary Blamire*	1,540	22.2	
Liberal Democrats	Basaj E. Ms.	483	7.0	
Conservative	Theobald K.	400	5.8	
Conservative	Thompson W. Ms.	380	5.5	
Green	Ainsworth A.	288	4.2	
Green	Toms A.	260	3.8	
Green	Deacon W. Ms.	242	3.5	
Turnout		6,928	42.5	
Labour hold				
Labour hold				
Labour hold				

=== Kellet ===
Kellet (1 seat)
Party	Candidate	Votes	%	±%
Conservative	Shuttleworth H. Ms.*	430	64.6	
Labour	Robin G.	236	35.4	
Turnout		666	44.4	
Conservative hold				

=== Overton ===
Overton (1 seat)
Party	Candidate	Votes	%	±%
Independent	Rainford M. Ms.*	580	65.2	
Conservative	Williams B. Ms.	309	34.8	
Turnout		889	35.7	
Independent hold				

=== Parks ===
Parks (2 seats)
Party	Candidate	Votes	%	±%
Conservative	Roberts A.	606	22.4	
Conservative	Race J. Ms.*	579	21.4	
MB Independent	June Ashworth*	442	16.3	
Labour	Houghton L.	383	14.1	
Independent	Haigh P. Ms.	357	13.2	
Liberal Democrats	Blackwell J.	341	12.6	
Turnout		2,708	47.8	
Conservative gain from Independent				
Conservative hold				

=== Poulton ===
Poulton (3 seats)
Party	Candidate	Votes	%	±%
MB Independent	Patricia Heath*	580	16.3	
Conservative	Shirley Burns*	576	16.2	
Labour	Terrie Metcalfe	554	15.6	
MB Independent	Evelyn Archer*	504	14.2	
Independent	O'Brien N. Ms.	500	14.1	
Independent	Crookall A.	403	11.3	
Independent	Evans M.	312	8.8	
Green	Edward T.	122	3.4	
Turnout		3,551	35.0	
MB Independent hold				
Conservative hold				
Labour gain from MB Independent				

=== Scotforth East ===
Scotforth East (3 seats)
Party	Candidate	Votes	%	±%
Labour	Eileen Blamire	1,296	16.9	
Labour	Robert Clark*	1,233	16.1	
Labour	Kay A.	1,182	15.4	
Independent	Janie Kirkman	988	12.9	
Liberal Democrats	John Gilbert*	933	12.2	
Liberal Democrats	Bird D. Ms.	906	11.8	
Conservative	Cowperthwaite R.	377	4.9	
Independent	Niven M. Ms.	377	4.9	
Independent	Rigby R.	364	4.8	
Turnout		7,656	40.1	
Labour gain from Liberal Democrats				
Labour gain from Liberal Democrats				
Labour gain from Liberal Democrats				

=== Scotforth West ===
Scotforth West (3 seats)
Party	Candidate	Votes	%	±%
Labour	Sheila Denwood	1,255	20.8	
Labour	Fearnley J.*	1,105	18.3	
Labour	Rogers C.	1,083	18.0	
Conservative	Sykes D.	574	9.5	
Conservative	Cumpsty A.	561	9.3	
Independent	Shingler T.	560	9.3	
Liberal Democrats	Gardner D. Ms.	310	5.1	
Green	Power A. Ms.	306	5.1	
Liberal Democrats	Hewer C. Ms.	272	4.5	
Turnout		6,026	45.5	
Labour hold				
Labour hold				
Labour hold				

=== Silverdale ===
Silverdale (1 seat)
Party	Candidate	Votes	%	±%
Liberal Democrats	Greenwell J. Ms.	580	57.9	
Conservative	Butterworth M. Ms.*	422	42.1	
Turnout		1,002	58.1	
Liberal Democrats hold				

=== Skerton Central ===
Skerton Central (2 seats)
Party	Candidate	Votes	%	±%
Labour	Janet Horner*	1,078	45.4	
Labour	Charles Grattan*	1,060	44.6	
Conservative	Hirst R.	170	7.2	
Green	Prall G.	68	2.9	
Turnout		2,376	41.4	
Labour hold				
Labour hold				

=== Skerton East ===
Skerton East (2 seats)
Party	Candidate	Votes	%	±%
Labour	Lodge J.*	879	37.6	
Labour	Orriss L.*	854	36.5	
Conservative	Val Outram	248	10.6	
Liberal Democrats	Mitchell D.	244	10.4	
Green	Langford W. Ms.	114	4.9	
Turnout		2,339	43.7	
Labour hold				
Labour hold				

=== Skerton West ===
Skerton West (2 seats)
Party	Candidate	Votes	%	±%
Labour	Dawson T.*	1,244	33.4	
Labour	Broad C. Ms.	1,135	30.5	
Conservative	Taylor J. Ms.*	819	22.0	
Liberal Democrats	Mick Varey	375	10.1	
Green	Jones T.	146	3.9	
Turnout		3,719	58.3	
Labour hold				
Labour hold				

=== Slyne-With-Hest ===
Slyne-With-Hest (2 seats)
Party	Candidate	Votes	%	±%
Conservative	Rostron S. Ms.*	812	35.5	
Conservative	Wilcox F.*	707	30.9	
Liberal Democrats	Acres I. Ms.	530	23.2	
Green	Clark S. Ms.	239	10.4	
Turnout		2,288	52.8	
Conservative hold				
Conservative hold				

=== Torrisholme ===
Torrisholme (2 seats)
Party	Candidate	Votes	%	±%
Liberal Democrats	Kay A. Ms.	785	19.0	
Conservative	Deighton B.*	685	16.6	
Conservative	England L.	644	15.6	
Liberal Democrats	Barker B.	629	15.2	
Independent	Webster W.	580	14.0	
Independent	Herron A.	517	12.5	
Labour	Thomas Penney	297	7.2	
Turnout		4,137	59.6	
Liberal Democrats hold				
Conservative hold				

=== Victoria ===
Victoria (3 seats)
Party	Candidate	Votes	%	±%
MB Independent	Geoffrey Wilson*	1,781	27.2	
MB Independent	Baxter N.	1,578	24.1	
MB Independent	Mark Turner	1,565	23.9	
Labour	Lucas B.	555	8.5	
Labour	Hurst S.	535	8.2	
Labour	Trevor Tattersall	523	8.0	
Turnout		6,537	52.4	
Independent hold				
Independent hold				
Independent hold				

=== Warton ===
Warton (1 seat)
Party	Candidate	Votes	%	±%
Conservative	Wood D.*	610	57.4	
Liberal Democrats	Holmes B. Ms.	418	39.4	
Green	Harrison D.	34	3.2	
Turnout		1,062	56.9	
Conservative hold				
