= 1991 Lancaster City Council election =

Election

- 2 May 1991

All 60 seats to Lancaster City Council 31 seats needed for a majority

	First party	Second party	Third party
Party	Conservative	Labour	Liberal Democrats
Last election	28 seats	21 seats	9 seats
Seats won	15	24	7
Seat change	▼13	▲3	▼2
	Fourth party
Party	Independent
Last election	2 seats
Seats won	14
Seat change	▲12
Leader before election
Conservative
No overall control
Leader after election
Labour
No overall control

The 1991 Lancaster City Council election took place on 2 May 1991. This was on the same day as other local elections in England. The election resulted in no overall control of the council.

== Election result ==
1973 Lancaster City Council
Party	Candidates	Seats	Gains	Losses	Net gain/loss	Seats %	Votes %	Votes	+/−
Labour		24	6	3	▲2				
Conservative		15	1	14	▼13				
Independent		14	12	0	▲12				
Liberal Democrats		7	1	3	▼2				

== Ward Results ==
=== Alexandra ===
Alexandra (3 seats)
Party	Candidate	Votes	%	±%
Labour	G. Smith Ms.	757	38.3	
Independent	M. Wilson	693	35.1	
Labour	D. Beckingham	685		
Independent	G. Shippey	680		
Labour	A. Kay	655		
Conservative	M. Woodhouse Ms.	527	26.7	
Turnout		3,997	41.2	
Labour hold				
Independent gain from Conservative				
Labour hold				

=== Arkholme ===
Arkholme (1 seat)
Party	Candidate	Votes	%	±%
Conservative	V. Fidler Ms.	Unopposed		
Turnout		0	0.0	
Conservative hold				

=== Bolton-Le-Sands ===
Bolton-Le-Sands (2 seats)
Party	Candidate	Votes	%	±%
Conservative	Arthur Briggs	986	45.2	
Conservative	G. Parkes	855		
Independent	B. Ford Ms.	798	36.6	
Labour	C. Robinson	399	18.3	
Labour	M. Swarbrick	350		
Turnout		3,388	55.7	
Conservative hold				
Conservative hold				

=== Bulk ===
Bulk (3 seats)
Party	Candidate	Votes	%	±%
Labour	I. Barker	1,941	71.5	
Labour	A. Bryning	1,856		
Labour	J. Yates Ms.	1,818		
Liberal Democrats	A. Gee	474	17.5	
Liberal Democrats	D. Bracey	463		
Liberal Democrats	C. Livesley Ms.	433		
Green	J. Fisher	301	11.1	
Turnout		6,286	50.1	
Labour hold				
Labour hold				
Labour hold				

=== Carnforth ===
Carnforth (2 seats)
Party	Candidate	Votes	%	±%
Labour	E. Jones Ms.	991	57.9	
Labour	M. Morgan Ms.	791		
Conservative	K. Bond	722	42.1	
Conservative	G. Birkett	636		
Turnout		3,140	43.0	
Labour gain from Conservative				
Labour hold				

=== Castle ===
Castle (3 seats)
Party	Candidate	Votes	%	±%
Labour	P. Rye	1,491	47.7	
Labour	J. Sutton	1,490		
Labour	S. Henig	1,456		
Green	G. Dowding Ms.	886	28.3	
Liberal Democrats	C. Hewer Ms.	750	24.0	
Liberal Democrats	T. Barney	703		
Liberal Democrats	S. Luscombe	568		
Turnout		6,344	50.0	
Labour hold				
Labour hold				
Labour hold				

=== Caton ===
Caton (2 seats)
Party	Candidate	Votes	%	±%
Liberal Democrats	S. Mews	1,007	53.6	
Liberal Democrats	P. Quinton Ms.	858		
Conservative	J. Jackson Ms.	671	35.7	
Labour	R. Hill	201	10.7	
Turnout		2,737	58.0	
Liberal Democrats hold				
Liberal Democrats hold				

=== Ellel ===
Ellel (2 seats)
Party	Candidate	Votes	%	±%
Conservative	R. Carr	848	44.9	
Conservative	E. Huddleston Ms.	751		
Labour	R. Snell	596	31.6	
Liberal Democrats	P. Gilbert Ms.	444	23.5	
Turnout		2,639	51.0	
Conservative hold				
Conservative hold				

=== Halton-With-Aughton ===
Halton-With-Aughton (1 seat)
Party	Candidate	Votes	%	±%
Conservative	H. Towers	387	39.1	
Independent	P. Woodruff	301	30.4	
Liberal Democrats	K. Fenton	253	25.6	
Green	P. Smith	49	4.9	
Turnout		990	53.7	
Conservative hold				

=== Harbour ===
Harbour (2 seats)
Party	Candidate	Votes	%	±%
Labour	D. Stanley	998	37.2	
Independent	J. Harrison	854	31.8	
Conservative	D. Jackson	834	31.0	
Labour	L. Anderson	776		
Independent	I. Woods Ms.	474		
Turnout		3,936	54.8	
Labour hold				
Independent gain from Conservative				

=== Heysham Central ===
Heysham Central (2 seats)
Party	Candidate	Votes	%	±%
MB Independent	Joyce Taylor	1,248	64.3	
Conservative	F. Briggs-Allen	693	35.7	
Independent	G. Fowlestone	547		
Turnout		2,488	52.7	
MB Independent hold				
Conservative hold				

=== Heysham North ===
Heysham North (2 seats)
Party	Candidate	Votes	%	±%
MB Independent	Mavis Newton	1,019	57.4	
MB Independent	B. Pearson	758		
Labour	K. Brown	455	25.6	
Conservative	J. Tedbury	301	17.0	
Turnout		2,533	40.6	
MB Independent gain from Liberal Democrats				
MB Independent gain from Liberal Democrats				

=== Heysham South ===
Heysham South (3 seats)
Party	Candidate	Votes	%	±%
Independent	P. Morris	1,344	40.7	
Independent	I. Bradley	1,270		
Labour	G. Gare-Simmons	1,027	31.1	
Labour	J. Hanson Ms.	982		
Conservative	P. Whitworth	934	28.3	
Conservative	D. Rayner	896		
Conservative	J. Rawnsley	829		
Turnout		6,282	51.8	
Independent hold				
Independent gain from Conservative				
Labour gain from Conservative				

=== Hornby ===
Hornby (1 seat)
Party	Candidate	Votes	%	±%
Conservative	G. Hannah	583	72.6	
Labour	M. Wright	144	17.9	
Green	G. Marshall	76	9.5	
Turnout		803	54.7	
Conservative hold				

=== John O'Gaunt ===
John O'Gaunt (3 seats)
Party	Candidate	Votes	%	±%
Labour	M. Blamire Ms.	1,489	51.9	
Labour	P. Kavanagh	1,431		
Labour	A. Whitfield	1,293		
Liberal Democrats	D. Bird Ms.	959	33.4	
Liberal Democrats	D. Ashbridge	925		
Liberal Democrats	M. Mumford	900		
Green	A. Toms	423	14.7	
Turnout		6,420	49.2	
Labour hold				
Labour hold				
Labour hold				

=== Kellet ===
Kellet (1 seat)
Party	Candidate	Votes	%	±%
Conservative	H. Shuttleworth Ms.	Unopposed		
Turnout		0	0.0	
Conservative hold				

=== Overton ===
Overton (1 seat)
Party	Candidate	Votes	%	±%
Independent	M. Rainford Ms.	700	70.4	
Conservative	J. Downey	294	29.6	
Turnout		994	49.0	
Independent gain from Conservative				

=== Parks ===
Parks (2 seats)
Party	Candidate	Votes	%	±%
MB Independent	June Ashworth	888	44.6	
Conservative	J. Race Ms.	861	43.2	
Conservative	P. Lewis	826		
Independent	G. Harrison Ms.	766		
Labour	G. Robin	242	12.2	
Turnout		3,583	52.9	
Independent gain from Conservative				
Conservative hold				

=== Poulton ===
Poulton (3 seats)
Party	Candidate	Votes	%	±%
MB Independent	Patricia Heath	907	41.1	
MB Independent	Evelyn Archer	848		
Conservative	S. Burns Ms.	688	31.1	
Labour	T. Metcalfe Ms.	614	27.8	
Conservative	W. Thornton	541		
Turnout		3,598	40.6	
Independent gain from Conservative				
Independent gain from Conservative				
Conservative hold				

=== Scotforth East ===
Scotforth East (3 seats)
Party	Candidate	Votes	%	±%
Liberal Democrats	J. Gilbert	1,563	49.8	
Liberal Democrats	J. Kirkman Ms.	1,556		
Liberal Democrats	R. Taylor	1,334		
Labour	I. Waterhouse	1,031	32.8	
Labour	D. Brooksbank Ms.	1,021		
Labour	J. Burke Ms.	986		
Green	J. Barry	547	17.4	
Turnout		7,038	50.2	
Liberal Democrats hold				
Liberal Democrats hold				
Liberal Democrats hold				

=== Scotforth West ===
Scotforth West (3 seats)
Party	Candidate	Votes	%	±%
Labour	R. Clark	992	32.8	
Labour	C. Rogers	940		
Labour	J. Fearnley	924		
Independent	T. Shingler	718	23.8	
Conservative	J. Ball	701	23.2	
Conservative	D. Sykes	696		
Independent	J. Pacula	663		
Conservative	T. Hindle	598		
Liberal Democrats	P. Brannigan	336	11.1	
Green	C. Williams Ms.	274	9.1	
Turnout		6,842	53.5	
Labour gain from Conservative				
Labour gain from Conservative				
Labour gain from Conservative				

=== Silverdale ===
Silverdale (1 seat)
Party	Candidate	Votes	%	±%
Liberal Democrats	J. Greenwell Ms.	580	57.9	
Conservative	M. Butterworth Ms.	422	42.1	
Turnout		1,002	58.1	
Liberal Democrats gain from Conservative				

=== Skerton Central ===
Skerton Central (2 seats)
Party	Candidate	Votes	%	±%
Labour	D. Henderson Ms.	1,070	70.3	
Labour	J. Horner Ms.	1,034		
Liberal Democrats	H. Morgan	258	17.0	
Green	A. Power Ms.	194	12.7	
Turnout		2,556	43.7	
Labour hold				
Labour hold				

=== Skerton East ===
Skerton East (2 seats)
Party	Candidate	Votes	%	±%
Labour	J. Lodge	879	59.2	
Labour	L. Orriss	854		
Conservative	V. Outram Ms.	248	16.7	
Liberal Democrats	D. Mitchell	244	16.4	
Green	W. Langford Ms.	114	7.7	
Turnout		2,339	43.7	
Labour hold				
Labour hold				

=== Skerton West ===
Skerton West (2 seats)
Party	Candidate	Votes	%	±%
Labour	T. Dawson	1,244	48.1	
Labour	C. Broad Ms.	1,135		
Conservative	J. Taylor Ms.	819	31.7	
Liberal Democrats	M. Varey	375	14.5	
Green	T. Jones	146	5.7	
Turnout		3,719	58.3	
Labour gain from Conservative				
Labour hold				

=== Slyne-With-Hest ===
Slyne-With-Hest (2 seats)
Party	Candidate	Votes	%	±%
Conservative	S. Rostron Ms.	812	51.4	
Conservative	F. Wilcox	707		
Liberal Democrats	I. Acres Ms.	530	33.5	
Green	S. Clark Ms.	239	15.1	
Turnout		2,288	52.8	
Conservative hold				
Conservative hold				

=== Torrisholme ===
Torrisholme (2 seats)
Party	Candidate	Votes	%	±%
Liberal Democrats	A. Kay Ms.	785	33.4	
Conservative	B. Deighton	685	29.2	
Conservative	L. England	644		
Liberal Democrats	B. Barker	629		
Independent	W. Webster	580	24.7	
Independent	A. Herron	517		
Labour	T. Penney	297	12.7	
Turnout		4,137	59.6	
Liberal Democrats hold				
Conservative gain from Liberal Democrats				

=== Victoria ===
Victoria (3 seats)
Party	Candidate	Votes	%	±%
MB Independent	Geoffrey Wilson	1,781	76.2	
MB Independent	N. Baxter	1,578		
MB Independent	Mark Turner	1,565		
Labour	B. Lucas	555	23.8	
Labour	S. Hurst	535		
Labour	T. Tattersall	523		
Turnout		6,537	52.4	
MB Independent gain from Labour				
MB Independent gain from Labour				
MB Independent gain from Labour				

=== Warton ===
Warton (1 seat)
Party	Candidate	Votes	%	±%
Conservative	D. Wood	610	57.4	
Liberal Democrats	B. Holmes Ms.	418	39.4	
Green	D. Harrison	34	3.2	
Turnout		1,062	56.9	
Conservative hold				
