= 2019 Lancaster City Council election =

- 5 May 2019

All 60 seats to Lancaster City Council 31 seats needed for a majority

	First party	Second party	Third party
Party	Labour	MB Independent	Conservative
Last election	29 seats, 36.7%	2 seats, 6.6%	19 seats, 28.7%
Seats won	21	14	12
Seat change	▼8	▲12	▼7
Popular vote	27,581	10,580	19,937
Percentage	33.7%	12.9%	24.4%
Swing	▼3.0%	▲6.3%	▼4.3%
	Fourth party	Fifth party
Party	Green	Liberal Democrats
Last election	9 seats, 17.8%	0 seats, 3.0%
Seats won	10	3
Seat change	▲1	▲3
Popular vote	17,865	4,914
Percentage	21.8%	6.0%
Swing	▲4.0%	▲3.0%
- Map showing the results of the 2019 Lancaster City Council election
Council control before election
No overall control
Council control after election
No overall control

Elections to Lancaster City Council were held on 2 May 2019 at the same time as other 2019 United Kingdom local elections. Local elections are held every four years with all councillors up for election in multi-member electoral wards.

== Council composition ==
Prior to the election the composition of the council was:

↓
31	15	7	2	5
Lab	Con	G	MBI	I

The 2015 election returned no overall control, but a series of defections and by-election wins have maintained a majority for the Labour Party afterwards. The composition of the Council immediately after the last election was:

↓
29	19	9	2	1
Lab	Con	G	MBI	I

Following the 2019 election, the council was returned with No Overall Control.

↓
21	14	12	10	3
Lab	MBI	Con	G	LD

== Election results ==
Lancaster City Council election result, 2019
Party	Candidates						Votes		
Party	Stood	Elected	Gained	Unseated	Net	% of total	%	No.	Net %
Labour	60	21	3	11	▼8	35.0	33.7	27,581	–3.0
MB Independent	20	14	12	0	▲12	23.3	12.9	10,580	+6.3
Conservative	60	12	0	7	▼7	20.0	24.4	19,937	–4.3
Green	35	10	2	1	▲1	16.7	21.8	17,865	+4.0
Liberal Democrats	22	3	3	0	▲3	5.0	6.0	4,914	+3.0
Independent	2	0	0	1	▼1	0.0	1.0	783	–2.1
UKIP	1	0	0	0	Steady	0.0	0.2	190	–3.9

== Ward results ==
=== Bare ===
Bare (3 seats)
Party	Candidate	Votes	%	±%
MB Independent	Tony Anderson	827	38.1	
MB Independent	Sarah Knight	800	36.8	
Conservative	Stephie Barber	721	33.2	
Conservative	Charles Edwards	708	32.6	
Conservative	Stuart Morris	598	27.5	
MB Independent	Paula Ross-Clasper	597	27.5	
Labour	Callum Henry	406	18.7	
Labour	Becca Snow	396	18.2	
Liberal Democrats	Owen Lambert	282	13.0	
Green	Jonathan Buckley	178	8.2	
Liberal Democrats	John Livermore	167	7.7	
Green	Sean Hughes	141	6.5	
Liberal Democrats	Jim Pilling	131	6.0	
Independent	Chris Price	97	4.5	New
Turnout		2,171	39.0	
MB Independent hold				
MB Independent gain from Conservative				
Conservative hold				

=== Bolton and Slyne ===
Bolton and Slyne (3 seats)
Party	Candidate	Votes	%	±%
Conservative	Keith Budden	1,357	60.5	
Conservative	James Thomas	1,234	55.0	
Conservative	John Wild	1,125	50.2	
Labour	Louise Belcher	703	31.3	
Labour	Richard Martin	609	27.2	
Labour	Valerie Rogerson	471	21.0	
Liberal Democrats	Derek Kaye	405	18.1	
Turnout		2,243	37.0	
Conservative hold				
Conservative hold				
Conservative hold				

=== Bulk ===
Bulk (3 seats)
Party	Candidate	Votes	%	±%
Green	Tim Hamilton-Cox	1,199	56.6	
Green	Caroline Jackson	1,196	56.4	
Green	Lucie Carrington	1,055	49.8	
Labour	Andrew Kay	807	38.1	
Labour	Sue Clark	806	38.0	
Labour	Naley Alobari	734	34.6	
Conservative	Jack Downes	119	5.6	
Conservative	Tamsin Richardson	106	5.0	
Conservative	Kai Drury	99	4.7	
Turnout		2,120	33.0	
Green hold				
Green hold				
Green hold				

=== Carnforth and Millhead ===
Carnforth and Millhead (3 seats)
Party	Candidate	Votes	%	±%
Labour	John Reynolds	680	43.3	
Conservative	Peter Yates	588	37.4	
Conservative	Mel Guilding	499	31.8	
Conservative	Tobias Holbrook	440	28.0	
Labour	Sandi Haythornthwaite	395	25.1	
Labour	Luke Taylor	356	22.7	
Independent	Gregg Beaman	354	22.5	
Independent	Bob Roe	332	21.1	
Green	Kathy Bashford	199	12.7	
Green	Jan Maskell	142	9.0	
Green	Johnny Unger	108	6.9	
Turnout		1,571	34.0	
Labour gain from Conservative				
Conservative hold				
Conservative hold				

=== Castle ===
Castle (2 seats)
Party	Candidate	Votes	%	±%
Green	Dave Brookes	1,003	66.0	
Green	Paul Stubbins	851	56.0	
Labour	Stefanie Sinclair	445	29.3	
Labour	Peter Curphey	396	26.1	
Conservative	Tommy Shaw	102	6.7	
Conservative	Peter Williamson	99	6.5	
Turnout		1,519	31.0	
Green hold				
Green hold				

=== Ellel ===
Ellel (2 seats)
Party	Candidate	Votes	%	±%
Conservative	David Whitworth	576	40.8	
Conservative	Richard Austen-Baker	550	39.0	
Labour	Lisa Corkerry	439	31.1	
Labour	Shaun Corkerry	429	30.4	
Green	Mollie Foxall	279	19.8	
Green	Gisela Renolds	245	17.4	
Liberal Democrats	Paul Hindley	90	6.4	New
Liberal Democrats	Jade Sullivan	78	5.5	New
Turnout		1,411	40.0	
Conservative hold				
Conservative hold				

=== Halton-with-Aughton ===
Halton-with-Aughton
Party	Candidate	Votes	%	±%
Labour Co-op	Kevin Frea	484	50.8	+42.0
Conservative	Daniel Gibbins	381	40.0	+12.4
Liberal Democrats	Catherine Pilling	76	8.0	New
Turnout		952	47.0	
Labour Co-op gain from Independent		Swing		

=== Harbour ===
Harbour (3 seats)
Party	Candidate	Votes	%	±%
Labour	Janice Hanson	607	45.3	
Labour	David Whitaker	544	40.6	
Labour	Darren Clifford	478	35.7	
MB Independent	Jack Newton	433	32.3	
MB Independent	Marius Balcer	408	30.4	
MB Independent	Mirka Balcer	403	30.1	
Conservative	Alexandra Hailey	169	12.6	
Conservative	Craig Mercer	168	12.5	
Green	Simone Chadwick	166	12.4	
Conservative	Rhiannon Williamson	163	12.2	
Green	Jay-Yahia El Mozee	88	6.6	
Turnout		1,340	25.0	
Labour hold				
Labour hold				
Labour hold				

=== Heysham Central ===
Heysham Central (2 seats)
Party	Candidate	Votes	%	±%
MB Independent	Cary Matthews	542	49.0	
MB Independent	Geoff Knight	524	47.4	
Labour	Sarah Hayland	360	32.6	
Labour	Ian Walton	316	28.6	
Conservative	Kenneth Brown	185	16.7	
Conservative	Samuel Donnelly	176	15.9	
Turnout		1,105	32.0	
MB Independent gain from Labour				
MB Independent hold				

=== Heysham North ===
Heysham North (2 seats)
Party	Candidate	Votes	%	±%
MB Independent	Roger Cleet	429	47.6	
MB Independent	Vicky Boyd-Power	405	45.0	
Labour	Margaret Pattison	391	43.4	
Labour	John Hanson	318	35.3	
Conservative	Joseph Wilson	96	10.7	
Conservative	John Marsden	95	10.5	
Turnout		901	27.0	
MB Independent gain from Labour				
MB Independent gain from Labour				

=== Heysham South ===
Heysham South (3 seats)
Party	Candidate	Votes	%	±%
Labour	Colin Hartley	548	37.1	
MB Independent	Mike Greenall	540	36.6	
Labour	Alan Biddulph	518	35.1	
Labour	Mandy Wildman	509	34.5	
MB Independent	Steve Matthews	487	33.0	
Conservative	Stuart Bateson	449	30.4	
MB Independent	Wendy Blundell	403	27.3	
Conservative	Eric Hamer	349	23.6	
Conservative	Judith Hamer	348	23.6	
Turnout		1,476	28.0	
Labour hold				
MB Independent gain from Conservative				
Labour hold				

=== John O'Gaunt ===
John O'Gaunt (3 seats)
Party	Candidate	Votes	%	±%
Labour	Erica Lewis	840	44.2	
Labour	Faye Penny	827	43.5	
Labour	Alistair Sinclair	772	40.6	
Green	Marianne Waine	701	36.9	
Green	Rebecca Whittle	684	36.0	
Green	Ceri Turner	648	34.1	
Conservative	Janet Walton	227	11.9	
Conservative	Ryan Whittaker	224	11.8	
Conservative	Kevan Walton	209	11.0	
Liberal Democrats	James Harvey	186	9.8	
Liberal Democrats	Phil Dunster	149	7.8	
Turnout		1,902	32.0	
Labour hold				
Labour hold				
Labour hold				

=== Kellet ===
Kellet
Party	Candidate	Votes	%	±%
Liberal Democrats	Michael Mumford	337	44.6	New
Conservative	Andrew Gardiner	331	43.8	−28.9
Labour	Diana Martin	76	10.1	−6.0
Turnout		755	43.0	
Liberal Democrats gain from Conservative		Swing		

=== Lower Lune Valley ===
Lower Lune Valley (2 seats)
Party	Candidate	Votes	%	±%
Liberal Democrats	Joyce Pritchard	658	44.3	
Conservative	Joan Jackson	628	42.3	
Liberal Democrats	Peter Jackson	597	40.2	
Conservative	Jane Parkinson	564	38.0	
Labour Co-op	Lucy Atkinson	193	13.0	
Labour Co-op	Nathan Burns	177	11.9	
Turnout		1,484	41.0	
Liberal Democrats gain from Conservative				
Conservative hold				

=== Marsh ===
Marsh (2 seats)
Party	Candidate	Votes	%	±%
Green	Gina Dowding	1,174	71.8	
Green	Mandy Bannon	1,109	67.8	
Labour	Pete Cakebread	381	23.3	
Labour	Nicky Snell	348	21.3	
Conservative	Daniel Sims	90	5.5	
Conservative	Ayesha Hilton	88	5.4	
Turnout		1,636	40.0	
Green hold				
Green hold				

=== Overton ===
Overton
Party	Candidate	Votes	%	±%
Conservative	Michael Smith	291	44.6	+2.9
Labour	Tom Porter	265	40.6	+18.4
Green	Pamela White	81	12.4	+7.6
Turnout		652	36.0	
Conservative hold		Swing		

=== Poulton ===
Poulton (2 seats)
Party	Candidate	Votes	%	±%
MB Independent	Tricia Heath	363	38.4	
MB Independent	Debbie Jenkins	269	28.4	
Labour	Brendan Hughes	259	27.4	
Labour	Terrie Metcalfe	245	25.9	
Liberal Democrats	Paul Hart	224	23.7	New
Conservative	Shirley Gardiner	116	12.3	
Green	Philip Chandler	84	8.9	
Conservative	Joan Yates	74	7.8	
Green	Chloe Buckley	66	7.0	
Liberal Democrats	Andrew Hastings	53	5.6	
Turnout		946	26.0	
MB Independent gain from Labour				
MB Independent gain from Labour				

=== Scotforth East ===
Scotforth East (2 seats)
Party	Candidate	Votes	%	±%
Labour	Patricia Whitehead	655	47.5	
Labour	Jason Wood	578	41.9	
Conservative	Cameron Fernie	359	26.0	
Conservative	Rebecca Samuels	339	24.6	
Green	Rosie Mills	264	19.1	
Green	Andrew Lee	243	17.6	
Liberal Democrats	Robin Long	125	9.1	
Liberal Democrats	Graham Pollitt	97	7.0	
Turnout		1,379	40.0	
Labour hold				
Labour hold				

=== Scotforth West ===
Scotforth West (3 seats)
Party	Candidate	Votes	%	±%
Green	Abi Mills	1,488	61.2	
Green	Joanna Young	1,319	54.3	
Green	Tim Dant	1,303	53.6	
Labour	Ronnie Kershaw	774	31.9	
Labour	Mohammad Malik	656	27.0	
Labour	Linda Prue	625	25.7	
Conservative	Joe Wrennall	280	11.5	
Conservative	Josh Smith	274	11.3	
Conservative	Oliver Kerry	270	11.1	
Turnout		2,430	44.0	
Green hold				
Green gain from Labour				
Green gain from Labour				

=== Silverdale ===
Silverdale
Party	Candidate	Votes	%	±%
Liberal Democrats	June Greenwell	501	55.8	+32.4
Conservative	Iain Harbison	296	33.0	+3.7
Labour	Brenda Rockall	84	9.4	+1.3
Turnout		898	55.0	
Liberal Democrats gain from Conservative		Swing		

=== Skerton East ===
Skerton East (3 seats)
Party	Candidate	Votes	%	±%
Labour	Anna Thornberry	627	51.9	
Labour	Robert Redfern	619	51.3	
Labour	Abbott Bryning	607	50.3	
Green	Erik Worsley	321	26.6	
Green	Ceiteag Sinclair	273	22.6	
UKIP	Simon Platt	190	15.7	New
Conservative	John Doherty	188	15.6	−15.4
Conservative	Margaret Colling	179	14.8	
Conservative	Kathleen Mashiter	163	13.5	
Turnout		1,207	25.0	
Labour hold				
Labour hold				
Labour hold				

=== Skerton West ===
Skerton West (3 seats)
Party	Candidate	Votes	%	±%
Labour	Phillip Black	599	49.3	
Labour	Mandy King	590	48.6	
Labour	Hilda Parr	581	47.9	
Conservative	Colin Hewitt	320	26.4	
Conservative	Matthew Reader	274	22.6	
Green	Melanie Forrest	269	22.2	
Conservative	Thomas Inman	252	20.8	
Green	Daniel Burba	240	19.8	
Turnout		1,214	23.0	
Labour hold				
Labour hold				
Labour hold				

=== Torrisholme ===
Torrisholme (2 seats)
Party	Candidate	Votes	%	±%
MB Independent	Paul Anderton	705	51.7	
MB Independent	Roger Dennison	634	46.5	
Conservative	Mark Phelps	325	23.8	
Conservative	Jane Cottam	298	21.9	
Labour	Joanne Ainscough	283	20.8	
Labour	Emma Corless	270	19.8	
Turnout		1,363	38.0	
MB Independent gain from Conservative				
MB Independent gain from Labour				

=== University and Scotforth Rural ===
University and Scotforth Rural (3 seats)
Party	Candidate	Votes	%	±%
Labour	Katie Whearty	295	44.0	
Labour	Jack O'Dwyer-Henry	278	41.5	
Labour	Oliver Robinson	267	39.9	
Green	Emily Heath	217	32.4	
Green	Victoria Hatch	175	26.1	
Green	Martin Paley	142	21.2	
Conservative	Guy Watts	119	17.8	
Conservative	Robert Ogden	113	16.9	
Conservative	Luke Brandon	112	16.7	
Liberal Democrats	Tom Sutton	88	13.1	
Liberal Democrats	Dafydd Roberts	83	12.4	
Liberal Democrats	Jake Perkins	72	10.7	
Turnout		670	18.0	
Labour hold				
Labour gain from Green				
Labour hold				

=== Upper Lune Valley ===
Upper Lune Valley
Party	Candidate	Votes	%	±%
Conservative	Stewart Scothern	419	44.7	−27.1
Liberal Democrats	Ross Hunter	402	42.9	New
Labour	Joseph Rigby	92	9.8	−4.5
Turnout		937	48.0	
Conservative hold		Swing		

=== Warton ===
Warton
Party	Candidate	Votes	%	±%
Conservative	Adrian Duggan	307	46.7	+3.9
Green	Rex Ambler	214	32.5	+18.3
Labour	Colette Bain	129	19.6	−2.0
Turnout		658	40.0	
Conservative hold		Swing		

=== Westgate ===
Westgate (3 seats)
Party	Candidate	Votes	%	±%
MB Independent	Merv Evans	632	41.7	
MB Independent	Jason Firth	607	40.1	
MB Independent	Jake Goodwin	572	37.8	
Labour	Ian Clift	523	34.5	
Labour	Debbie Hutton	481	31.8	
Labour	Claire Cozler	440	29.1	
Conservative	Clare Ainscow	278	18.4	
Conservative	John Gibbins	224	14.8	
Conservative	Daniel Jones	206	13.6	
Liberal Democrats	Richard Blaikie	113	7.5	New
Turnout		1,514	27.0	
MB Independent gain from Labour				
MB Independent gain from Labour				
MB Independent gain from Labour				

== By-elections ==
=== Overton ===
Overton: 12 December 2019
Party	Candidate	Votes	%	±%
Conservative	Andrew Gardiner	650	52.3	+6.6
Labour	Tom Porter	527	42.4	+0.8
Liberal Democrats	Amy Stanning	65	5.2	N/A
Majority		123	9.9	
Turnout		1242		
Conservative hold				

The Overton by-election was triggered by the resignation of Conservative Councillor Michael Smith.

=== Bulk ===
Bulk: 6 May 2021
Party	Candidate	Votes	%	±%
Green	Jack Lenox	1,283	54.3	+4.1
Labour	Anna Lee	824	34.9	−3.5
Conservative	Matthew Maxwell-Scott	209	8.9	+3.2
Liberal Democrats	Katia Adimora	45	1.9	N/A
Majority		23	4.9	
Turnout		459	19.4	
Green hold		Swing		

The Bulk by-election was triggered by the resignation of Green Councillor Lucie Carrington.

=== Kellet ===
Kellet: 6 May 2021
Party	Candidate	Votes	%	±%
Conservative	Stuart Morris	447	50.9	+6.4
Liberal Democrats	Ross Hunter	271	30.8	−14.5
Independent	Kathryn Atkins	161	18.3	N/A
Majority		176	20.1	
Turnout				
Conservative gain from Liberal Democrats		Swing		

The Kellet by-election was triggered by the death of Liberal Democrat Councillor Michael Mumford.

=== University & Scotforth Rural ===
University & Scotforth Rural: 11 November 2021
Party	Candidate	Votes	%	±%
Labour	Sayeda Askari	216	46.1	+4.0
Green	Jamie Payne	193	41.2	+8.4
Conservative	Matthew Maxwell-Scott	44	9.4	−8.6
Liberal Democrats	Zanna Ashton	16	3.4	−9.9
Majority		23	4.9	
Turnout		469		
Labour hold		Swing		

The University & Scotforth Rural by-election was triggered by the resignation of Councillor Jack O'Dwyer-Henry, elected as Labour in 2019 and sitting as an Eco-Socialist Independent at the time of his resignation.

=== Carnforth & Millhead ===
Carnforth & Millhead: 25 November 2021
Party	Candidate	Votes	%	±%
Labour	Luke Taylor	538	57.7	+13.9
Conservative	Stuart Bateson	315	33.8	+5.5
Green	Padruig McMurray	54	5.8	−7.0
Liberal Democrats	Anthony Saville	25	2.7	N/A
Majority		223	23.9	
Turnout		937	20.1	
Labour hold		Swing	▲9.5	

The Carnforth & Millhead by-election was triggered by the resignation of Councillor John Reynolds, elected as Labour in 2016 and sitting as an independent at the time of his resignation.

=== Bare ===
Bare: 2 December 2021
Party	Candidate	Votes	%	±%
Liberal Democrats	Gerry Blaikie	428	33.1	+20.1
Green	James Sommerville	301	23.3	+15.1
MB Independent	June Ashworth	243	18.8	−8.8
Conservative	Jane Cottam	215	16.6	−16.7
Labour	Valerie Rogerson	107	8.3	−10.5
Majority		127	9.8	
Turnout		1,299	23.49	
Liberal Democrats gain from Conservative		Swing	▲2.5	

The Bare by-election was triggered by the death of Conservative Councillor Stephie Barber.

=== Upper Lune Valley ===
Upper Lune Valley: 2 December 2021
Party	Candidate	Votes	%	±%
Liberal Democrats	Ross Hunter	390	63.1	+19.1
Conservative	Iain Harbison	183	29.6	−16.3
Green	Nicky Sharkey	24	3.9	N/A
Labour	Faith Kenrick	21	3.4	−6.7
Majority		207	33.5	
Turnout		620	31.70	
Liberal Democrats gain from Conservative		Swing	▲17.7	

The Upper Lune Valley by-election was triggered by the death of Conservative Councillor Stewart Scothern.

=== Ellel ===
Ellel: 19 May 2022
Party	Candidate	Votes	%	±%
Green	Sally Maddocks	547	39.7	+19.5
Labour	Lisa Corkerry	418	30.4	−1.2
Conservative	Janet Walton	377	27.4	−14.4
Liberal Democrats	Robert Fildes	35	2.5	−4.0
Majority		129	9.3	
Turnout		1,381	37.8	
Green gain from Conservative		Swing	▲10.4	

The Ellel by-election was triggered by the disqualification of Conservative Councillor David Whitworth under section 85 of the Local Government Act 1972, after he failed to attend a council meeting for six months.

=== Harbour ===
Harbour: 21 July 2022
Party	Candidate	Votes	%	±%
Labour	Margaret Pattison	555	47.9	+1.7
Liberal Democrats	Jake Perkins	479	41.4	N/A
Conservative	Colin Hewitt	124	10.7	−2.2
Turnout		1,158		
Labour hold				

The Harbour by-election was triggered by the death of Labour Councillor Janice Hanson, who suffered a stroke.

=== Warton ===
Warton: 8 September 2022
Party	Candidate	Votes	%	±%
Green	Sue Tyldesley	452	65.7	+32.8
Conservative	Iain Harbison	169	24.6	−22.7
Labour	Faith Kenrick	44	6.4	−13.5
Liberal Democrats	Jane Parsons	23	3.3	N/A
Majority		283	41.1	
Turnout		688	40.5	
Green gain from Conservative		Swing		

The Warton by-election was triggered by the resignation of Conservative Councillor Adrian de la Mare (elected in 2019 as Adrian Duggan).
