= 2023 Lancaster City Council election =

Election

- 4 May 2023

All 61 seats to Lancaster City Council 31 seats needed for a majority

	First party	Second party	Third party
Leader	Erica Lewis	Gina Dowding	Joyce Pritchard
Party	Labour	Green	Liberal Democrats
Last election	21 seats, 33.7%	10 seats, 21.8%	3 seats, 6.0%
Seats before	16	15	4
Seats won	24	21	7
Seat change	▲3	▲11	▲4
Popular vote	24,280	22,670	7,691
Percentage	31.8%	29.7%	10.1%
Swing	▼1.9%	▲7.9%	▲4.1%
	Fourth party	Fifth party	Sixth party
Leader	Andrew Gardiner	Geoff Knight	Roger Cleet
Party	Conservative	MB Independent	Independent
Last election	12 seats, 24.4%	14 seats, 12.9%	0 seats, 1.0%
Seats before	9	6	8
Seats won	5	3	1
Seat change	▼7	▼11	▲1
Popular vote	14,820	6,116	821
Percentage	19.4%	8.0%	1.1%
Swing	▼5.0%	▼4.9%	▲0.1%
- Winner of each seat at the 2023 Lancaster City Council election
Leader before election
Caroline Jackson
Green
No overall control
Leader after election
Phillip Black
Labour
No overall control

The 2023 Lancaster City Council election took place on 4 May 2023 to elect members of Lancaster City Council in Lancashire, England. This was on the same day as other local elections in England. New ward boundaries took effect for this election, increasing the number of seats from 60 to 61.

== Summary ==
Before the election the council was under no overall control, being run by a coalition of Labour, the Greens and independent councillors, led by Green councillor Caroline Jackson. The council remained under no overall control after the election and the Labour group leader, Erica Lewis, lost her seat.

A new coalition of Labour, the Greens and Liberal Democrats formed an administration after the election, led by new Labour group leader Phillip Black, who was appointed leader of the council at the subsequent annual council meeting on 22 May 2023.

=== Election result ===
2023 Lancaster City Council
Party	Candidates	Seats	Gains	Losses	Net gain/loss	Seats %	Votes %	Votes	+/−
Labour	56	24	9	2	▲3	39.3	31.8	24,280	–1.9
Green	61	21	5	0	▲11	34.4	29.7	22,670	+7.9
Liberal Democrats	36	7	5	0	▲4	11.5	10.1	7,691	+4.1
Conservative	51	5	0	7	▼7	8.2	19.4	14,820	–5.0
MB Independent	21	3	0	11	▼11	4.9	8.0	6,116	–4.9
Independent	5	1	1	0	▲1	1.6	1.1	821	+0.1

== Ward results ==
The Statement of Persons Nominated, which details the candidates standing in each ward, was released by Lancaster City Council following the close of nominations on 4 April 2023. The results for each ward were as follows:

=== Bare ===
Bare (3 seats)
Party	Candidate	Votes	%	±%
Liberal Democrats	Gerry Blaikie*	486	26.0	
Conservative	Kate Knight	466	24.9	
MB Independent	David Bottoms	459	24.5	
Conservative	Stuart Bateson	447	23.9	
MB Independent	Sarah Knight*	445	23.8	
Conservative	Matthew Jakeman	430	23.0	
Labour	Christian Ainscough	399	21.3	
MB Independent	Russell Walsh	358	19.1	
Liberal Democrats	Lynda Dagdeviren	349	18.7	
Labour	Faith Kenrick	328	17.5	
Liberal Democrats	Dan Balsamini	309	16.5	
Independent	Mark Dugan	288	15.4	
Green	Lucie Carrington	191	10.2	
Green	Sean Hughes	131	7.0	
Green	Andy Lee	113	6.0	
Turnout		1,871	33.8	–5.2
Liberal Democrats gain from MB Independent				
Conservative hold				
MB Independent hold				

=== Bolton and Slyne ===
Bolton and Slyne (3 seats)
Party	Candidate	Votes	%	±%
Conservative	Keith Budden*	1,050	49.4	
Conservative	Paul Newton	1,010	47.5	
Conservative	John Wild*	985	46.3	
Labour	Craig Mossop	618	29.1	
Labour	Kate Mossop	572	26.9	
Liberal Democrats	Ivan Wheatley	421	19.8	
Liberal Democrats	Tony Saville	405	19.0	
Green	Laura Mumford	342	16.1	
Green	Janet Swan	269	12.7	
Green	Gideon Flemming	216	10.2	
Turnout		2,126	36.0	–1.0
Conservative hold				
Conservative hold				
Conservative hold				

=== Bowerham ===
Bowerham (2 seats)
Party	Candidate	Votes	%	±%
Green	Hamish Mills	736	50.7	
Green	Sarah Punshon	696	47.9	
Labour Co-op	Erica Lewis*	604	41.6	
Labour Co-op	Peter Curphey	541	37.2	
Conservative	Charles Edwards	131	9.0	
Conservative	Charlotte Whitehouse	120	8.3	
Liberal Democrats	Lisa Sue-Too	30	2.1	
Turnout		1,453	36.7	
Green win (new seat)				
Green win (new seat)				

=== Bulk ===
Bulk (3 seats)
Party	Candidate	Votes	%	±%
Green	Caroline Jackson*	1,140	64.0	
Green	Jack Lenox*	1,061	59.5	
Green	Sam Riches	964	54.1	
Labour	Stefanie Doebler	610	34.2	
Labour	Richard Johnson	546	30.6	
Labour	Daniel Fletcher	516	29.0	
Conservative	Callum Banthorpe	109	6.1	
Conservative	Nathan Gaskill	107	6.0	
Conservative	Kyle Hall	104	5.8	
Liberal Democrats	Phil Dunster	71	4.0	
Turnout		1,782	30.9	
Green hold				
Green hold				
Green hold				

=== Carnforth and Millhead ===
Carnforth and Millhead (3 seats)
Party	Candidate	Votes	%	±%
Labour Co-op	Paul Gardner	633	47.8	
Labour Co-op	Louise Belcher	586	44.2	
Labour Co-op	Chris Hanna	571	43.1	
Conservative	Kath Bromilow	536	40.5	
Conservative	Peter Yates*	534	40.3	
Conservative	Mel Guilding*	490	37.0	
Green	Amelia Jones	141	10.6	
Green	Daren Chandisingh	127	9.6	
Green	Jon Sear	125	9.4	
Turnout		1,325	28.1	–5.9
Labour Co-op hold				
Labour Co-op gain from Conservative				
Labour Co-op gain from Conservative				

=== Castle ===
Castle (3 seats)
Party	Candidate	Votes	%	±%
Green	Dave Brookes*	767	63.6	
Green	Shelagh McGregor	711	59.0	
Green	Paul Stubbins*	657	54.5	
Labour	Jeremy Bateman	383	31.8	
Labour	Emma Corless	362	30.0	
Labour	Becca Snow	320	26.5	
Conservative	Kevan Walton	93	7.7	
Conservative	Scott Farmer	82	6.8	
Conservative	Jakub Stuchlik	75	6.2	
Liberal Democrats	Henry Beesley	66	5.5	
Turnout		1,206	22.8	–8.2
Green hold				
Green hold				
Green win (new seat)				

=== Ellel ===
Ellel (2 seats)
Party	Candidate	Votes	%	±%
Green	Sally Maddocks*	951	58.1	
Green	Paul Tynan	733	44.8	
Conservative	Jason Park	426	26.0	
Conservative	Richard Austen-Baker*	412	25.2	
Labour Co-op	Shaun Corkerry	295	18.0	
Labour Co-op	Anna Hopkins	245	15.0	
Liberal Democrats	Robert Fildes	54	3.3	
Turnout		1,637	40.7	+0.7
Green gain from Conservative				
Green gain from Conservative				

=== Halton-with-Aughton and Kellet ===
Halton-with-Aughton and Kellet (2 seats)
Party	Candidate	Votes	%	±%
Green	Sarah McGowan	716	46.4	
Green	James Sommerville	648	42.0	
Conservative	Daniel Gibbins	582	37.7	
Conservative	Stuart Morris	464	30.1	
Labour	Kathryn Hyde	280	18.1	
Liberal Democrats	Thomas White	153	9.9	
Turnout		1,544	39.6	
Green win (new seat)				
Green win (new seat)				

=== Heysham Central ===
Heysham Central (2 seats)
Party	Candidate	Votes	%	±%
Labour	Catherine Armistead	430	41.0	
Labour	Susan Penney	386	36.8	
MB Independent	Geoff Knight*	370	35.3	
MB Independent	Gina Thistlethwaite	363	34.6	
Conservative	Lee Taylor-Craddock	214	20.4	
Green	Joanna Young	111	10.6	
Green	Cai Wingfield	49	4.7	
Liberal Democrats	Ben Foulsham	21	2.0	
Turnout		1,048	30.2	–1.8
Labour gain from MB Independent				
Labour gain from MB Independent				

=== Heysham North ===
Heysham North (2 seats)
Party	Candidate	Votes	%	±%
Labour Co-op	Claire Cozler	270	38.4	
Independent	Roger Cleet*	221	31.4	
Labour Co-op	Mark Jarnell	201	28.6	
MB Independent	Clark Kent	174	24.7	
MB Independent	Anthony Padgett	130	18.5	
Conservative	Sam Mall	104	14.8	
Liberal Democrats	Elaine Chapple	68	9.7	
Liberal Democrats	Louise Stansfield	44	6.3	
Green	Jan Maskell	32	4.5	
Green	Patrick McMurray	20	2.8	
Turnout		704	20.5	–6.5
Labour gain from MB Independent				
Independent gain from MB Independent				

=== Heysham South ===
Heysham South (3 seats)
Party	Candidate	Votes	%	±%
Labour	Colin Hartley*	737	50.0	
Labour	Philip Bradley	707	48.0	
Labour	Catherine Potter	651	44.2	
Conservative	Bill Riley	425	28.9	
MB Independent	Mike Greenall*	390	26.5	
Conservative	Pat Freeman	341	23.2	
MB Independent	Emma Knight	272	18.5	
MB Independent	Josiah Fulton	266	18.1	
Green	Maria Deery	74	5.0	
Green	Gisela Renolds	68	4.6	
Green	Hildy Wild	50	3.4	
Liberal Democrats	Sheldon Kent	43	2.9	
Turnout		1,473	28.4	+0.4
Labour hold				
Labour gain from MB Independent				
Labour hold				

=== John O'Gaunt ===
John O'Gaunt (2 seats)
Party	Candidate	Votes	%	±%
Green	Suhir Abuhajar	551	52.7	
Green	Grace Russell	498	47.6	
Labour Co-op	Lisa Corkerry	441	42.2	
Labour Co-op	Linda Prue	395	37.8	
Conservative	Morgan Gray	66	6.3	
Conservative	Paul Kitchen	60	5.7	
Liberal Democrats	James Harvey	26	2.5	
Turnout		1,046	31.4	–0.6
Green gain from Labour				
Green gain from Labour				

Due to ward boundary changes, the number of seats in this ward was reduced from 3 to 2.

=== Lower Lune Valley ===
Lower Lune Valley (2 seats)
Party	Candidate	Votes	%	±%
Liberal Democrats	Joyce Pritchard*	733	48.6	
Liberal Democrats	Peter Jackson	606	40.2	
Conservative	Joan Jackson*	570	37.8	
Conservative	Matthew Maxwell-Scott	435	28.8	
Labour	Mandy King	169	11.2	
Labour	Andrew Kay	161	10.7	
Green	Mike Wright	144	9.5	
Green	Rosie Mills	113	7.5	
Turnout		1,508	40.7	–0.3
Liberal Democrats hold				
Liberal Democrats gain from Conservative				

=== Marsh ===
Marsh (3 seats)
Party	Candidate	Votes	%	±%
Green	Gina Dowding*	1,241	70.3	
Green	Mandy Bannon*	1,223	69.3	
Green	Nick Wilkinson	1,079	61.1	
Labour	Jessica Rafferty	408	23.1	
Labour	Morgane Cozler	399	22.6	
Labour	Benjamin Soffa	354	20.0	
Conservative	Joe Wrennall	125	7.1	
Conservative	Anthony Harmey	113	6.4	
Conservative	Ryan Timmings	110	6.2	
Liberal Democrats	Amy Stanning	98	5.5	
Turnout		1,766	33.6	–6.4
Green hold				
Green hold				
Green win (new seat)				

Due to ward boundary changes, the number of seats in this ward was increased from 2 to 3.

=== Overton ===
Overton
Party	Candidate	Votes	%	±%
Conservative	Andrew Gardiner*	241	40.6	
Labour	Jean Yates	185	31.2	
MB Independent	Jason Slater	130	21.9	
Green	David Maddocks	37	6.2	
Majority		56	9.4	
Turnout		593	30.8	–5.2
Conservative hold		Swing		

=== Poulton ===
Poulton (2 seats)
Party	Candidate	Votes	%	±%
Liberal Democrats	Paul Hart	395	51.3	
Liberal Democrats	John Livermore	304	39.5	
Labour	Terrie Metcalfe	227	29.5	
Labour	Matthew Panesh	198	25.7	
MB Independent	Tricia Heath*	167	21.7	
MB Independent	Jaimie Heath	154	17.7	
Green	Pete Moser	60	6.9	
Conservative	Joan Yates	59	6.8	
Green	Julie McMurray	38	4.4	
Independent	Vicky Boyd-Power	26	3.0	
Turnout		870	22.8	–3.2
Liberal Democrats gain from MB Independent				
Liberal Democrats gain from MB Independent				

=== Scale Hall ===
Scale Hall (3 seats)
Party	Candidate	Votes	%	±%
Labour	Ruth Colbridge	663	59.7	
Labour	Hilda Parr*	655	59.0	
Labour	Philip Black*	639	57.5	
Conservative	Joanne Lowther-Edwards	263	23.7	
Green	Dominic Hardy	164	14.8	
Green	Ceri Turner	164	14.8	
Liberal Democrats	Jessica Long	139	12.5	
Green	Geoffrey Pogson	127	11.4	
Turnout		1,111	21.2	
Labour win (new seat)				
Labour win (new seat)				
Labour win (new seat)				

=== Scotforth East ===
Scotforth East (2 seats)
Party	Candidate	Votes	%	±%
Labour Co-op	Sophie Maddocks	607	42.9	
Labour Co-op	Jason Wood*	529	37.4	
Green	Nancy Mills	526	37.2	
Green	Caroline Robertson	473	33.4	
Conservative	Stephanie Hoggarth	278	19.6	
Conservative	Georges Quinn	209	14.8	
Liberal Democrats	Robin Long	87	6.1	
Turnout		1,415	40.4	
Labour hold				
Labour hold				

=== Scotforth West ===
Scotforth West (2 seats)
Party	Candidate	Votes	%	±%
Green	Abi Mills*	1,083	63.5	
Green	Tim Hamilton-Cox	1,023	60.0	
Labour	Fabiha Askari	387	22.7	
Labour	Davina Miller	373	21.9	
Conservative	Leon Dexter	207	12.1	
Conservative	Harvey Hayes	162	9.5	
Liberal Democrats	Malcolm Martin	73	4.3	
Turnout		1,705	42.5	
Green hold				
Green hold				

Due to ward boundary changes, the number of seats in this ward was reduced from 3 to 2.

=== Silverdale ===
Silverdale
Party	Candidate	Votes	%	±%
Liberal Democrats	William Greenwell	363	40.5	
Conservative	Phillippa Williamson	321	35.8	
Labour	Brenda Rockall	115	12.8	
Green	Anna McCoy	97	10.8	
Majority		42	4.7	
Turnout		896	54.7	–0.3
Liberal Democrats hold		Swing		

=== Skerton ===
Skerton (3 seats)
Party	Candidate	Votes	%	±%
Labour	Robert Redfern*	696	60.1	
Labour	Anna Thornberry*	659	56.9	
Labour	Geoffrey Gawith	615	53.1	
Green	Emlyn Busby	271	23.4	
Green	Kathryn Bain	239	20.6	
Green	Emily Heath	232	20.0	
Conservative	Julian Webb	168	14.5	
Conservative	Alexandra Hailey	153	13.2	
Conservative	Michael Wilkinson	148	12.8	
Liberal Democrats	Derek Kaye	95	8.2	
Turnout		1,159	22.36	
Labour win (new seat)				
Labour win (new seat)				
Labour win (new seat)				

=== Torrisholme ===
Torrisholme (2 seats)
Party	Candidate	Votes	%	±%
MB Independent	Roger Dennison*	443	37.7	
MB Independent	Brett Cooper	376	32.0	
Conservative	Colin Hewitt	321	27.3	
Labour	Thomas Penney	292	24.9	
Independent	Cary Matthews	153	13.0	
Green	Rob Livesey	144	12.3	
Independent	Wendy Cowley	133	11.3	
Green	Rebecca Willmott	87	7.4	
Liberal Democrats	Teresa Wilson	73	6.2	
Turnout		1,174	32.6	–5.4
MB Independent hold				
MB Independent hold				

=== University ===
University (2 seats)
Party	Candidate	Votes	%	±%
Labour Co-op	Erin Hall	217	45.0	
Green	Tom Fish	197	40.9	
Green	Isabella Metcalf-Riener	190	39.4	
Labour Co-op	Lewis Hurst	172	35.7	
Conservative	Bawan Hassan	64	13.3	
Conservative	Khai Helmy	55	11.4	
Liberal Democrats	Cormac Evans	34	7.1	
Liberal Democrats	Thomas Cross	29	6.0	
Turnout		482	12.3	
Labour Co-op win (new seat)				
Green win (new seat)				

=== Upper Lune Valley ===
Upper Lune Valley
Party	Candidate	Votes	%	±%
Liberal Democrats	Ross Hunter*	483	59.3	+15.3
Conservative	Jane Parkinson	257	31.6	−14.3
Green	Jamie Payne	74	9.1	N/A
Majority		226	27.7	
Turnout		814	45.0	–3.0
Liberal Democrats gain from Conservative		Swing		

=== Warton ===
Warton
Party	Candidate	Votes	%	±%
Green	Sue Tyldesley*	415	52.7	
Conservative	Tom Harvey	232	29.5	
Labour	David Ainsworth	74	9.4	
Liberal Democrats	Jane Parsons	66	8.4	
Majority		183	23.2	
Turnout		787	39.3	
Green gain from Conservative		Swing		

=== West End ===
West End (3 seats)
Party	Candidate	Votes	%	±%
Labour	Margaret Pattison	543	44.3	
Labour	Joanne Ainscough	497	40.5	
Labour	David Whitaker*	477	38.9	
Liberal Democrats	Catherine Pilling	393	32.1	
Liberal Democrats	Jake Perkins	382	31.2	
Liberal Democrats	Jim Pilling	365	29.8	
MB Independent	Trevor Duncan	177	14.4	
MB Independent	Kate Aspinall	157	12.8	
MB Independent	Angela Fletcher	155	12.6	
Conservative	Michael Ennis	104	8.5	
Green	Clara Bandszus	60	4.9	
Green	Sarah Hester	56	4.6	
Green	Mark Westcombe	42	3.4	
Turnout		1,226	22.1	
Labour win (new seat)				
Labour win (new seat)				
Labour win (new seat)				

=== Westgate ===
Westgate (3 seats)
Party	Candidate	Votes	%	±%
Labour	John Hanson	491	38.6	
Labour	Matthew Black	437	34.3	
Labour	Chris Harris	414	32.5	
MB Independent	Dan Blacow	408	32.1	
MB Independent	Debbie Knight	393	30.9	
MB Independent	Wayne Dixon	382	30.0	
Liberal Democrats	Bill Jackson	225	17.7	
Conservative	Carole Johnston	182	14.3	
Conservative	Stuart Staig	180	14.1	
Liberal Democrats	Monika Stenneken	120	9.4	
Liberal Democrats	Tom Sutton	82	6.4	
Green	Kathy Bashford	71	5.6	
Green	Alison Gordon	62	4.9	
Green	Jago Westaway	50	3.9	
Turnout		1,273	22.9	–4.1
Labour gain from MB Independent				
Labour gain from MB Independent				
Labour gain from MB Independent				

== By-elections ==
=== Castle ===
Castle: 14 March 2024
Party	Candidate	Votes	%	±%
Green	Isabella Metcalf-Riener	524	65.0	+6.0
Labour	Emily Jones	212	26.3	−5.5
Conservative	Daniel Kirk	43	5.3	−2.4
Liberal Democrats	Cormac Evans	27	3.3	−3.3
Turnout		810	16	–7
Green hold				

The Castle by-election was triggered by the resignation of Green Councillor Shelagh McGregor, who stood down shortly after her May 2023 election in order to move away from the area.

=== Carnforth and Millhead ===
Carnforth and Millhead: 2 May 2024
Party	Candidate	Votes	%	±%
Labour	Jackson Stubbs	644	47.3	−0.5
Conservative	Peter Yates	454	33.4	−6.9
Green	Emily Heath	194	14.3	+3.7
Liberal Democrats	Lynda Dagdeviren	69	5.1	N/A
Turnout		1,371	29	+1
Labour hold				

The Carnforth and Millhead by-election was triggered by the death of Labour Councillor Paul Gardner in December 2023, aged 70.

=== University ===
University: 4 July 2024
Party	Candidate	Votes	%	±%
Green	Maria Deery	96	45.1	+5.7
Labour	Anya Wilkinson-Leishman	83	39.0	−6.0
Conservative	Matthew Maxwell-Scott	23	10.8	−2.5
Liberal Democrats	Thomas Willis	11	5.2	−1.9
Turnout		215	6	−6
Green gain from Labour		Swing		

The University by-election was triggered by the resignation of Labour Councillor Erin Hall, a former Lancaster University student elected in 2023, who moved away from the area.

=== Scotforth East ===
Scotforth East: 3 October 2024
Party	Candidate	Votes	%	±%
Green	Andrew Otway	623	57.8	+20.6
Labour	Mark Jarnell	241	22.4	−20.5
Conservative	Timothy Wood	148	13.7	−5.9
Liberal Democrats	Malcolm Martin	66	6.1	±0.0
Turnout		1,079	31	−9
Green gain from Labour		Swing		

The Scotforth East by-election was triggered by the resignation of Labour Councillor Sophie Maddocks for health reasons.

=== Castle ===
Castle: 21 May 2026
Party	Candidate	Votes	%	±%
Green	Will Farley	845	70.0	+5.0
Labour	William David Evans	190	15.7	−10.6
Reform	Marco Wright	132	10.9	N/A
Liberal Democrats	Malcolm Allan Martin	41	3.4	+0.1
Turnout		1,211	25	+9
Green hold				

The Castle by-election was triggered by the resignation of Green Councillor Isabella "Izzy" Metcalf-Riener, who was elected in the ward's 2024 by-election and stood down to move away from the district for a new job.
