= 2003 Lancaster City Council election =

Local election in Lancaster, England

- May 1, 2003

All 60 seats to Lancaster City Council 31 seats needed for a majority

	First party	Second party	Third party
Party	Labour	MB Independent	Conservative
Seats before	17	25	8
Seats won	20	11	10
Seat change	▲3	▼11	▲2
Popular vote	8,821	4,303	9,301
Percentage	24.35%	11.88%	25.68%
	Fourth party	Fifth party
Party	Liberal Democrats	Green
Seats before	6	5
Seats won	8	7
Seat change	▲2	▲2
Popular vote	4,434	5,848
Percentage	12.24%	16.15%
Leader before election
Tricia Heath
Morecambe Bay Independents
No overall control
Elected Leader
Ian Barker
Labour
No overall control

Elections to Lancaster City Council took place on 1 May 2003. The whole council was up for election and it remained in No Overall Control.

Following the election, the composition of the council was as follows:

Party	Seats	±
Labour	20	+3
Morecambe Bay Independents	11	-11
Conservative	10	+2
Liberal Democrat	8	+2
Green	7	+2
Independent	4	+1

== Election result ==
2003 Lancaster City Council
Party	Seats	Gains	Losses	Net gain/loss	Seats %	Votes %	Votes	+/−
Labour	20	3		▲3	33.33	24.35	8,821	
MB Independent	11		11	▼11	18.33	11.88	4,303	
Conservative	10	2		▲2	16.67	25.68	9,301	
Liberal Democrats	8	2		▲2	13.33	12.24	4,434	
Green	7	2		▲2	11.67	16.15	5,848	
Independent	4	1		▲1	6.67	12.63	4,573	
UKIP	0	0	0	±0	0.00	0.52	187	
Socialist Alliance	0	0	0	±0	0.00	0.51	183	
Turnout						36	36,220	

== Ward results ==
=== Bare ===
Bare (2 councillors)
Party	Candidate	Votes	%	±%
Conservative	John Fretwell	606	28.56	
Conservative	Susan Bray	468	22.05	
MB Independent	June Ashworth	464	21.87	
MB Independent	David Bottoms	301	14.19	
Labour	Steven Ormerod	198	9.33	
Green	Ralph Martyn	85	4.01	
Turnout				

=== Bolton-Le-Sands ===
Bolton-Le-Sands (2 councillors)
Party	Candidate	Votes	%	±%
Independent	Keith Budden	377	35.20	
Conservative	Anthony Johnson	287	26.80	
Independent	Arthur Briggs	253	23.62	
Green	Avril Moncaster	154	14.38	
Turnout				

=== Bulk ===
Bulk (3 councillors)
Party	Candidate	Votes	%	±%
Labour	Ian Barker	785	17.53	
Labour	Abbott Bryning	705	15.74	
Green	John Whitelegg	667	14.90	
Green	Susan Paylor	638	14.25	
Labour	Ronald Kershaw	630	14.07	
Green	Susanna Holden	580	12.95	
Liberal Democrats	Thomas Barney	212	4.73	
Independent	Colin Lennon	110	2.46	
Independent	Andrew McNae	83	1.85	
Independent	Mark Nixon	68	1.52	
Turnout				

=== Carnforth ===
Carnforth (2 councillors)
Party	Candidate	Votes	%	±%
Labour	Edna Jones	364	26.40	
Labour	Paul Gardner	297	21.54	
Independent	Robert Roe	285	20.67	
UKIP	Gregory Beaman	187	13.56	
Conservative	Kim Battersby-Hill	184	13.34	
Green	Stephen Hoyland	62	4.50	
Turnout				

=== Castle ===
Castle (3 councillors)
Party	Candidate	Votes	%	±%
Green	Jon Barry	1,255	23.42	
Green	Anne Chapman	1,124	20.97	
Green	Chris Coates	1,039	19.39	
Labour	Michael Gibson	458	8.55	
Labour	Linda Piggott	432	8.06	
Labour	James Groves	425	7.93	
Conservative	Richard Royal	251	4.68	
Liberal Democrats	Caroline Wilton	209	3.90	
Independent	Mark Eldon	166	3.10	
Turnout				

=== Duke's ===
Duke's (1 councillor)
Party	Candidate	Votes	%	±%
Green	Gina Dowding	328	58.99	
Independent	John Jacobs	79	14.21	
Labour	Paeder Broe	71	12.77	
Liberal Democrats	Rebecca Livesley	51	9.17	
Conservative	Michael Jackson	27	4.86	
Majority		249	44.78	
Turnout		556		

=== Ellel ===
Ellel (2 councillors)
Party	Candidate	Votes	%	±%
Conservative	Helen Helme	746	33.39	
Conservative	Susan Charles	647	28.96	
Labour	Claire Davison	268	12.00	
Liberal Democrats	James Talbot	267	11.95	
Green	Tony Pinkney	168	7.52	
Green	Pamela Whire	138	6.18	
Turnout				

=== Halton-with-Aughton ===
Halton-with-Aughton (1 councillor)
Party	Candidate	Votes	%	±%
Independent	Paul Woodruff	606	79.63	
Conservative	Clive Richardson	95	12.48	
Green	Cherith Adams	60	7.88	
Majority		511	67.15	
Turnout		761		

=== Harbour ===
Harbour (3 councillors)
Party	Candidate	Votes	%	±%
Labour	Janice Hanson	585	17.99	
Labour	Peter Robinson	558	17.16	
Labour	David Whitaker	526	16.17	
MB Independent	John Barnes	445	13.68	
MB Independent	Christine Stebbing	404	12.42	
MB Independent	Christopher Greenall	373	11.47	
Conservative	Kenneth Brown	267	8.21	
Green	Michael Holland	94	2.89	
Turnout				

=== Heysham Central ===
Heysham Central (2 councillors)
Party	Candidate	Votes	%	±%
Independent	Joyce Taylor	610	37.24	
MB Independent	Geoffrey Knight	394	24.05	
Labour	Jean Yates	288	17.58	
Conservative	John Battersby-Hill	276	16.85	
Green	Lucy Birbeck	70	4.27	
Turnout				

=== Heysham North ===
Heysham North (2 councillors)
Party	Candidate	Votes	%	±%
Labour	Tina Clifford	369	23.53	
Labour	Ronald Sands	346	22.07	
MB Independent	Mavis Newton	281	17.92	
MB Independent	Brenda Emmerson	272	17.35	
Conservative	Brian Pearson	242	15.43	
Green	Ian McCulloch	58	3.70	
Turnout				

=== Heysham South ===
Heysham South (3 councillors)
Party	Candidate	Votes	%	±%
MB Independent	Michael Greenall	633	19.92	
MB Independent	Philip Lee	553	17.40	
MB Independent	Shirley Reid	542	17.05	
Labour	Darren Clifford	454	14.29	
Labour	Alan Biddulph	448	14.10	
Labour	Terrie Mercalfe	365	11.49	
Green	Elaine Lewis	183	5.76	
Turnout				

=== John O'Gaunt ===
John O'Gaunt (3 councillors)
Party	Candidate	Votes	%	±%
Labour	Mary Blamire	824	19.89	
Labour	Joseph Ravetz	672	16.22	
Labour	Gareth Millar	671	16.20	
Conservative	Jane Parkinson	346	8.35	
Liberal Democrats	Elizabeth Arnott	333	8.04	
Green	Chris Hart	279	6.73	
Green	Jonathan Mills	259	6.25	
Green	Gisela Renolds	244	5.89	
Conservative	Matthew Sephton	229	5.53	
Independent	Kerry Mason	135	3.26	
Independent	Stephen Johnson	78	1.88	
Independent	James Gill	73	1.76	
Turnout				

=== Kellet ===
Kellet (1 councillor)
Party	Candidate	Votes	%	±%
Conservative	John Mace	503	60.82	
Independent	Geoffrey Ford	268	32.41	
Green	Adrian Mackenzie	56	6.77	
Majority		235	28.42	
Turnout		827		

=== Lower Lune Valley ===
Lower Lune Valley (2 councillors)
Party	Candidate	Votes	%	±%
Liberal Democrats	Patricia Quinton	725	23.96	
Liberal Democrats	Joyce Pritchard	683	22.57	
Conservative	George Platts	651	21.51	
Conservative	Frederick McGlade	576	19.04	
Labour	Raymond Hill	107	3.54	
Green	Lucy Hampson	98	3.24	
Labour	Richard Newman-Thompson	93	3.07	
Green	Bronwyn Newton	93	3.07	
Turnout				

=== Overton ===
Overton (1 councillor)
Party	Candidate	Votes	%	±%
MB Independent	Mort Allan	243	41.26	
Independent	Susan Ayrey	161	27.33	
Conservative	Keith Sowden	160	27.16	
Green	Harriet Orr	25	4.24	
Majority		82	13.92	
Turnout		589		

=== Poulton ===
Poulton (3 councillors)
Party	Candidate	Votes	%	±%
MB Independent	Evelyn Archer	568	16.99	
MB Independent	Shirley Burns	538	16.09	
Labour	Rebekah Gerrard	521	15.58	
Labour	Beryl Spelling	458	13.70	
MB Independent	Patricia Heath	447	13.37	
Labour	Richard Martin	438	13.10	
Conservative	Jane Brown	231	6.91	
Green	Simone Novello	113	3.38	
Turnout				

=== Scotforth East ===
Scotforth East (2 councillors)
Party	Candidate	Votes	%	±%
Liberal Democrats	John Gilbert	757	29.81	
Liberal Democrats	Janie Kirkman	754	29.70	
Labour	Richard Mankoff	312	12.29	
Conservative	Derek Sykes	289	11.38	
Conservative	Joan Jackson	277	10.91	
Green	Abigail Mills	84	3.31	
Independent	Andrew Byrne	33	1.30	
Independent	Michael Entwistle	33	1.30	
Turnout				

=== Scotforth West ===
Scotforth West (3 councillors)
Party	Candidate	Votes	%	±%
Labour	Shiela Denwood	820	14.87	
Green	Emily Heath	749	13.58	
Green	Catriona Stamp	612	11.10	
Green	Mark Rotherham	491	8.90	
Conservative	Val Outram	431	7.82	
Labour	Gwynneth Robertson	420	7.62	
Labour	Robin Pettitt	418	7.58	
Conservative	Robert Chard	403	7.31	
Conservative	Graham Warnock	360	6.52	
Independent	Jan Pacula	224	4.06	
Independent	Peter Corke	211	3.83	
Liberal Democrats	Charles Morrow	195	3.54	
Independent	Susinne Mason	180	3.26	
Turnout				

=== Silverdale ===
Silverdale (1 councillor)
Party	Candidate	Votes	%	±%
Conservative	Sarah Fishwick	499	56.64	
Independent	Peter Roberts	281	31.90	
Green	Amanda Bingley	101	11.64	
Majority		218	21.74	
Turnout		881		

=== Skerton East ===
Skerton East (3 councillors)
Party	Candidate	Votes	%	±%
Labour	John Harrison	600	22.68	
Labour	Charles Grattan	588	22.22	
Labour	Robert Redfern	489	18.48	
Independent	Roger Dennison	318	12.02	
Green	Ashley Toms	234	8.84	
Conservative	Jean Holland	233	8.81	
Green	Robert Poole	184	6.95	
Turnout				

=== Skerton West ===
Skerton West (3 councillors)
Party	Candidate	Votes	%	±%
Labour	Janet Horner	657	21.06	
Labour	Jean Jones	645	20.68	
Labour	Roger Sherlock	594	19.04	
Conservative	John Airey	297	9.52	
Independent	William Harrison	265	8.50	
Independent	Stephen Pughsley	242	7.76	
Socialist Alliance	Thomas Penney	183	5.87	
Green	Dominic Harrison	127	4.07	
Green	Stephen Dickinson	109	3.49	
Turnout				

=== Slyne-with-Hest ===
Slyne-with-Hest (2 councillors)
Party	Candidate	Votes	%	±%
Conservative	Sylvia Rogerson	801	32.92	
Conservative	James Thomas	770	31.65	
Independent	Frank Briggs-Allen	358	14.71	
Independent	Mark Stuart-Burgess	324	13.32	
Green	Mark Westcombe	180	7.40	
Turnout				

=== Torrisholme ===
Torrisholme (3 councillors)
Party	Candidate	Votes	%	±%
Liberal Democrats	Ronald Day	1,098	22.04	
MB Independent	Evelyn Ashworth	656	13.17	
Liberal Democrats	Ian Clift	630	12.65	
Conservative	Gordon Hagel	624	12.53	
Conservative	Caroline Airey	592	11.88	
Labour	Richard Grave	460	9.23	
MB Independent	David Barker	429	8.61	
Labour	Michael Varey	316	6.34	
Green	Cathryn Morton	177	3.55	
Turnout				

=== University ===
University (2 councillors)
Party	Candidate	Votes	%	±%
Liberal Democrats	Stuart Langhorn	308	24.29	
Liberal Democrats	Alexander Stone	251	19.79	
Green	Patricia McGrath	227	17.90	
Labour	Claire Johnson	209	16.48	
Green	Graham Hunt	160	12.62	
Conservative	Dewi Williams	113	8.91	
Turnout				

=== Upper Lune Valley ===
Upper Lune Valley (1 councillor)
Party	Candidate	Votes	%	±%
Conservative	James Airey	653	70.06	
Liberal Democrats	David Mason	279	29.94	
Majority		374	40.13	
Turnout		932		

=== Warton ===
Warton (1 councillor)
Party	Candidate	Votes	%	±%
Independent	Jean Dent	297	51.38	
Conservative	Graham Agnew	192	33.22	
Green	Paul Harvey	89	15.40	
Majority		105	18.17	
Turnout		578		

=== Westgate ===
Westgate (3 councillors)
Party	Candidate	Votes	%	±%
MB Independent	David Kerr	619	23.02	
MB Independent	Anthony Wade	601	22.35	
MB Independent	Geoffrey Wilson	576	21.42	
Labour	Albert Thornton	471	17.52	
Conservative	Dorothy Mingins	297	11.04	
Green	Richard Twine	125	4.65	
Turnout				
