= 2007 Lancaster City Council election =

2007 UK local government election

Elections to Lancaster City Council took place on 3 May 2007. The whole council was up for election and in remained in No Overall Control with Labour and the Liberal Democrats losing seats to the Greens and Conservatives.

Following the election, the composition of the council was as follows:

| Party | Seats | ± |
|---|---|---|
| Labour | 15 | -5 |
| Conservative | 12 | +2 |
| Green | 12 | +5 |
| Morecambe Bay Independents | 11 | 0 |
| Liberal Democrat | 5 | -3 |
| Independent | 5 | +1 |

== Election result ==
Lancaster Council Election Result 2007
| Party | Seats | Gains | Losses | Net gain/loss | Seats % | Votes % | Votes | +/− |
|---|---|---|---|---|---|---|---|---|
| Labour | 15 | 0 | 5 | –5 | 25.00 | 25.91 | 21,306 | +1.56 |
| Conservative | 12 | 3 | 1 | +2 | 20.00 | 29.96 | 24,643 | +4.28 |
| Green | 12 | 5 | 0 | +5 | 20.00 | 18.47 | 15,189 | +2.32 |
| MB Independent | 11 | 2 | 2 | ±0 | 18.33 | 12.79 | 10,521 | +0.91 |
| Liberal Democrats | 5 | 0 | 3 | –3 | 8.33 | 7.98 | 6,559 | -4.26 |
| Independent | 5 | 1 | 0 | +1 | 8.33 | 3.98 | 3,274 | -8.65 |
| UKIP | 0 | 0 | 0 | ±0 | 0.00 | 0.55 | 455 | +0.03 |
| BNP | 0 | 0 | 0 | ±0 | 0.00 | 0.36 | 297 | +0.36 |
| Turnout | | | | | | 36 | 36,220 | |

== Ward results ==
=== Bare ===
Bare (2 councillors)
| Party | Candidate | Votes | % | ±% |
|---|---|---|---|---|
| Conservative | Susan Bray | 546 | 20.48 | −1.57 |
| MB Independent | June Irene Ashworth | 494 | 18.53 | −3.34 |
| Conservative | Graham Marsh | 452 | 16.95 | −11.61 |
| MB Independent | Tricia Heath | 397 | 14.89 | +0.70 |
| Liberal Democrats | Michael Gradwell | 335 | 12.57 | +12.57 |
| Labour | Andrew Mark Berry | 201 | 7.54 | −1.79 |
| Labour | Ian Carey Hilton | 153 | 5.74 | +5.74 |
| Green | Pat Salkeld | 88 | 3.30 | −0.71 |
| Turnout | | 1,387 | | |
| Conservative hold | | Swing | | |
| MB Independent gain from Conservative | | Swing | | |

=== Bolton-Le-Sands ===
Bolton-Le-Sands (2 councillors)
| Party | Candidate | Votes | % | ±% |
|---|---|---|---|---|
| Independent | Keith Budden | 685 | 27.90 | −7.30 |
| Conservative | Val Histed | 649 | 26.44 | −0.36 |
| Conservative | Neil Kerr | 427 | 17.39 | +17.39 |
| Labour | Richard William Martin | 273 | 11.12 | +11.12 |
| Green | Avril Moncaster | 225 | 9.16 | −5.22 |
| Labour | John Robert Reynolds | 196 | 7.98 | +7.98 |
| Turnout | | 1,331 | 38 | |
| Independent hold | | Swing | | |
| Conservative hold | | Swing | | |

=== Bulk ===
Bulk (3 councillors)
| Party | Candidate | Votes | % | ±% |
|---|---|---|---|---|
| Green | John Whitelegg | 1,017 | 19.52 | +4.62 |
| Green | Maia Whitelegg | 890 | 17.09 | +2.84 |
| Green | Andrew Martin Kay | 884 | 16.97 | +4.02 |
| Labour | Ian Stewart Barker | 728 | 13.98 | −3.55 |
| Labour | Sue Clark | 686 | 13.17 | −2.57 |
| Labour | Dan Hogan | 584 | 11.21 | −2.86 |
| Conservative | Sean James Edwards | 215 | 4.13 | +4.13 |
| Conservative | Andrew Jonathen Saywell | 205 | 3.94 | +3.94 |
| Turnout | | 1,946 | 39 | |
| Green gain from Labour | | Swing | | |
| Green gain from Labour | | Swing | | |
| Green hold | | Swing | | |

=== Carnforth ===
Carnforth (2 councillors)
| Party | Candidate | Votes | % | ±% |
|---|---|---|---|---|
| Conservative | Tony Johnson | 471 | 27.85 | +14.51 |
| Independent | Bob Roe | 381 | 22.53 | +1.86 |
| Labour | Judith Anne Jones | 320 | 18.92 | −7.48 |
| Labour | Paul Malcolm Gardner | 304 | 17.98 | −3.56 |
| UKIP | Gregg Beaman | 215 | 12.71 | −0.85 |
| Turnout | | 1,014 | 30 | |
| Conservative gain from Labour | | Swing | | |
| Independent gain from Labour | | Swing | | |

=== Castle ===
Castle (3 councillors)
| Party | Candidate | Votes | % | ±% |
|---|---|---|---|---|
| Green | Jon Barry | 1,485 | 23.34 | −0.08 |
| Green | Chris Coates | 1,270 | 19.96 | +0.57 |
| Green | Catriona Stamp | 1,184 | 18.61 | −2.36 |
| Labour | Michael John Gibson | 417 | 6.55 | −2.00 |
| Labour | Linda Ann Piggott | 392 | 6.16 | −1.90 |
| Labour | Lynne Burnside Stafford | 375 | 5.89 | −2.04 |
| Conservative | Jonathan William James Hazzlewood | 356 | 5.59 | +0.91 |
| Conservative | Matthew Plested | 320 | 5.03 | +5.03 |
| Conservative | Christian Jonathan Wakeford | 280 | 4.40 | +4.40 |
| Liberal Democrats | Rebecca Livesley | 200 | 3.14 | −0.76 |
| UKIP | Nigel Brown | 84 | 1.32 | +1.32 |
| Turnout | | 2,222 | 42 | |
| Green hold | | Swing | | |
| Green hold | | Swing | | |
| Green hold | | Swing | | |

=== Duke's ===
Duke's (1 councillor)
| Party | Candidate | Votes | % | ±% |
|---|---|---|---|---|
| Green | Anne Chapman | 348 | 67.02 | +8.03 |
| Labour | Robin Thomas Pettitt | 112 | 19.86 | +7.09 |
| Conservative | Miles Hillcoate Bennington | 104 | 18.44 | +13.58 |
| Majority | | 236 | 41.84 | −2.94 |
| Turnout | | 572 | 30 | |
| Green hold | | Swing | | |

=== Ellel ===
Ellel (2 councillors)
| Party | Candidate | Votes | % | ±% |
|---|---|---|---|---|
| Conservative | Helen Helme | 991 | 33.03 | −0.36 |
| Conservative | Susie Charles | 909 | 30.30 | +1.34 |
| Liberal Democrats | Mike Nicholson | 289 | 9.63 | −2.32 |
| Labour | Sarah Harrison | 283 | 9.43 | −2.57 |
| Liberal Democrats | Tom Horn | 282 | 9.40 | +9.40 |
| Green | Richard Wyatt | 282 | 9.40 | +1.88 |
| Labour | Darren Keith Neesam | 246 | 8.20 | +8.20 |
| Turnout | | 1,757 | 33 | |
| Conservative hold | | Swing | | |
| Conservative hold | | Swing | | |

=== Halton-with-Aughton ===
Halton-with-Aughton (1 councillor)
| Party | Candidate | Votes | % | ±% |
|---|---|---|---|---|
| Independent | Paul Woodruff | 513 | 54.93 | −24.7 |
| Conservative | Brian Jefferson | 367 | 39.29 | +26.81 |
| Green | Cherith Adams | 54 | 5.78 | −2.10 |
| Majority | | 146 | 15.63 | −51.52 |
| Turnout | | 938 | 51 | |
| Independent hold | | Swing | | |

=== Harbour ===
Harbour (3 councillors)
| Party | Candidate | Votes | % | ±% |
|---|---|---|---|---|
| Labour | Janice Hanson | 531 | 14.13 | −3.86 |
| MB Independent | John Edward Norton Barnes | 505 | 13.43 | −0.25 |
| Labour | Peter Robinson | 492 | 13.09 | −4.07 |
| Labour | David Whitaker | 472 | 12.56 | −3.61 |
| MB Independent | David Farrow | 463 | 12.32 | +0.85 |
| MB Independent | Christine Stebbing | 429 | 11.41 | −1.01 |
| Conservative | Michael Bolton | 296 | 7.87 | −0.34 |
| Conservative | Jane Brown | 252 | 6.70 | +6.70 |
| Conservative | Judith Bentham | 230 | 6.12 | +6.12 |
| Green | Stephen Dickinson | 89 | 2.37 | −0.52 |
| Turnout | | 1,329 | 29 | |
| Labour hold | | Swing | | |
| MB Independent gain from Labour | | Swing | | |
| Labour hold | | Swing | | |

=== Heysham Central ===
Heysham Central (2 councillors)
| Party | Candidate | Votes | % | ±% |
|---|---|---|---|---|
| Independent | Joyce Taylor | 766 | 35.74 | −1.50 |
| MB Independent | Geoff Knight | 508 | 23.71 | −0.34 |
| Conservative | Pat Hibbins | 402 | 18.76 | +1.91 |
| Labour | Jean Elizabeth Yates | 347 | 16.19 | −1.39 |
| Green | Melanie Forrest | 120 | 5.60 | +1.33 |
| Turnout | | 1,298 | 37 | |
| Independent hold | | Swing | | |
| MB Independent hold | | Swing | | |

=== Heysham North ===
Heysham North (2 councilors)
| Party | Candidate | Votes | % | ±% |
|---|---|---|---|---|
| Labour | Ron Sands | 367 | 20.25 | −1.82 |
| Labour | Tina Louise Clifford | 353 | 19.48 | −4.05 |
| MB Independent | Brian Moore | 313 | 17.27 | −0.65 |
| MB Independent | Laura Wolfenden | 312 | 17.22 | −0.13 |
| Conservative | Debbie Buck | 199 | 10.98 | −4.45 |
| Conservative | John Calvert | 169 | 9.33 | +9.33 |
| Green | Michael Hallam | 99 | 5.46 | +1.76 |
| Turnout | | 954 | 26 | |
| Labour hold | | Swing | | |
| Labour hold | | Swing | | |

=== Heysham South ===
Heysham South (3 councillors)
| Party | Candidate | Votes | % | ±% |
|---|---|---|---|---|
| Conservative | Ken Brown | 855 | 22.51 | +22.51 |
| MB Independent | Mike Greenall | 704 | 18.53 | −1.39 |
| MB Independent | Keran Farrow | 520 | 13.69 | −3.71 |
| MB Independent | Brian Barmby | 500 | 13.16 | −3.89 |
| Labour | Darren Keith Clifford | 461 | 12.13 | −2.16 |
| Labour | Alan Biddulph | 438 | 11.53 | −2.57 |
| Labour | Gareth Maurice Weston Webb | 321 | 8.45 | −3.04 |
| Turnout | | 1,649 | 32 | |
| Conservative gain from MB Independent | | Swing | | |
| MB Independent hold | | Swing | | |
| MB Independent hold | | Swing | | |

=== John O'Gaunt ===
John O'Gaunt (3 councillors)
| Party | Candidate | Votes | % | ±% |
|---|---|---|---|---|
| Labour | Jim Blakely | 776 | 14.79 | −5.10 |
| Labour | Eileen Blamire | 728 | 13.87 | −2.35 |
| Green | Jude Towers | 722 | 13.76 | +7.03 |
| Green | Tom Roberts | 645 | 12.29 | +6.04 |
| Labour | Janet Mary Richardson | 608 | 11.59 | −4.61 |
| Green | Mark Westcombe | 537 | 10.23 | +4.34 |
| Conservative | Steven John Chadwick | 438 | 8.35 | +0.00 |
| Conservative | Joan Parkinson Jackson | 417 | 7.95 | +2.42 |
| Conservative | Victoria Joy Roberts | 377 | 7.18 | +7.18 |
| Turnout | | 1,853 | 32 | |
| Labour hold | | Swing | | |
| Labour hold | | Swing | | |
| Green gain from Labour | | Swing | | |

=== Kellet ===
Kellet (1 councillor)
| Party | Candidate | Votes | % | ±% |
|---|---|---|---|---|
| Conservative | Roger Mace | 703 | 79.08 | +18.26 |
| Green | Ralph Martyn | 98 | 11.02 | +4.25 |
| Labour | Miriam Paula Blakely | 88 | 9.90 | +9.90 |
| Majority | | 605 | 68.05 | +39.63 |
| Turnout | | 891 | 51 | |
| Conservative hold | | Swing | | |

=== Lower Lune Valley ===
Lower Lune Valley (2 councillors)
| Party | Candidate | Votes | % | ±% |
|---|---|---|---|---|
| Liberal Democrats | Joyce Pritchard | 815 | 23.06 | +0.49 |
| Liberal Democrats | Stuart Langhorn | 785 | 22.21 | −1.75 |
| Conservative | Andrew John Kidd | 762 | 21.56 | +0.05 |
| Conservative | Jane Parkinson | 683 | 19.33 | +0.29 |
| UKIP | Fred McGlade | 145 | 4.10 | +4.10 |
| Green | Benjamin Ruth | 133 | 3.76 | +0.52 |
| Labour | Jeremy Hugh Bateman | 118 | 3.34 | +0.10 |
| Labour | Tom David Watts | 93 | 2.63 | −0.44 |
| Turnout | | 1,866 | 52 | |
| Liberal Democrats hold | | Swing | | |
| Liberal Democrats hold | | Swing | | |

=== Overton ===
Overton (1 councillor)
| Party | Candidate | Votes | % | ±% |
|---|---|---|---|---|
| Conservative | Keith Sowden | 265 | 37.32 | +10.16 |
| MB Independent | Don Fairhurst | 236 | 33.24 | −8.02 |
| Labour | Ian Pattison | 169 | 23.80 | +23.80 |
| Green | Sue Holden | 40 | 5.63 | +1.39 |
| Majority | | 29 | 4.08 | |
| Turnout | | 711 | 37 | |
| Conservative gain from MB Independent | | Swing | | |

=== Poulton ===
Poulton (3 councillors)
| Party | Candidate | Votes | % | ±% |
|---|---|---|---|---|
| MB Independent | Evelyn Archer | 658 | 15.63 | −1.36 |
| MB Independent | Shirley Burns | 612 | 14.53 | −1.56 |
| Labour | Rebekah Gerrard | 501 | 11.90 | −3.68 |
| MB Independent | Geoff Walker | 468 | 11.11 | −2.26 |
| Labour | Beryl Spelling | 407 | 9.67 | −4.03 |
| Labour | Richard Ross Grave | 370 | 8.79 | −4.31 |
| Conservative | Jon Bradshaw | 369 | 8.76 | +1.85 |
| Conservative | Jim Catterall | 367 | 8.72 | +8.72 |
| Conservative | Andrew Watson | 333 | 7.91 | +7.91 |
| Green | Adrian Bruce MacKenzie | 126 | 2.99 | −0.39 |
| Turnout | | 1,488 | 28 | |
| MB Independent hold | | Swing | | |
| MB Independent hold | | Swing | | |
| Labour hold | | Swing | | |

=== Scotforth East ===
Scotforth East (2 councillors)
| Party | Candidate | Votes | % | ±% |
|---|---|---|---|---|
| Liberal Democrats | Janie Kirkman | 637 | 22.76 | −6.94 |
| Liberal Democrats | John Gilbert | 589 | 21.04 | −8.77 |
| Conservative | Billy Hill | 446 | 15.93 | +4.55 |
| Conservative | Charlotte Elizabeth Paterson | 421 | 15.04 | +4.13 |
| Labour | Pam Pickles | 287 | 10.25 | −2.04 |
| Labour | Stanley Henig | 253 | 9.04 | +9.04 |
| Green | Abi Mills | 166 | 5.93 | −0.20 |
| Turnout | | 1,485 | 44 | |
| Liberal Democrats hold | | Swing | | |
| Liberal Democrats hold | | Swing | | |

=== Scotforth West ===
Scotforth West (3 councillors)
| Party | Candidate | Votes | % | ±% |
|---|---|---|---|---|
| Green | Emily Heath | 1,016 | 16.59 | +2.93 |
| Labour | Shiela Denwood | 854 | 13.94 | −0.93 |
| Green | Jane Fletcher | 787 | 12.85 | +1.75 |
| Green | Jonathan David Mills | 677 | 11.05 | +2.15 |
| Conservative | Val Outram | 627 | 10.24 | +2.42 |
| Conservative | James Bird | 587 | 9.59 | +2.28 |
| Conservative | Tom Currie | 577 | 9.42 | +2.90 |
| Labour | Bob Clark | 515 | 8.41 | +0.79 |
| Labour | Ronnie Kershaw | 484 | 7.90 | +0.32 |
| Turnout | | 2,134 | 43 | |
| Green hold | | Swing | | |
| Labour hold | | Swing | | |
| Green hold | | Swing | | |

=== Silverdale ===
Silverdale (1 councillor)
| Party | Candidate | Votes | % | ±% |
|---|---|---|---|---|
| Conservative | Sarah Fishwick | 660 | 73.01 | +16.37 |
| Green | Amanda Bingley | 153 | 16.92 | +5.28 |
| Labour | Rachel Margaret Timmins | 91 | 10.06 | +10.06 |
| Majority | | 507 | 56.08 | +34.34 |
| Turnout | | 905 | 54 | |
| Conservative hold | | Swing | | |

=== Skerton East ===
Skerton East (3 councillors)
| Party | Candidate | Votes | % | ±% |
|---|---|---|---|---|
| Labour | Charles Grattan | 680 | 16.88 | −5.80 |
| Labour | Abbott Bryning | 609 | 15.12 | −7.10 |
| Labour | Robert Redfern | 597 | 14.82 | −3.66 |
| Conservative | Stuart Bateson | 339 | 8.41 | −0.40 |
| Conservative | Margo Airey | 332 | 8.24 | +8.24 |
| Green | Ashley Keith Toms | 317 | 7.87 | −0.97 |
| Independent | Mick Varey | 272 | 6.75 | +6.75 |
| Conservative | Geoff Marsden | 259 | 6.43 | +6.43 |
| Independent | Norman Gardner | 214 | 5.31 | +5.31 |
| Green | Mark Rotherham | 213 | 5.29 | −1.66 |
| Green | Tony Pinkney | 197 | 4.89 | +4.89 |
| Turnout | | 1,397 | 28 | |
| Labour hold | | Swing | | |
| Labour hold | | Swing | | |
| Labour hold | | Swing | | |

=== Skerton West ===
Skerton West (3 councillors)
| Party | Candidate | Votes | % | ±% |
|---|---|---|---|---|
| Labour | Karen Leytham | 721 | 24.35 | +3.29 |
| Labour | Roger Sherlock | 655 | 22.12 | +3.08 |
| Labour | Robert Smith | 655 | 22.12 | +1.44 |
| Conservative | Dave Airey | 350 | 11.82 | +11.82 |
| Conservative | John Airey | 350 | 11.82 | +2.30 |
| Conservative | Paul Ireton | 315 | 10.64 | +10.64 |
| BNP | Chris Hill | 297 | 10.03 | +10.03 |
| Green | David Richard Horton | 273 | 9.22 | +5.15 |
| Turnout | | 1,399 | 29 | |
| Labour hold | | Swing | | |
| Labour hold | | Swing | | |
| Labour hold | | Swing | | |

=== Slyne-with-Hest ===
Slyne-with-Hest (2 councillors)
| Party | Candidate | Votes | % | ±% |
|---|---|---|---|---|
| Conservative | Sylvia Rogerson | 1,061 | 39.60 | +6.68 |
| Conservative | Malcolm Thomas | 1,050 | 39.19 | +7.54 |
| Green | Barry Gwyn Hankin | 295 | 11.01 | +3.61 |
| Labour | Daniel David Gray | 273 | 10.19 | +10.19 |
| Turnout | | 1,516 | 44 | |
| Conservative hold | | Swing | | |
| Conservative hold | | Swing | | |

=== Torrisholme ===
Torrisholme (3 councillors)
| Party | Candidate | Votes | % | ±% |
|---|---|---|---|---|
| Liberal Democrats | John Day | 894 | 14.11 | −7.93 |
| MB Independent | Roger Dennison | 709 | 11.19 | −1.98 |
| MB Independent | Geoff Marsland | 657 | 10.37 | +1.76 |
| MB Independent | Joe Sowerby | 645 | 10.18 | +10.18 |
| Conservative | Dorothy Mingins | 606 | 9.57 | −2.96 |
| Conservative | Peter Espley | 595 | 9.39 | −2.49 |
| Liberal Democrats | Ian Clift | 595 | 9.39 | −3.26 |
| Conservative | Richard Rollins | 572 | 9.03 | +9.03 |
| Liberal Democrats | Dave Mason | 487 | 7.69 | +7.69 |
| Labour | Peter Senior | 349 | 5.51 | −3.72 |
| Green | Marvin Peake | 225 | 3.55 | +0.00 |
| Turnout | | 2,291 | 40 | |
| Liberal Democrats hold | | Swing | | |
| MB Independent hold | | Swing | | |
| MB Independent gain from Liberal Democrats | | Swing | | |

=== University ===
University (2 councillors)
| Party | Candidate | Votes | % | ±% |
|---|---|---|---|---|
| Green | Ian David McCulloch | 173 | 18.91 | +1.01 |
| Green | Morgwn Trollinger | 151 | 16.50 | +3.88 |
| Liberal Democrats | Ryan Bate | 111 | 12.13 | −12.16 |
| Liberal Democrats | Gavin Barrass | 106 | 11.58 | −8.21 |
| Labour | Cat Smith | 98 | 10.71 | −5.77 |
| Conservative | Alex Law | 97 | 10.60 | +1.69 |
| Conservative | David Jonathan Bonner | 86 | 9.40 | +9.40 |
| Labour | James Stuart Groves | 82 | 8.96 | +8.96 |
| UKIP | William Taylor Windle Potts | 11 | 1.20 | +1.20 |
| Turnout | | 471 | 13 | |
| Green gain from Liberal Democrats | | Swing | | |
| Green gain from Liberal Democrats | | Swing | | |

=== Upper Lune Valley ===
Upper Lune Valley (1 councillor)
| Party | Candidate | Votes | % | ±% |
|---|---|---|---|---|
| Conservative | Peter Thomas Williamson | 776 | 78.70 | +8.64 |
| Green | Gisela Christine Renolds | 210 | 21.30 | +21.30 |
| Majority | | 566 | 57.40 | +17.27 |
| Turnout | | 992 | 52 | |
| Conservative hold | | Swing | | |

=== Warton ===
Warton (1 councillor)
| Party | Candidate | Votes | % | ±% |
|---|---|---|---|---|
| Independent | Jean Dent | 443 | 59.54 | +8.16 |
| Conservative | Andrea Johnson | 301 | 40.46 | +7.24 |
| Majority | | 142 | 19.09 | +4.5 |
| Turnout | | 743 | 39 | |
| Independent hold | | Swing | | |

=== Westgate ===
Westgate (3 councillors)
| Party | Candidate | Votes | % | ±% |
|---|---|---|---|---|
| MB Independent | David Kerr | 656 | 15.08 | −7.94 |
| MB Independent | Tony Wade | 628 | 14.44 | −7.91 |
| MB Independent | Roger Plumb | 612 | 14.07 | −7.35 |
| Labour | Albert Hayden Thornton | 409 | 9.40 | −8.12 |
| Labour | Dan Ratcliffe | 394 | 9.06 | +9.06 |
| Labour | Ben Singleton | 390 | 8.97 | +8.97 |
| Conservative | Julie Race | 292 | 6.71 | −4.33 |
| Conservative | Tony Jones | 272 | 6.25 | +6.25 |
| Conservative | Chris Leadbetter | 263 | 6.05 | +6.05 |
| Liberal Democrats | Margaret Riley | 229 | 5.26 | +5.26 |
| Liberal Democrats | William Edward Riley | 205 | 4.71 | +4.71 |
| Turnout | | 1,547 | 30 | |
| MB Independent hold | | Swing | | |
| MB Independent hold | | Swing | | |
| MB Independent hold | | Swing | | |
