= Morecambe Bay Independents =

- Leader: Geoff Knight
- Founded: 1987
- Headquarters: Morecambe
- Slogan: People before politics
- Lancaster City Council: 3 / 61
- Morecambe Town Council: 14 / 26

Website
- mbi.org.uk

The Morecambe Bay Independents (MBIs) is a local political party in Morecambe, Lancashire. The group ran Lancaster City Council from 1999 to 2003, and successfully campaigned in 2005 for the creation of Morecambe Town Council.

== History ==
=== Early years (1987–1999) ===
After being founded in 1987, the party won 13 seats on Lancaster City Council in May 1992. They selected Mark Turner for the Morecambe and Lunesdale seat in the general election, receiving 916 votes (2.1%). A former MBI councillor, Kathleen Egerton, was shot dead by her husband in a murder-suicide in 1995. After a by-election victory and a defection by former mayor Shirley Burns from the Conservatives in May 1998, they became the official opposition on the council.

=== MBIs in power (1999–2003) ===
They gained power on Lancaster City Council in 1999 when they more than doubled their seats to 22, sitting as a minority administration, with Conservative, Liberal Democrat and Green councillors in the cabinet. The Labour Party refused to sit in cabinet. In July 2001, Cllr John Fretwell, defected to the Conservatives. The then-leader of the MBI, Cllr Tricia Heath, was leader of Lancaster City Council for four years. However in May 2003 she lost her council seat; as such, the MBIs' total number of seats fell from 16 to 11. Heath placed some of the blame for her loss on the District Auditor's report on "Blobbygate", a scandal over a deal the council made with Noel Edmonds in the mid-1990s about a theme park in Morecambe. Another councillor, Shirley Reid, was expelled from the group in December 2003 for not attending meetings.

=== Morecambe Town Council (2005–present) ===
The MBIs won 12 of the 60 seats on Lancaster City Council in the 2007 election (behind Labour on 14 and equal to the Greens and Conservatives), but Heath failed in her bid to be re-elected. They won twenty-five of the twenty-six councillors on Morecambe Town Council in 2009 with 64% of the vote, despite facing opposition from a new group of independents called Residents First. Evelyn Archer stood down as leader of the MBI group in January 2010, being replaced by David Kerr. Archer was first elected in 1991, lost her seat in 1995, then was re-elected in 2003. In 2014, Kerr was replaced as leader by the group administrator Geoff Knight.

== Electoral performance ==
=== Lancaster City Council ===
Election	Votes	%	Seats	+/–	Position	Council control
2003	4,303	11.88%	11 / 60	▲11	▲2nd	No Overall Control
2007	10,521	12.79%	11 / 60	0	▼4th	No Overall Control
2011	11,927	13.68%	8 / 60	▼3	4th	No Overall Control
2015		7%	2 / 60	▼6	4th	No Overall Control
2019	10,580	12.9%	14 / 60	▲12	▲2nd	No Overall Control
2023	6,116	8%	3 / 61	▼11	▼5th	No Overall Control

=== Morecambe Town Council ===
Election	Votes	%	Seats	+/–	Position	Council control
2009			25 / 26		1st	MBI
2011			13 / 23	▼12	1st	MBI
2015			6 / 23	▼7	▼2nd	Labour
2019			21 / 26	▲15	▲1st	MBI
2023			14 / 26	▼7	1st	MBI

== See also ==
- Lancaster local elections
